= List of the Cenozoic life of Wyoming =

This list of the Cenozoic life of Wyoming contains the various prehistoric life-forms whose fossilized remains have been reported from within the US state of Wyoming and are between 66 million and 10,000 years of age.

== A ==
- †Aaptoryctes
  - †Aaptoryctes ivyi
- †Absarokius
  - †Absarokius abbotti
  - †Absarokius gazini – type locality for species
  - †Absarokius metoecus – type locality for species
- †Abuta – or unidentified related form
- †Acacia
  - †Acacia lamarensis
  - †Acacia macrosperma
  - †Acacia wardii
- †Acarictis
  - †Acarictis ryani – type locality for species
- Accipiter
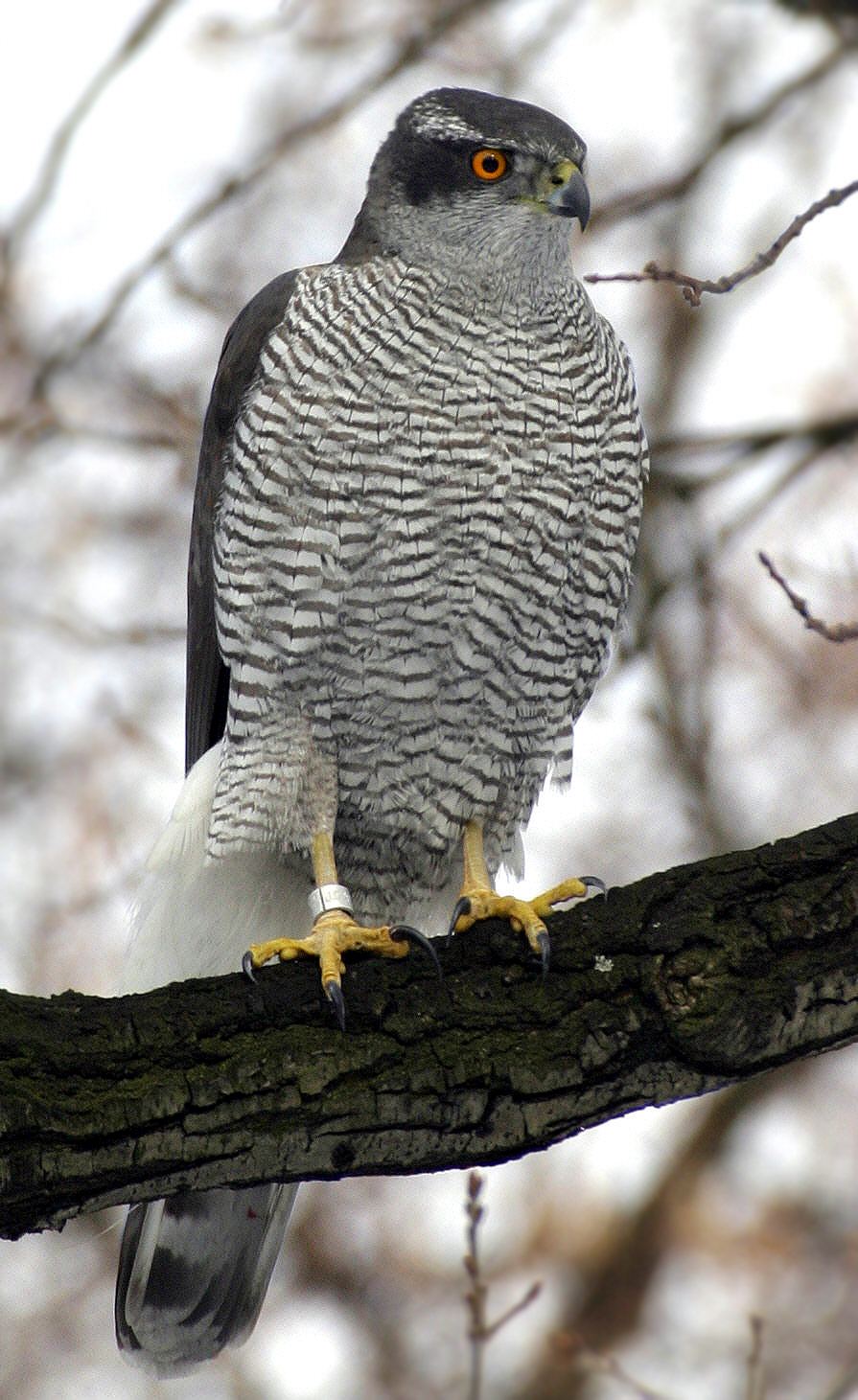
  - A living Accipiter gentilis, or northern goshawk
    Accipiter gentilis
  - †Accipiter striatus
- Acer
  - †Acer lesquereuxi
  - †Acer newberryi
  - †Acer silberlingii
  - †Acer vivarium
- †Aceroryctes – type locality for genus
  - †Aceroryctes dulcis – type locality for species
- †Achaenodon
  - †Achaenodon insolens – type locality for species
  - †Achaenodon robustus – type locality for species
- †Acidomomys – type locality for genus
  - †Acidomomys hebeticus – type locality for species
- †Acmeodon
  - †Acmeodon secans
- †Acocephalus
  - †Acocephalus adae – type locality for species
- †Acritoparamys
  - †Acritoparamys atavus
  - †Acritoparamys atwateri
  - †Acritoparamys francesi
  - †Acritoparamys wyomingensis
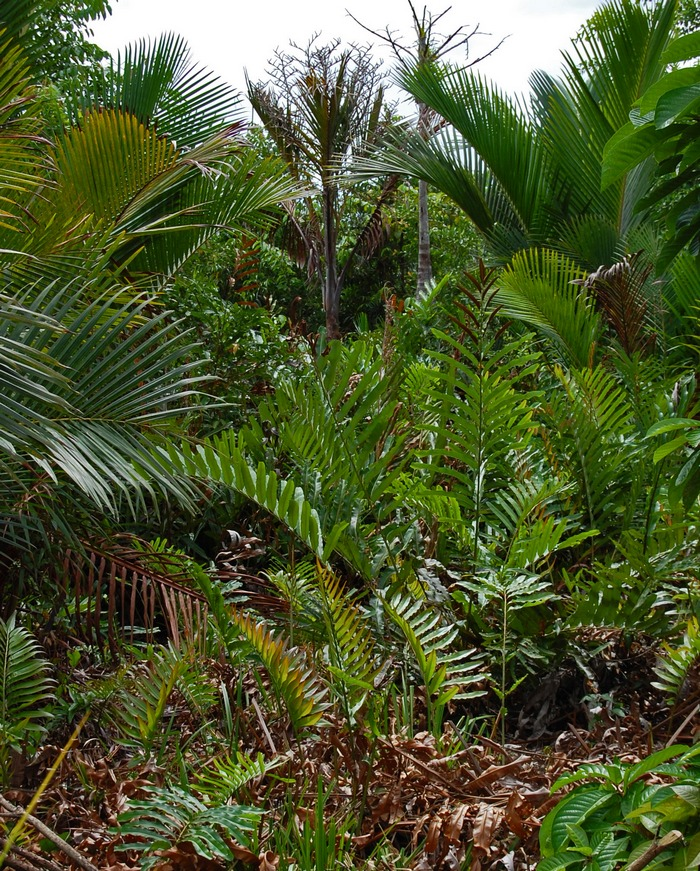
- Living Acrostichum, or leather ferns
  Acrostichum
  - †Acrostichum hesperium
- †Adilophontes – type locality for genus
  - †Adilophontes brachykolos – type locality for species
- †Adjidaumo
  - †Adjidaumo burkei – tentative report
  - †Adjidaumo craigi – or unidentified comparable form
  - †Adjidaumo minimus
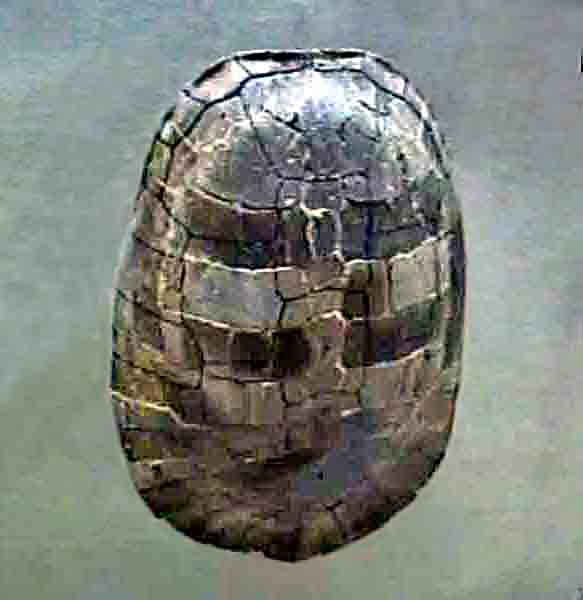
- Fossilized shell of the Early Cretaceous-Oligocene turtle Adocus
  †Adocus
- †Adunator
  - †Adunator fredericki
  - †Adunator ladae
  - †Adunator martinezi
- Aegialia
  - †Aegialia rupta – type locality for species
- Aegolius
  - †Aegolius acadicus
  - Aegolius funereus
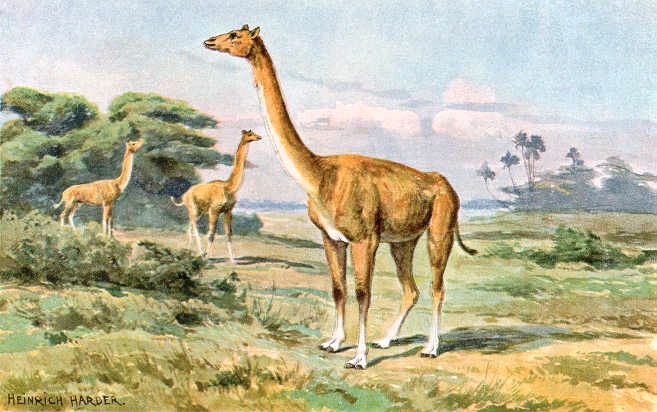
- Life restoration of the Miocene camel Aepycamelus, or the long-necked camel. Heinrich Harder (1920).
  †Aepycamelus
- †Aerugoamnis – type locality for genus
  - †Aerugoamnis paulus – type locality for species
- †Aesculus
  - †Aesculus antiquorum
  - †Aesculus hickeyi
- †Afairiguana – type locality for genus
  - †Afairiguana avius – type locality for species
- †Ageina
  - †Ageina tobieni
- †Ageitodendron
  - †Ageitodendron matthewi
- Agelaius
  - †Agelaius phoeniceus
- †Agnotocastor
  - †Agnotocastor galushai – type locality for species
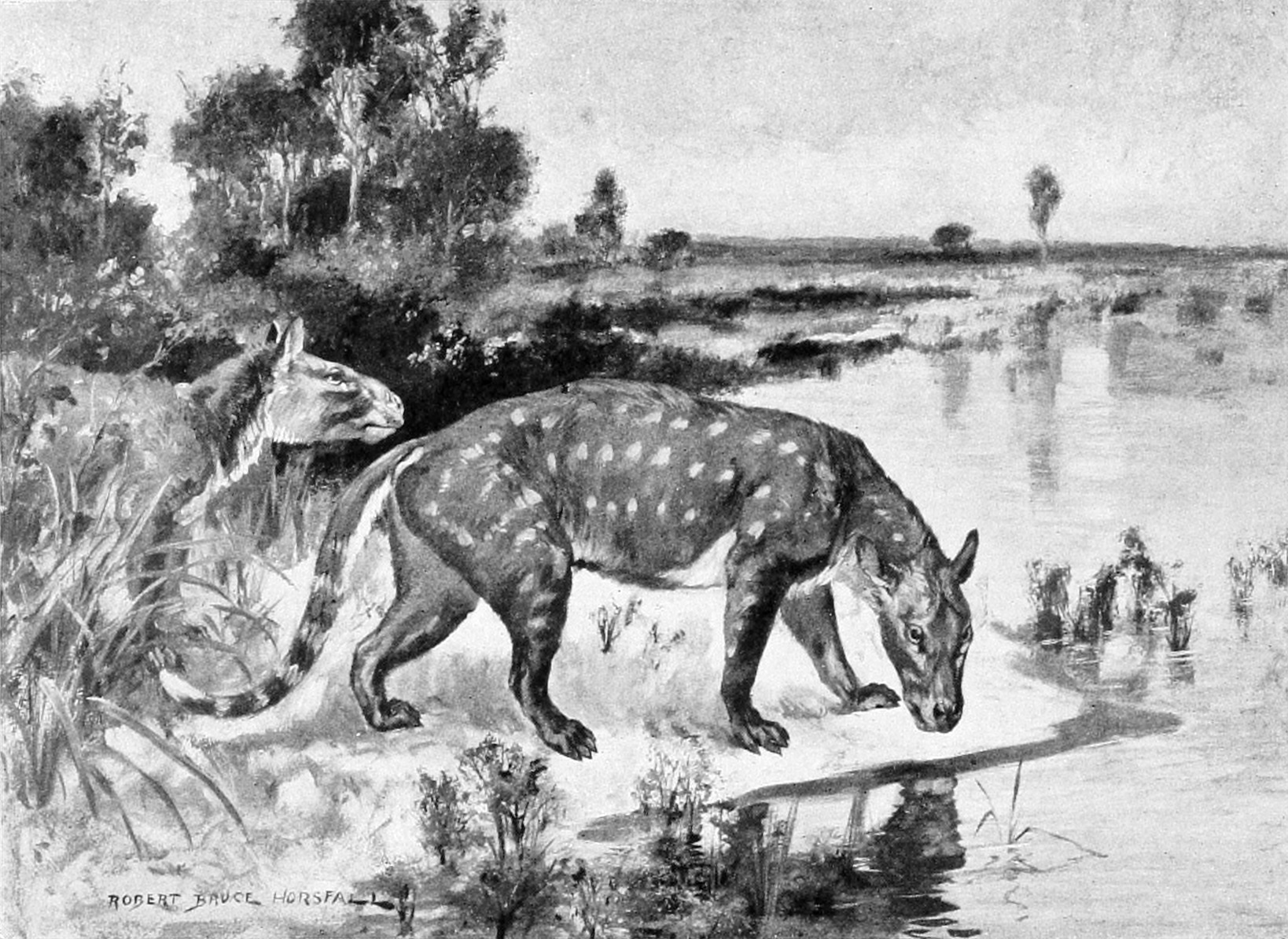
- Life restoration of the Eocene-Oligocene even-toed ungulate Agriochoerus
  †Agriochoerus
  - †Agriochoerus maximus
  - †Agriochoerus minimus – or unidentified comparable form
- Ailanthus
  - †Ailanthus lesquereuxi
- †Alagomys
  - †Alagomys russelli – type locality for species
- †Alastor
  - †Alastor solidescens – type locality for species
- †Albertanella – or unidentified comparable form
  - †Albertanella minuta
- Alces
  - †Alces alces
- †Aletodon
  - †Aletodon conardae – type locality for species
  - †Aletodon gunnelli – type locality for species
  - †Aletodon quadravus
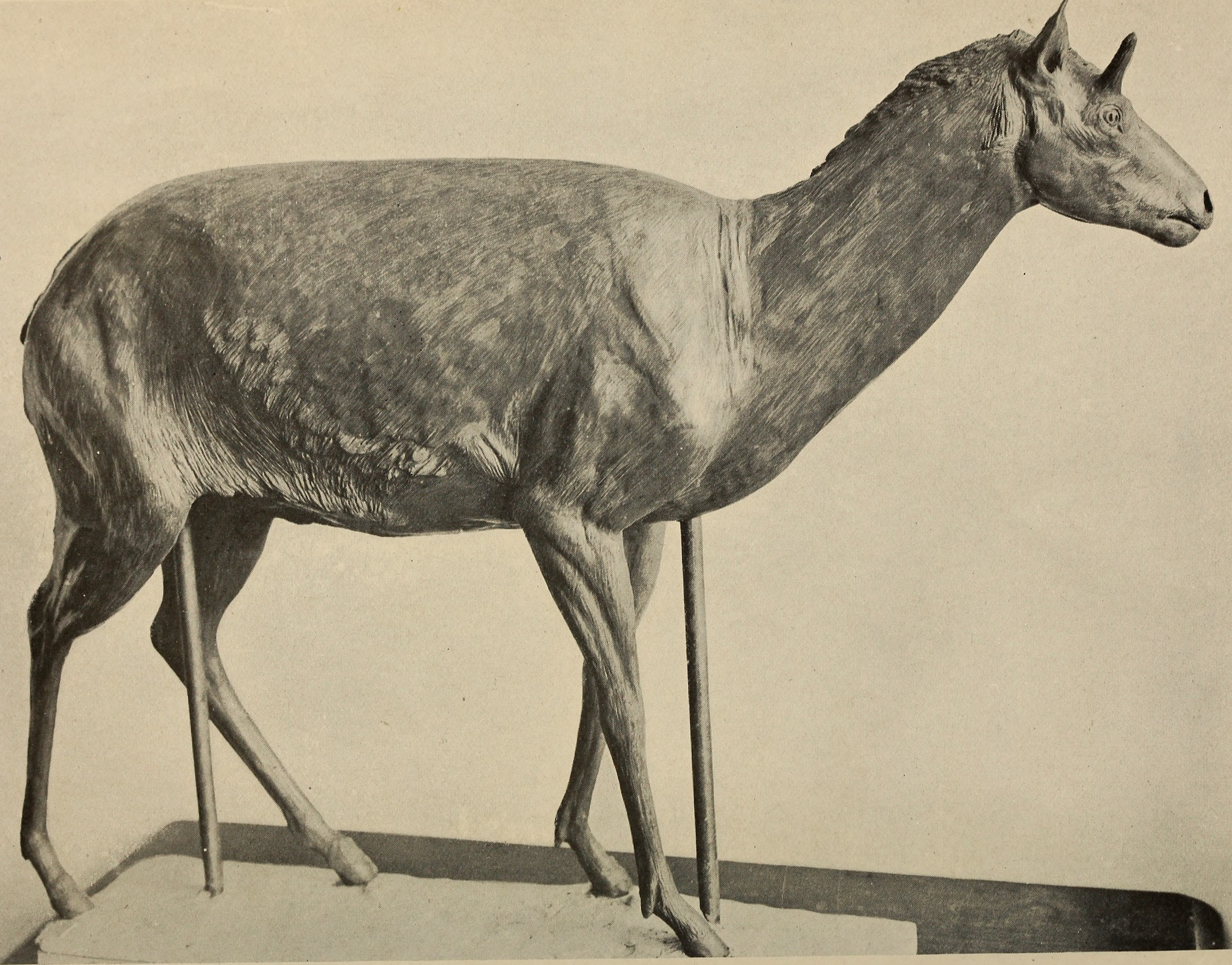
- Restoration of the Miocene deer relative Aletomeryx
  †Aletomeryx
  - †Aletomeryx gracilis
- †Aletornis – type locality for genus
  - †Aletornis bellus – type locality for species
  - †Aletornis gracilis – type locality for species
  - †Aletornis nobilis – type locality for species
  - †Aletornis pernix – type locality for species
  - †Aletornis venustus – type locality for species
- Aleurites
  - †Aleurites glandulosa
- †Alismaphyllites
  - †Alismaphyllites grandifolius
- †Allantodiopsis
  - †Allantoidiopsis erosa
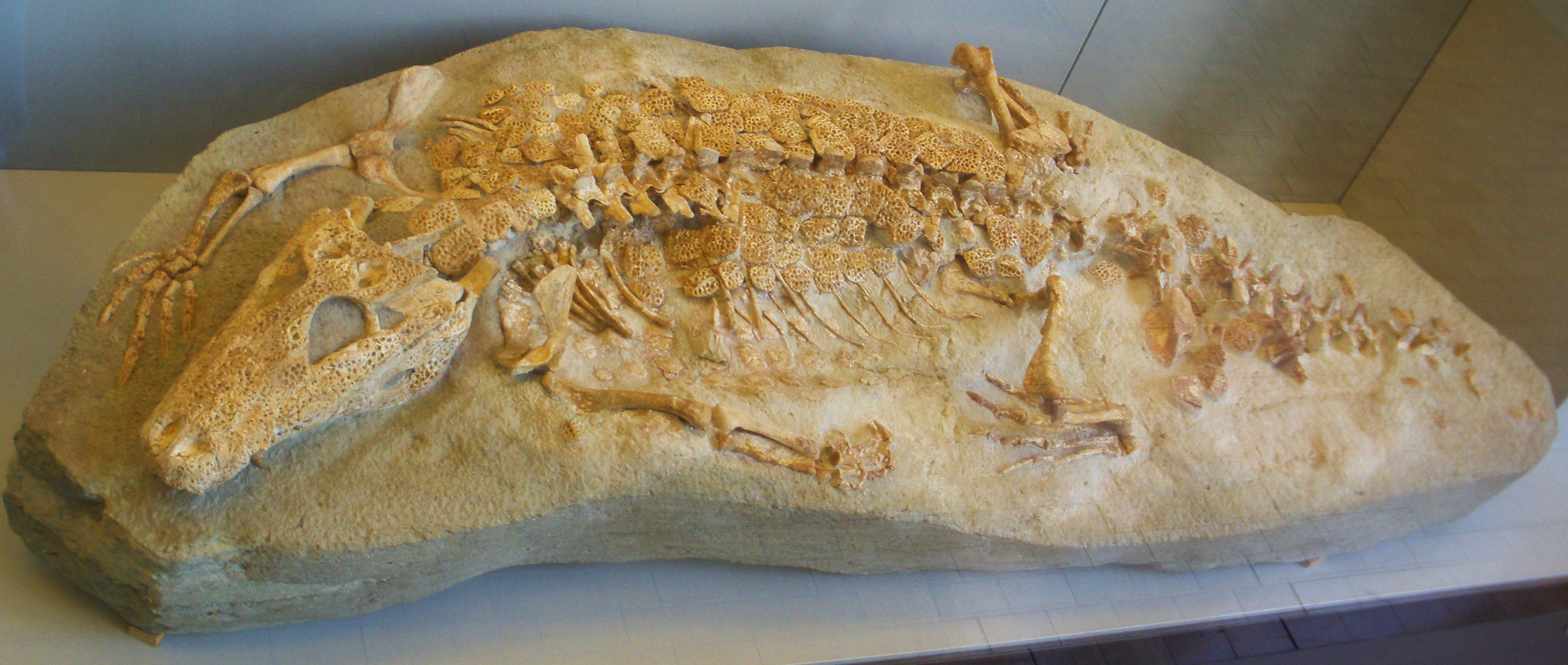
- Fossilized skeleton of the Late Cretaceous-Oligocene Alligator relative Allognathosuchus
  †Allognathosuchus
  - †Allognathosuchus heterodon
  - †Allognathosuchus polyodon
  - †Allognathosuchus wartheni – type locality for species
- †Allomys
  - †Allomys cristabrevis
- †Allophylus
  - †Allophylus flexifolia
- Alnus
- †Alphagaulus
  - †Alphagaulus vetus
- †Alticonus
  - †Alticonus gazini
- †Alveojunctus
  - †Alveojunctus minutus
- †Alveugena
  - †Alveugena carbonensis – type locality for species
- †Amaramnis
  - †Amaramnis gregoryi – type locality for species
- †Ambloctonus
  - †Ambloctonus major
  - †Ambloctonus priscus – or unidentified comparable form
  - †Ambloctonus sinosus
- †Ameiseophis
  - †Ameiseophis robinsoni – type locality for species
- †Amelotabes – type locality for genus
  - †Amelotabes simpsoni – type locality for species
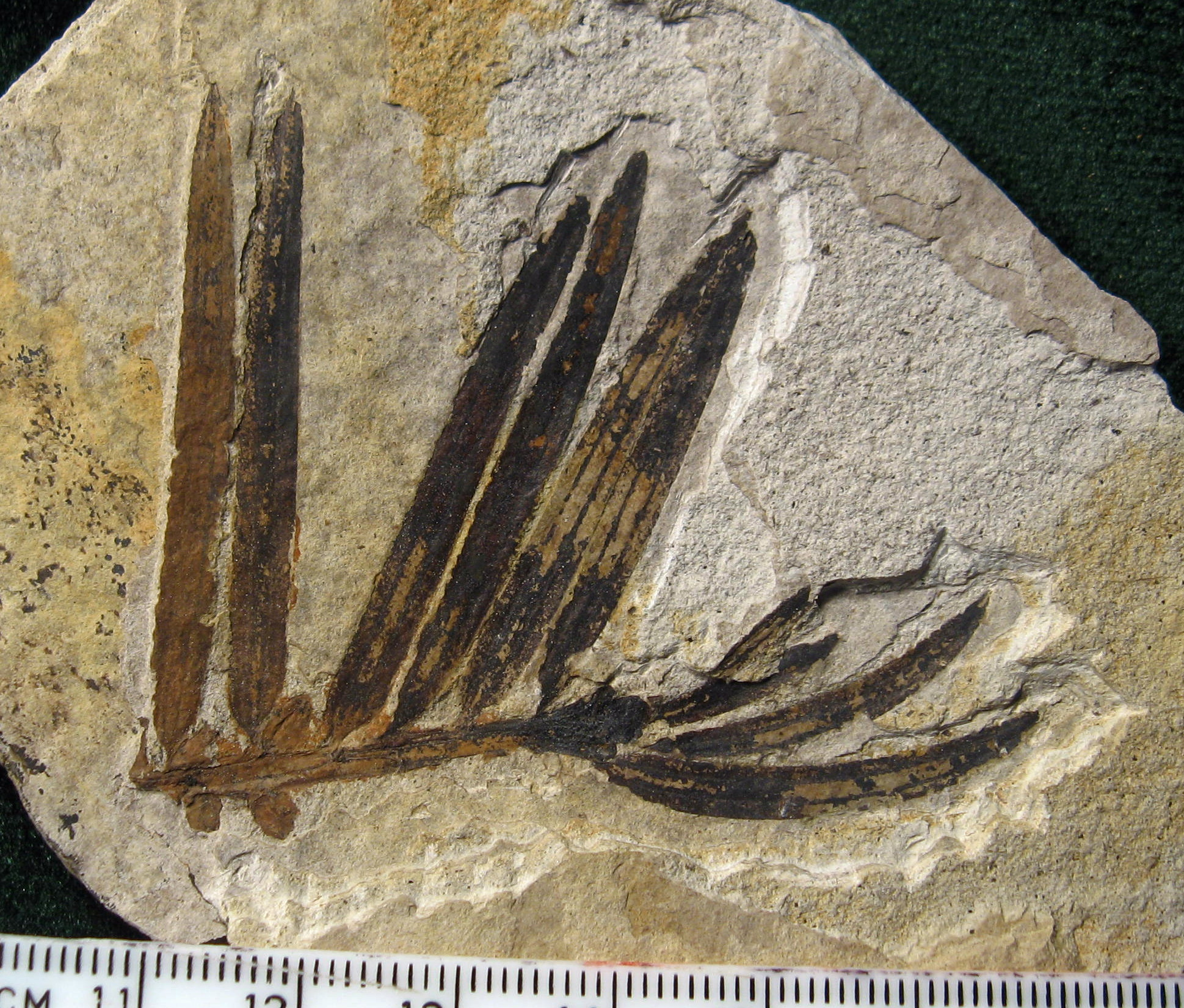
- Fossilized needles of an Amentotaxus, or catkin-yew
  Amentotaxus
  - †Amentotaxus campbelli
- Amia
  - †Amia fragosa
- †Amitabha – type locality for genus
  - †Amitabha urbsinterdictensis – type locality for species
- †Ampelopsis
  - †Ampelopsis acerifolia
- †Amphechinus
  - †Amphechinus ellicottae – type locality for species
- †Amphigyion
  - †Amphigyion straitae
- †Amphilemur
- †Amphiplaga
- Amphiuma
  - †Amphiuma jepseni – type locality for species
- †Ampliconus
  - †Ampliconus antoni – type locality for species
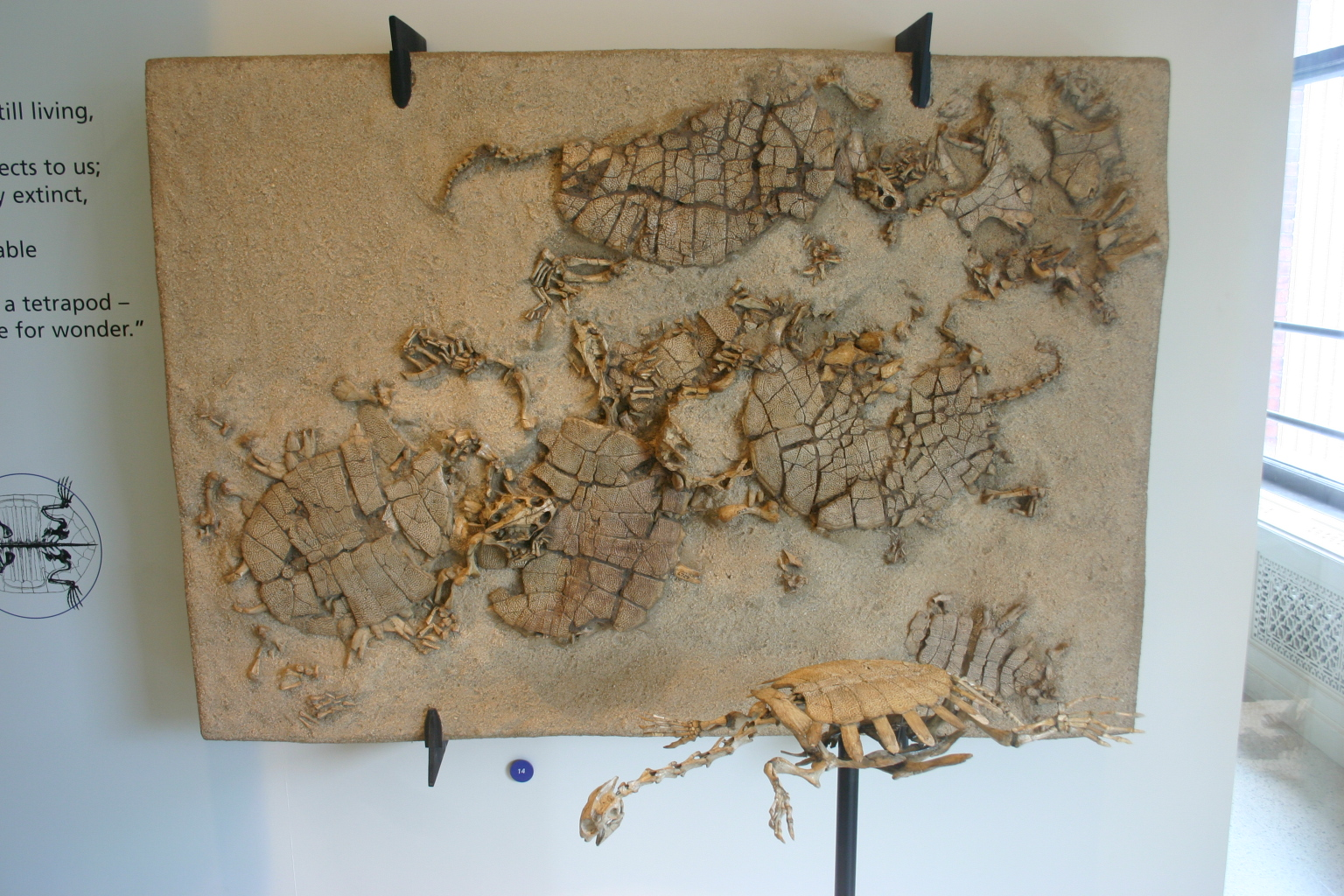
- Assemblage of fossilized skeletons of the softshell turtle Amyda
  Amyda
  - †Amyda egregia – type locality for species
  - †Amyda exquisita – type locality for species
  - †Amyda mira – type locality for species
- †Amynodon
  - †Amynodon advenus
- †Anacardites
  - †Anacardites schinoloxus
- Anaclinia – tentative report
- †Anacodon
  - †Anacodon nexus – type locality for species
  - †Anacodon ursidens
- Anamirta – or unidentified comparable form
  - †Anamirta milleri
- †Anaptomorphus
  - †Anaptomorphus aemulus – type locality for species
  - †Anaptomorphus westi – type locality for species
- Anas
  - †Anas acuta
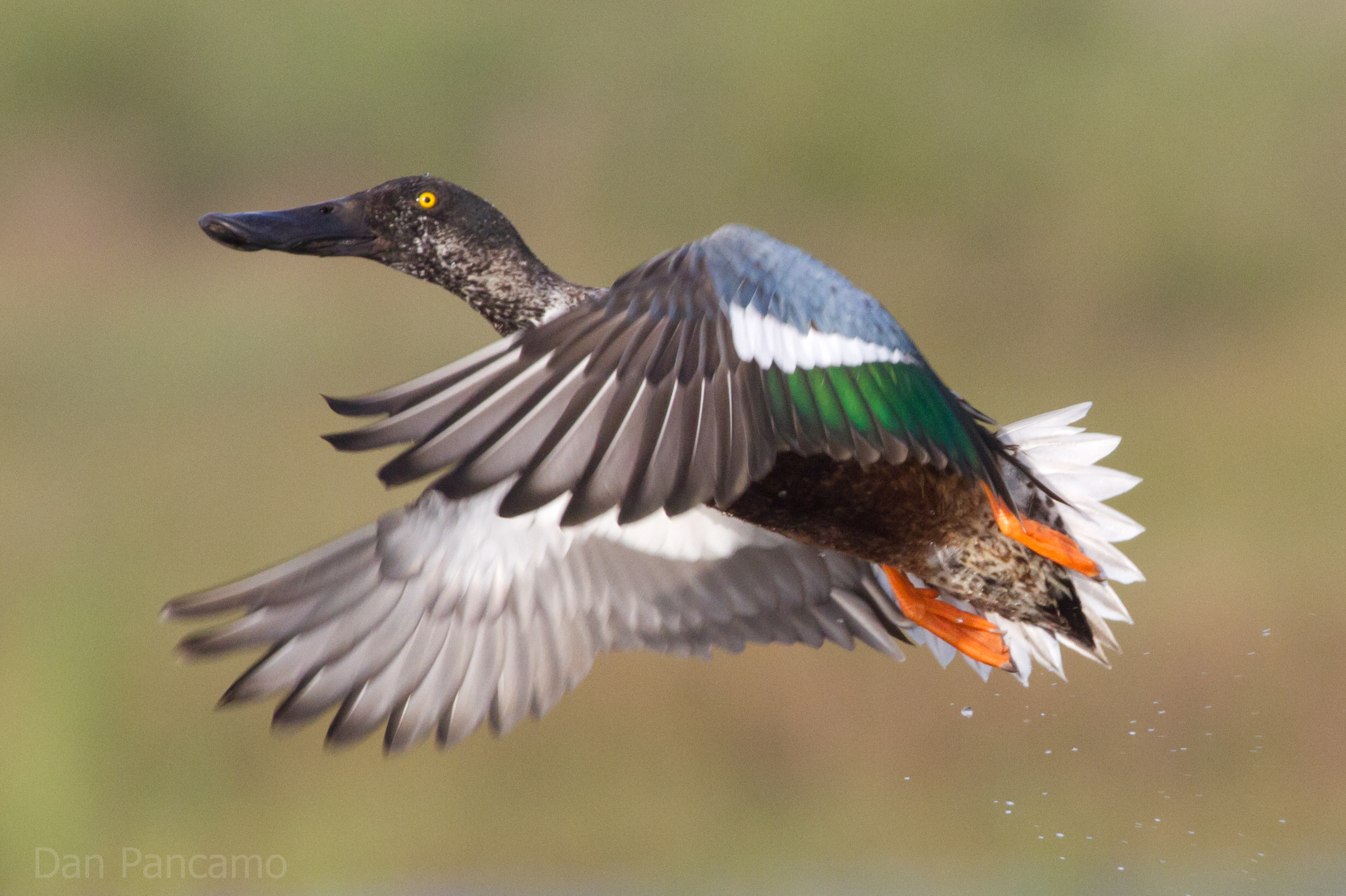
  - A living Spatula clypeata, or northern shoveler
    Anas clypeata
  - †Anas crecca
  - Anas platyrhynchos
  - †Anas schneideri – type locality for species
- †Anatella
  - †Anatella tacita – type locality for species
- †Anconodon
  - †Anconodon cochranensis
  - †Anconodon gidleyi
- †Anemia
  - †Anemia elongata
- †Anemorhysis
  - †Anemorhysis natronensis – type locality for species
  - †Anemorhysis pattersoni – type locality for species
  - †Anemorhysis sublettensis – type locality for species
  - †Anemorhysis wortmani – type locality for species
- †Anilioides
  - †Anilioides nebraskensis
- †Anisonchus
  - †Anisonchus sectorius
  - †Anisonchus willeyi – type locality for species
- †Ankylodon
  - †Ankylodon annectens – or unidentified comparable form
- †Anniealexandria – type locality for genus
  - †Anniealexandria gansi – type locality for species
- Anobium
  - †Anobium deceptum – type locality for species
  - †Anobium lignitum – type locality for species
  - †Anobium ovale – type locality for species
- †Anolbanolis – type locality for genus
  - †Anolbanolis banalis – type locality for species
  - †Anolbanolis geminus – type locality for species
- †Anomoemys
  - †Anomoemys lewisi
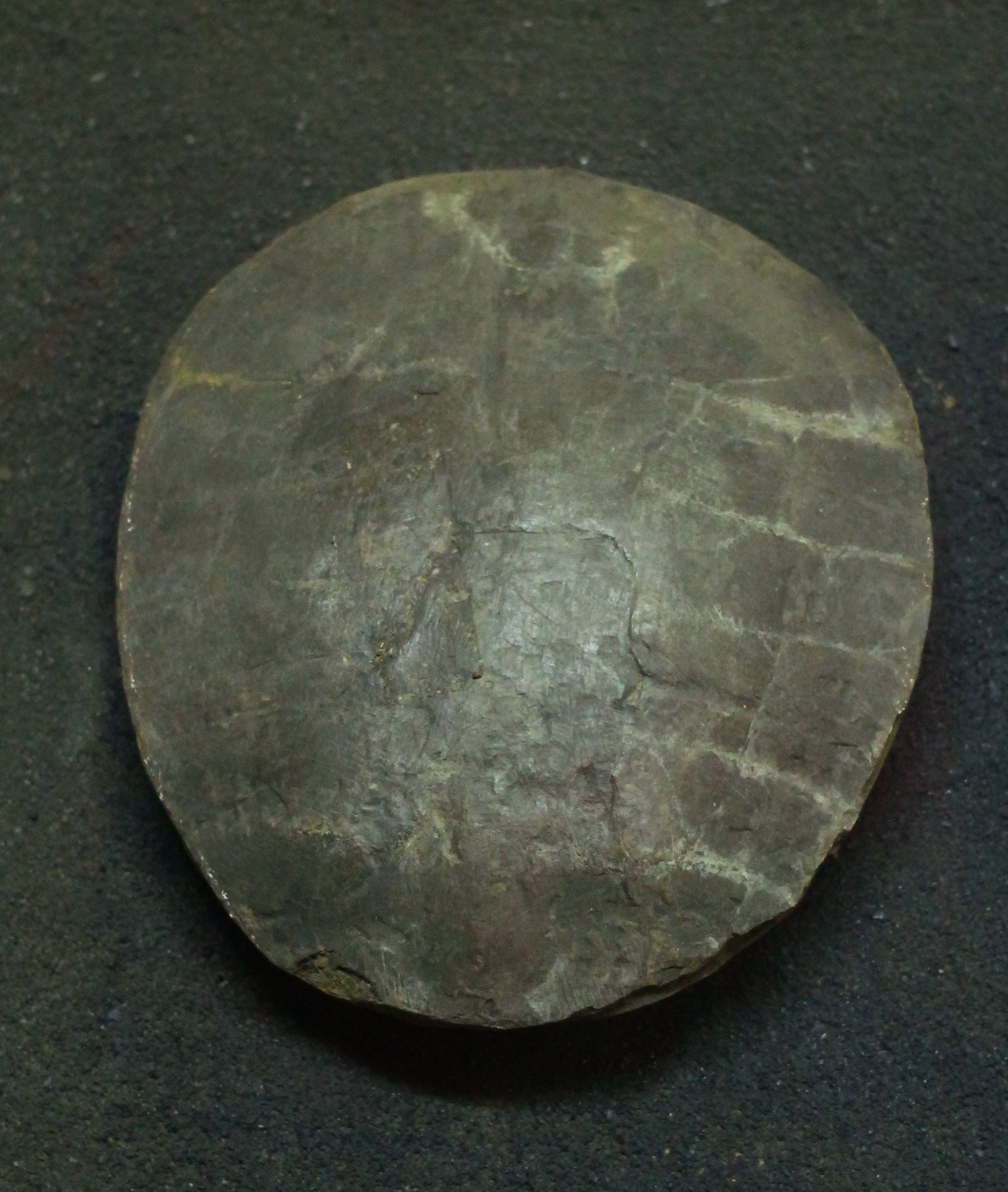
- Fossilized shell of the Eocene-Oligocene turtle Anosteira
  †Anosteira
  - †Anosteira ornata
  - †Anosteira radulina – type locality for species
  - †Anosteira trionychoides
- †Antherophagus
  - †Antherophagus priscus – type locality for species
- Anthonomus
  - †Anthonomus revictus – type locality for species
  - †Anthonomus soporus – type locality for species
- †Antiacodon
  - †Antiacodon pygmaeus – type locality for species
  - †Antiacodon vanvaleni – type locality for species
  - †Antiacodon venustus – type locality for species
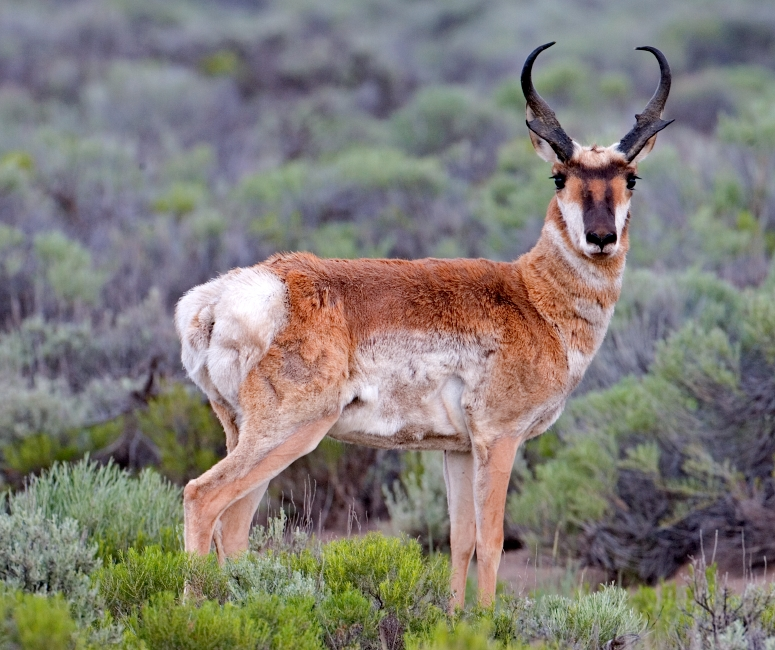
- A living Antilocapra, or pronghorn
  Antilocapra
  - †Antilocapra americana
- Apalone
  - †Apalone extensa – type locality for species
  - †Apalone heteroglypta – type locality for species
  - †Apalone postera – type locality for species
- †Apatemys
  - †Apatemys bellulus – type locality for species
  - †Apatemys bellus
  - †Apatemys chardini – or unidentified comparable form
  - †Apatemys hendryi – type locality for species
  - †Apatemys rodens
- †Aphaena
  - †Aphaena rotundipennis – type locality for species
- †Apheliscus – type locality for genus
  - †Apheliscus chydaeus – type locality for species
  - †Apheliscus insidiosus
  - †Apheliscus nitidus
  - †Apheliscus wapitiensis – type locality for species
- †Aphelops
  - †Aphelops megalodus
- †Aphronorus
  - †Aphronorus fraudator
  - †Aphronorus orieli – type locality for species
  - †Aphronorus ratatoski – type locality for species
- †Apodosauriscus – type locality for genus
  - †Apodosauriscus minutus – type locality for species
  - †Apodosauriscus thermophilus – type locality for species
- †Apriculus
  - †Apriculus praeteritus – type locality for species
- †Apternodus
  - †Apternodus brevirostris – type locality for species
  - †Apternodus dasophylakas – type locality for species
  - †Apternodus gregoryi – type locality for species
  - †Apternodus iliffensis
  - †Apternodus major – type locality for species
- Aquila
  - †Aquila antiqua – type locality for species
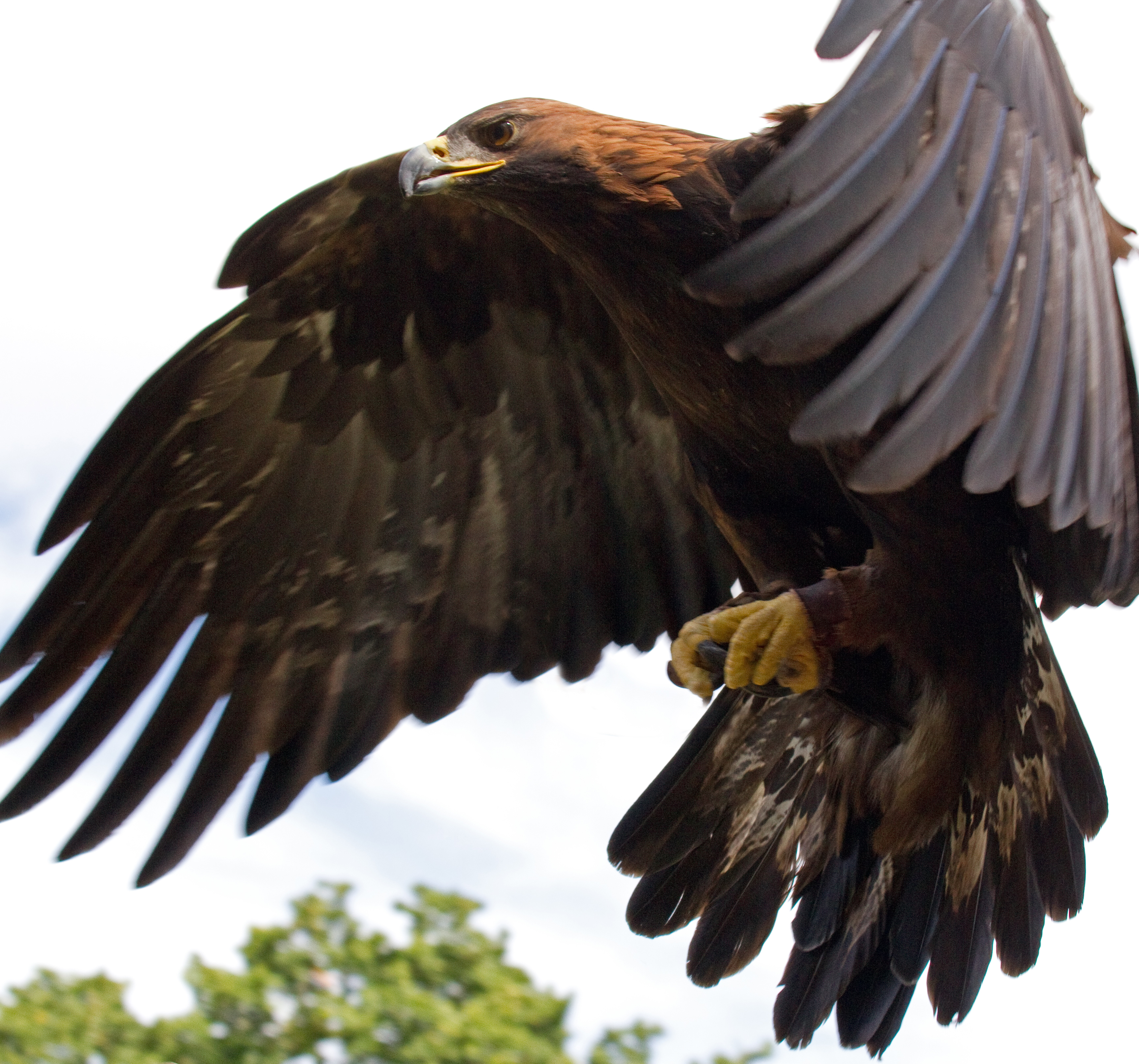
  - A living Aquila chrysaetos, or golden eagle
    Aquila chrysaetos
- Aralia
  - †Aralia notata
  - †Aralia serrulata
  - †Aralia wrightii
- †Araliophyllum
  - †Araliophyllum quina
- Araneus
- †Arapahovius
  - †Arapahovius advena – type locality for species
  - †Arapahovius gazini – type locality for species
- Araucaria
  - †Araucaria longifolia
- †Archaeocyon
  - †Archaeocyon falkenbachi
  - †Archaeocyon leptodus
- †Archaeolagus
  - †Archaeolagus emeraldensis
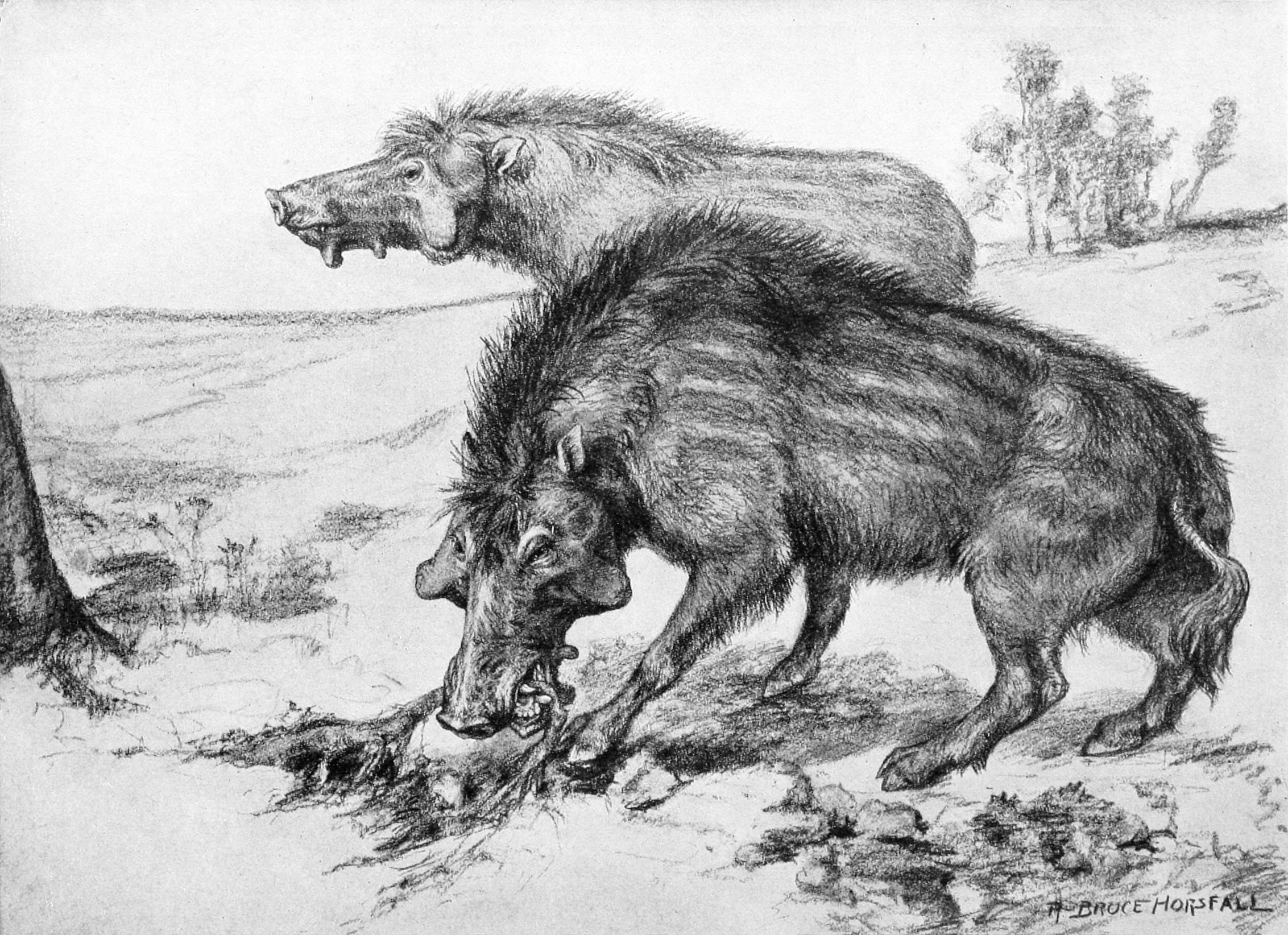
- Life restoration of the Eocene-Oligocene entelodont mammal Archaeotherium
  †Archaeotherium
  - †Archaeotherium minimus
  - †Archaeotherium mortoni
  - †Archaeotherium palustris – type locality for species
- †Archaerhineura – type locality for genus
  - †Archaerhineura mephitis – type locality for species
- Arcoa
  - †Arcoa lindgreni – type locality for species
- †Arctocyon
  - †Arctocyon ferox
  - †Arctocyon mumak
- †Arctodontomys
  - †Arctodontomys nuptus
  - †Arctodontomys simplicidens
  - †Arctodontomys wilsoni – type locality for species
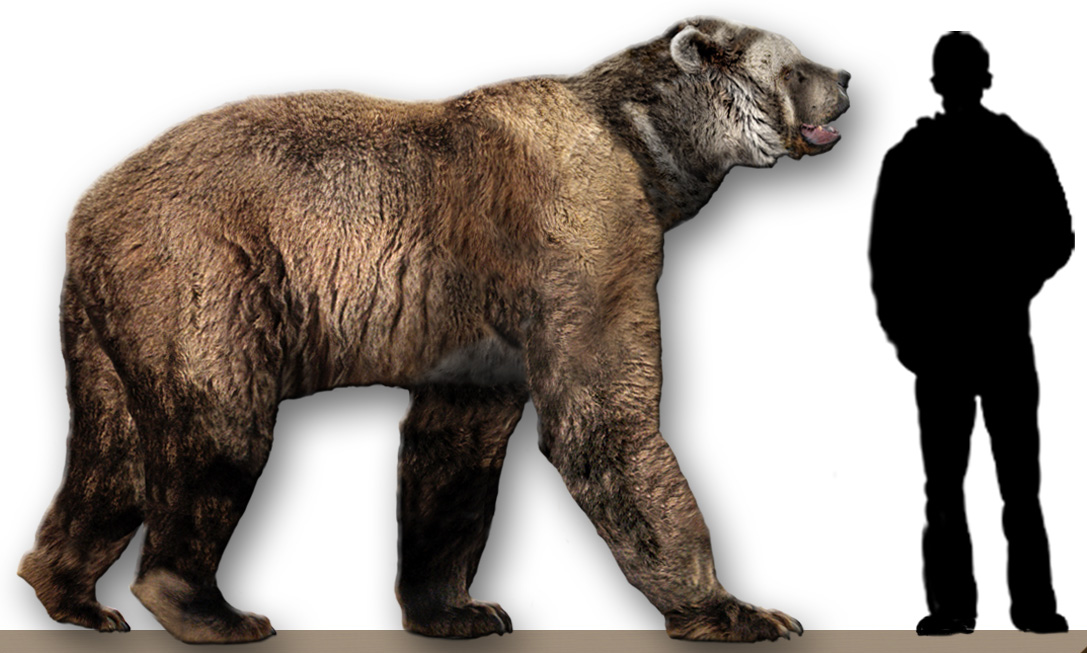
- Restoration of an Arctodus, or short-faced bear, with a human to scale
  †Arctodus
  - †Arctodus simus
- †Arctostaphylos
  - †Arctostaphylos elliptica
- †Arctostylops
  - †Arctostylops steini
- †Arecipites
  - †Arecipites tenuiexinous
- †Arenahippus
  - †Arenahippus aemulor – type locality for species
  - †Arenahippus pernix – type locality for species
- †Arfia
  - †Arfia junnei
  - †Arfia opisthotoma
  - †Arfia shoshoniensis
  - †Arfia zele – type locality for species
- Aristolochia
  - †Aristolochia mortua
- †Armintodelphys
  - †Armintodelphys blacki
  - †Armintodelphys dawsoni
- †Armintomys
  - †Armintomys tullbergi
- †Arpadosaurus – type locality for genus
  - †Arpadosaurus gazinorum – type locality for species
  - †Arpadosaurus sepulchralis – type locality for species
- †Artimonius
  - †Artimonius nocerai
  - †Artimonius witteri
- Artocarpus – tentative report
  - †Artocarpus quercoides
- †Asarkina
  - †Asarkina quadrata – type locality for species
- †Asiabradypus – or unidentified comparable form
- Asio
  - †Asio flammeus
  - Asio otus
- †Asplenium
  - †Asplenium delicatula
  - †Asplenium eoligniticum
  - †Asplenium eolignitum
  - †Asplenium erosum
  - †Asplenium iddingsi
  - †Asplenium remotidens
- †Astephus
- †Asterotrygon
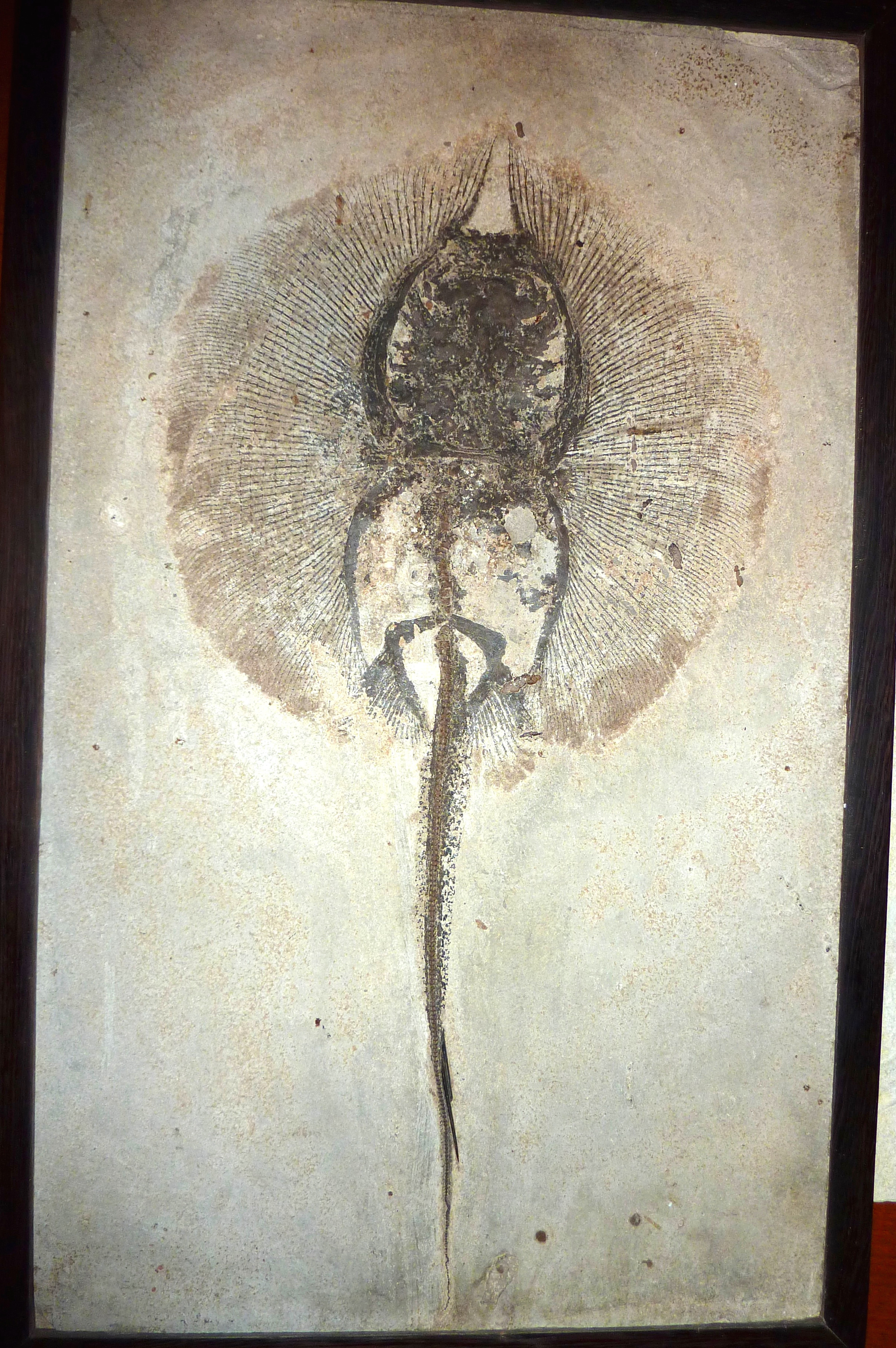
  - An Asterotrygon maloneyi stingray
    †Asterotrygon maloneyi
- Astronium
  - †Astronium truncatum
- †Athyana
  - †Athyana balli
- †Aulolithomys
  - †Aulolithomys bounites
  - †Aulolithomys vexilliames – type locality for species
- †Auroralestes
  - †Auroralestes simpsoni
- †Auxontodon
- †Averrhoites
  - †Averrhoites affinis
- †Avunculus
  - †Avunculus didelphodonti – or unidentified comparable form
- †Axestemys – type locality for genus
  - †Axestemys byssina – type locality for species
  - †Axestemys cerevisia – type locality for species
  - †Axestemys salebrosa – type locality for species
  - †Axestemys uintaensis – type locality for species
- †Aycrossia
  - †Aycrossia lovei
- Aythya
  - Aythya collaris
- Azolla
  - †Azolla cretacea
- †Azygonyx
  - †Azygonyx ancylion – type locality for species
  - †Azygonyx grangeri
  - †Azygonyx xenicus – type locality for species

== B ==
- †Babibasiliscus – type locality for genus
  - †Babibasiliscus alxi – type locality for species
- †Baena
  - †Baena arenosa – type locality for species
- †Bahndwivici – type locality for genus
  - †Bahndwivici ammoskius – type locality for species
- †Baioconodon
  - †Baioconodon denverensis – or unidentified comparable form
  - †Baioconodon middletoni – type locality for species
  - †Baioconodon nordicus
  - †Baioconodon wovokae
- †Baiotomeus
  - †Baiotomeus douglassi
  - †Baiotomeus lamberti
- †Baltemys – type locality for genus
  - †Baltemys staurogastros – type locality for species
- †Baptemys
  - †Baptemys wyomingensis – type locality for species
- †Barbouromeryx – or unidentified comparable form
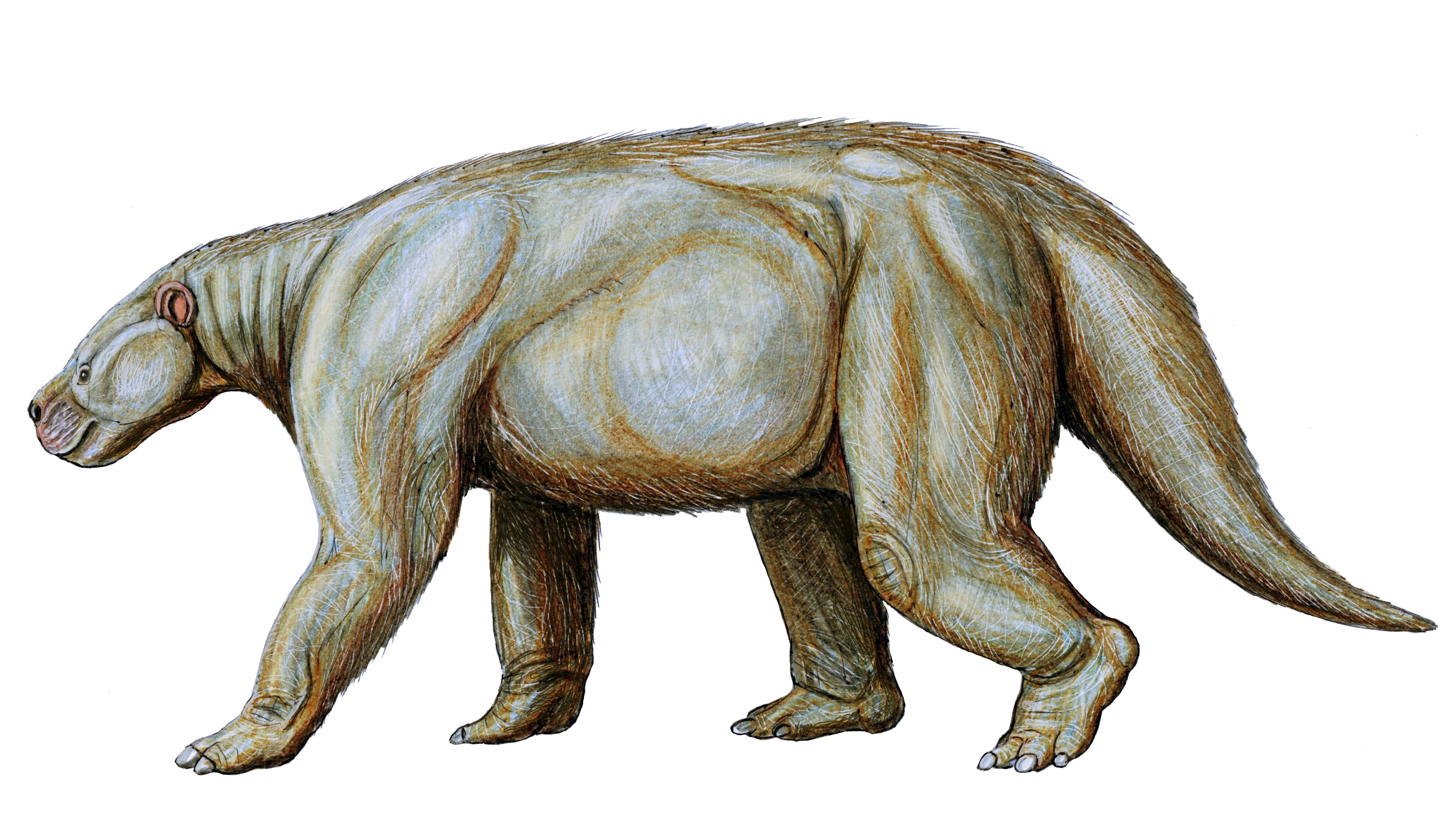
- Life restoration of the Paleocene-Eocene pantodont mammal Barylambda
  †Barylambda
  - †Barylambda churchilli – type locality for species
  - †Barylambda faberi
- †Bathornis
  - †Bathornis fricki – type locality for species
- †Bathygenys
  - †Bathygenys alpha
  - †Bathygenys hedlundae
- †Bathyopsis
  - †Bathyopsis fissidens
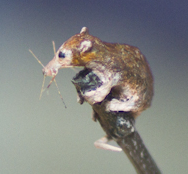
- Restorative model of the Eocene shrew-like mammal Batodonoides
  †Batodonoides
  - †Batodonoides vanhouteni – type locality for species
- †Batrachosauroides – tentative report
- Bauhinia
  - †Bauhinia wyomingana
  - †Bauhinia wyomingiana
- †Beilschmiedia
  - †Beilschmiedia eocenica
- †Berchemiopsis
  - †Berchemiopsis paucidentata
- †Beringiaphyllum
  - †Beringiaphyllum cupanioides
- †Berosus
  - †Berosus sexstriatus – type locality for species
  - †Berosus tenuis – type locality for species
- †Bessoecetor
  - †Bessoecetor septentrionalis
- Betula
  - †Betula iddingsi
  - †Betula stevensoni
  - †Betula stevensonii
- Biomphalaria
- Bison
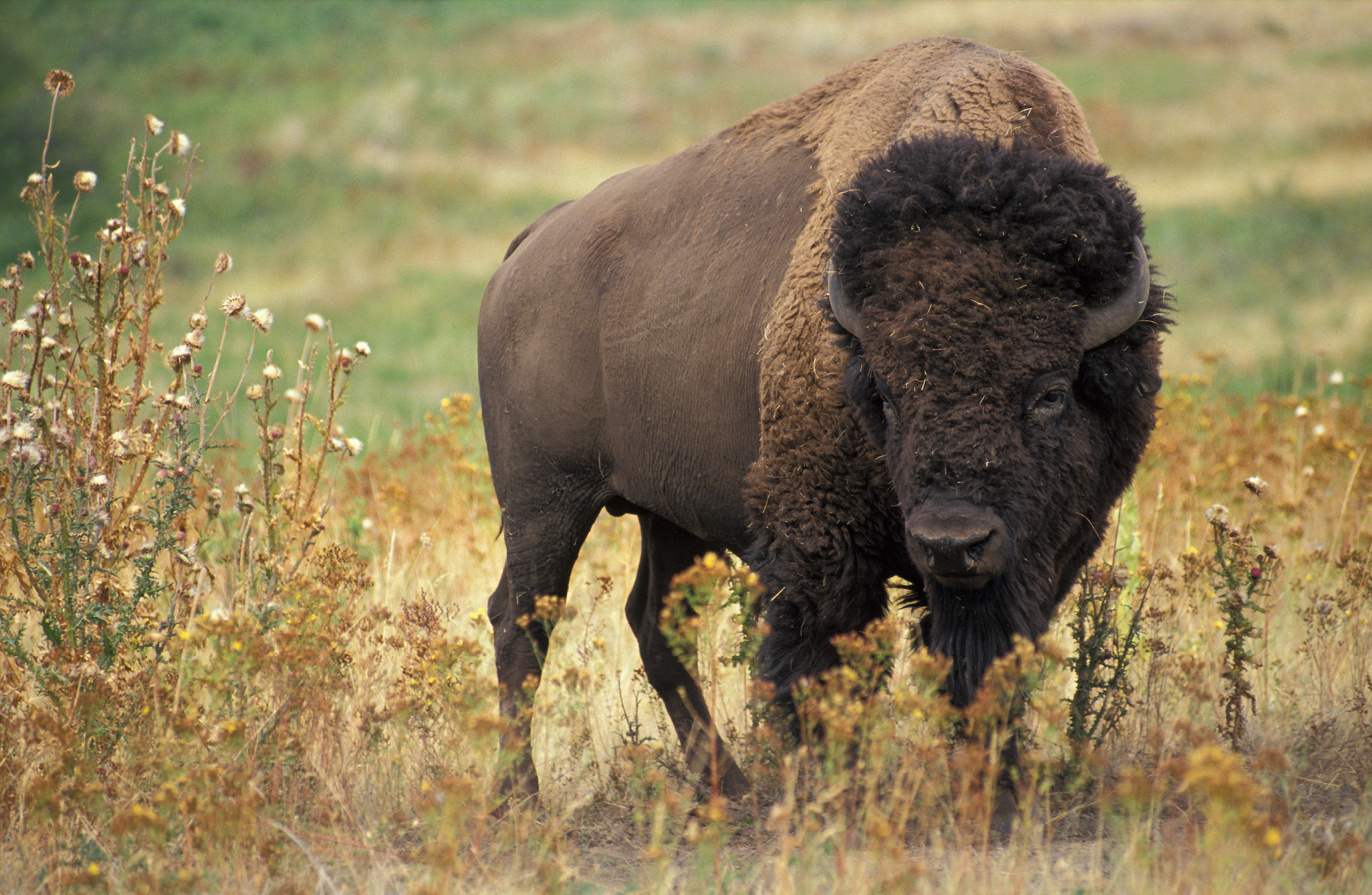
  - A living Bison bison
    †Bison bison
- †Bisonalveus – type locality for genus
  - †Bisonalveus browni – type locality for species
  - †Bisonalveus holtzmani – type locality for species
- †Blechnum
  - †Blechnum anceps
- Bledius
  - †Bledius adamus – type locality for species
  - †Bledius faecorum – type locality for species
- †Blickomylus
  - †Blickomylus galushai
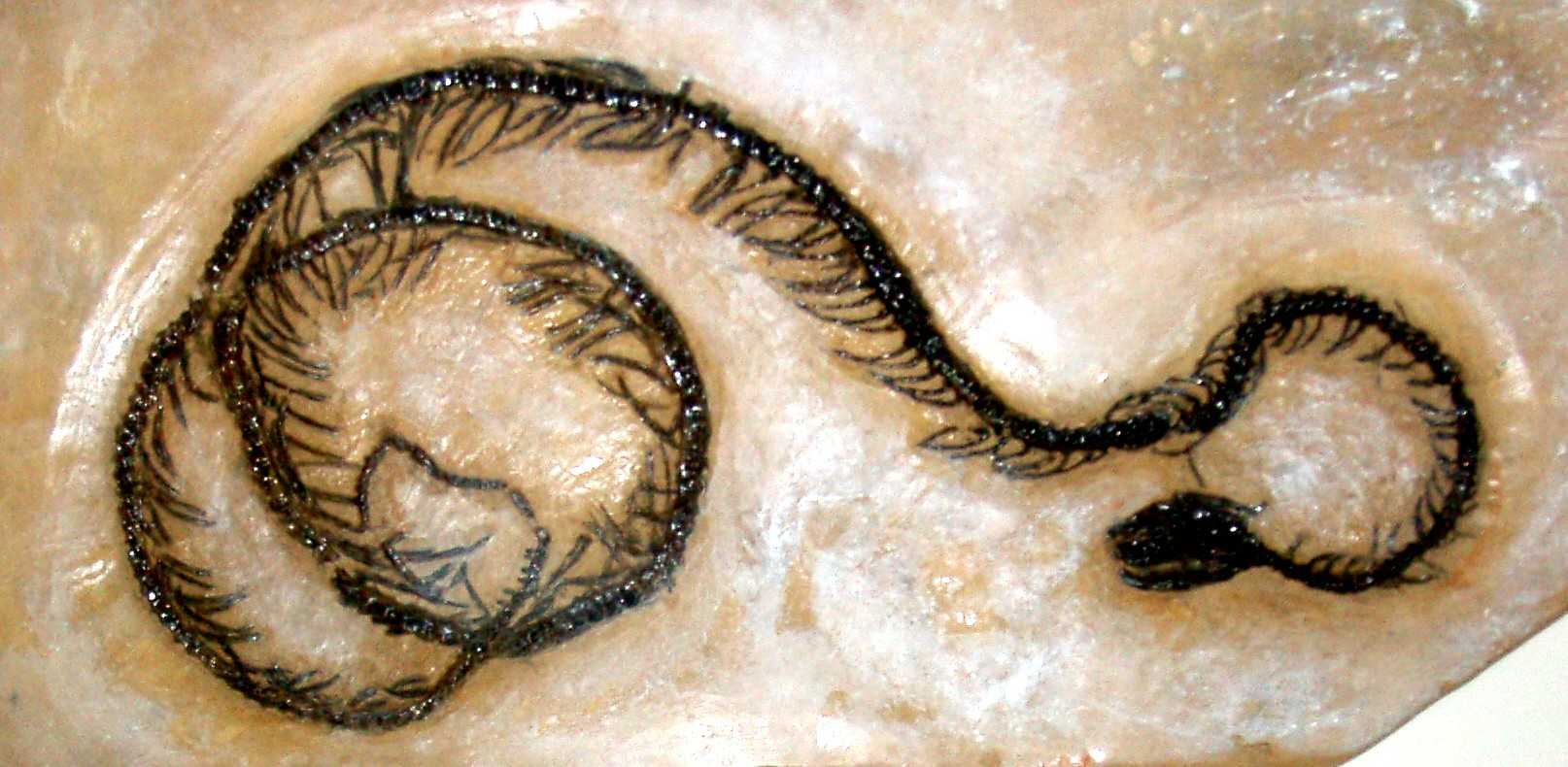
- Fossilized skeleton of the eocene-?Miocene boa snake Boavus
  †Boavus – type locality for genus
  - †Boavus brevis – type locality for species
  - †Boavus idelmani – type locality for species
  - †Boavus occidentalis – type locality for species
- Boletina
  - †Boletina paludivaga – type locality for species
  - †Boletina umbratica – type locality for species
- †Bootherium
  - †Bootherium bombifrons
- †Borealosuchus
  - †Borealosuchus formidabilis
  - †Borealosuchus wilsoni – type locality for species
- †Botauroides – type locality for genus
  - †Botauroides parvus – type locality for species
- †Bouromeryx
- †Boverisuchus
  - †Boverisuchus vorax
- †Bownomomys – type locality for genus
  - †Bownomomys americanus – type locality for species. Formerly known as Teilhardina americana.
  - †Bownomomys crassidens – type locality for species. Formerly known as Teilhardina crassidens.
- †Boysia – or unidentified comparable form
  - †Boysia phenacodorum
- †Brachianodon
  - †Brachianodon westorum – type locality for species
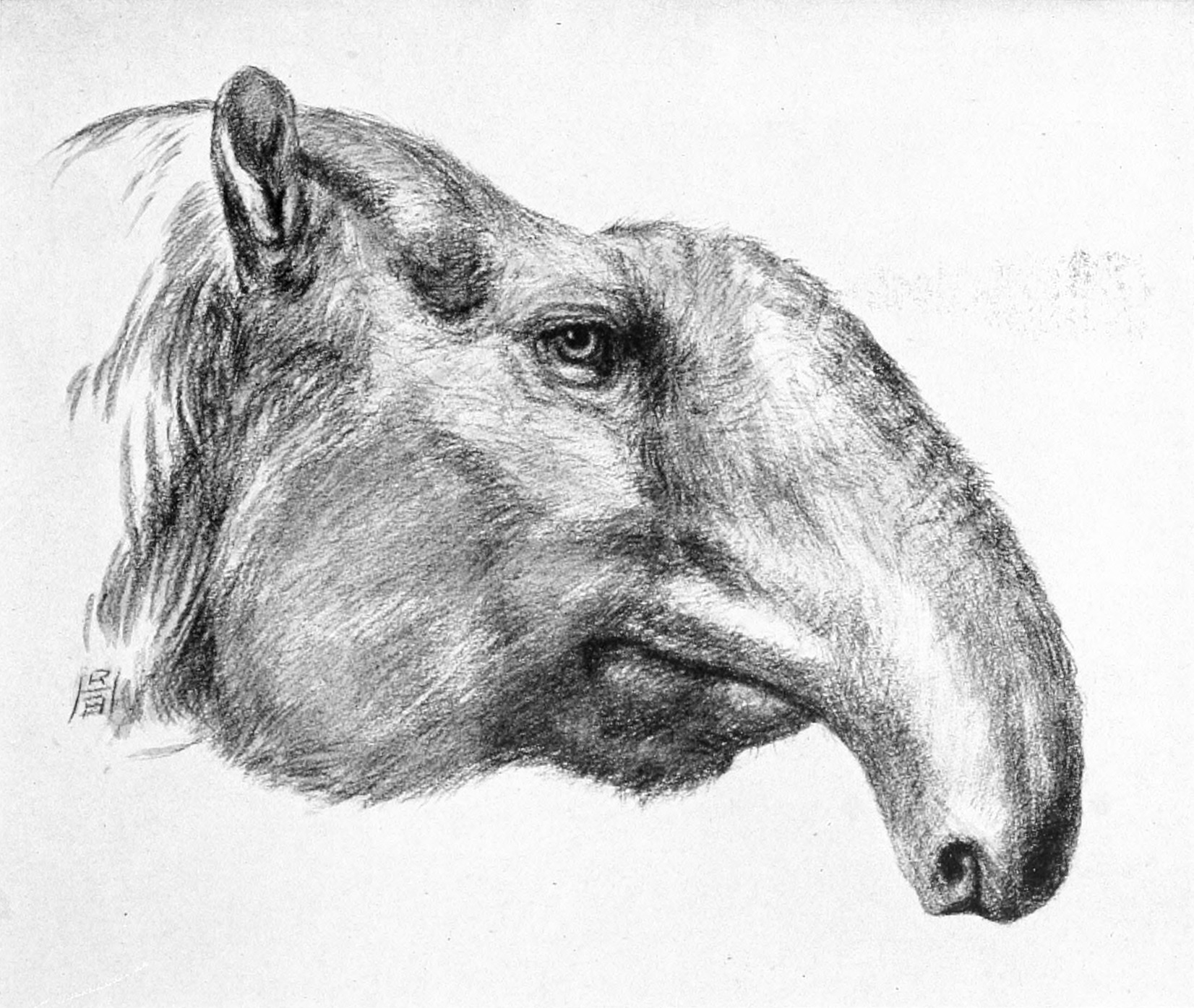
- Restorative portrait of the Miocene oreodont mammal Brachycrus
  †Brachycrus
  - †Brachycrus rusticus
  - †Brachycrus sweetwaterensis
  - †Brachycrus vaughani
- †Brachyerix
  - †Brachyerix macrotis
- †Brachyhyops
  - †Brachyhyops viensis
  - †Brachyhyops wyomingensis – type locality for species
- †Brachyrhynchocyon
  - †Brachyrhynchocyon dodgei
  - †Brachyrhynchocyon intermedius
- †Brachyuranochampsa – type locality for genus
  - †Brachyuranochampsa eversolei – type locality for species
- Bracon
  - †Bracon laminarum – type locality for species
- Branta
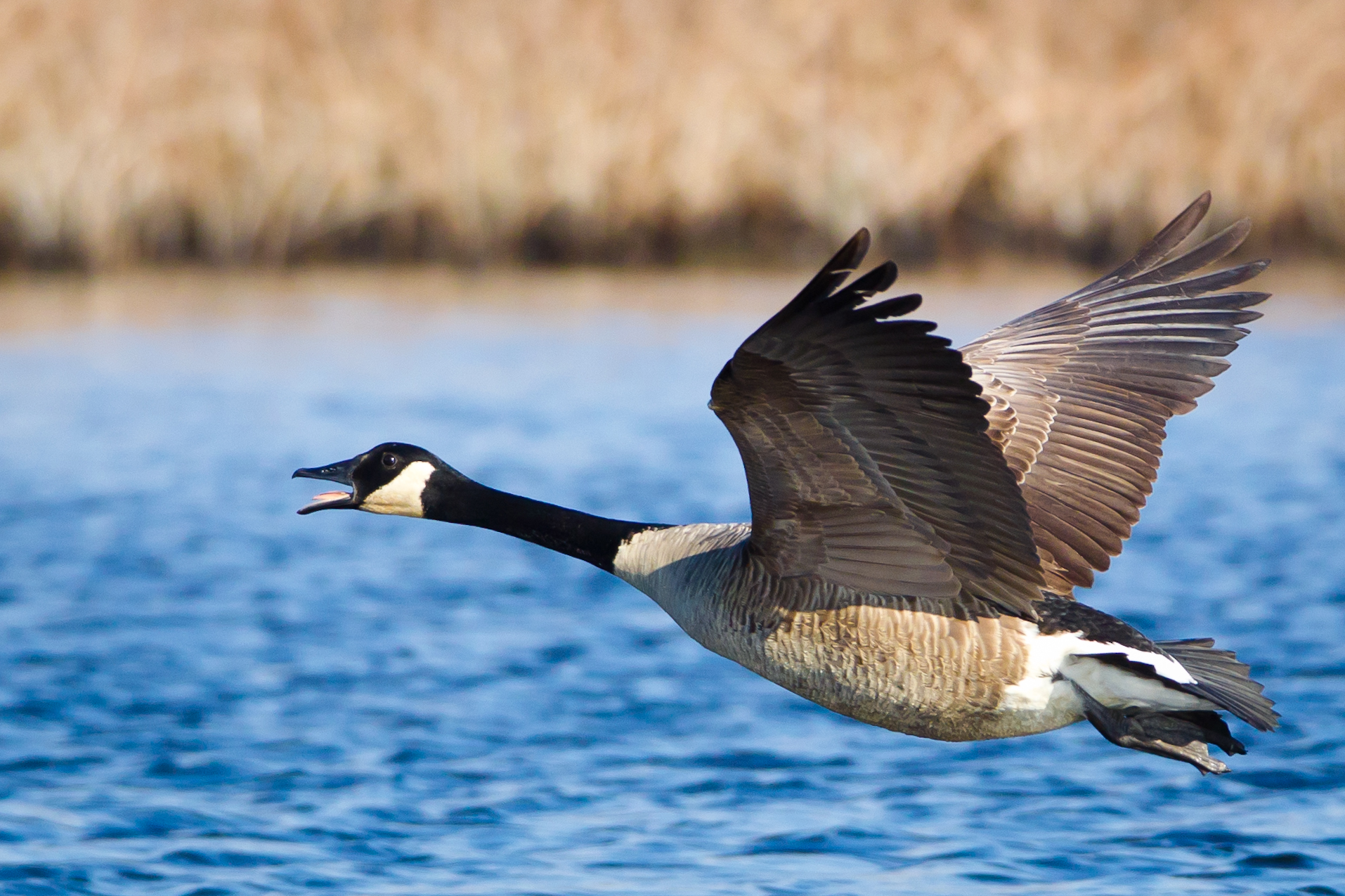
  - A living Branta canadensis, or Canada goose
    †Branta canadensis
- †Bridgeremys
  - †Bridgeremys pusilla – type locality for species
- †Brontops
- †Browniea
  - †Browniea serrata
- †Bryophyte – or unidentified related form
- Bubo
  - †Bubo virginianus
- †Bunophorus
  - †Bunophorus etsagicus
  - †Bunophorus grangeri
  - †Bunophorus macropternus
  - †Bunophorus robustus
  - †Bunophorus sinclairi – type locality for species
- †Bunrsera
  - †Bunrsera inaequalateralis
- Buteo
  - †Buteo jamaicensis
  - †Buteo lagopus
  - †Buteo regalis – or unidentified comparable form
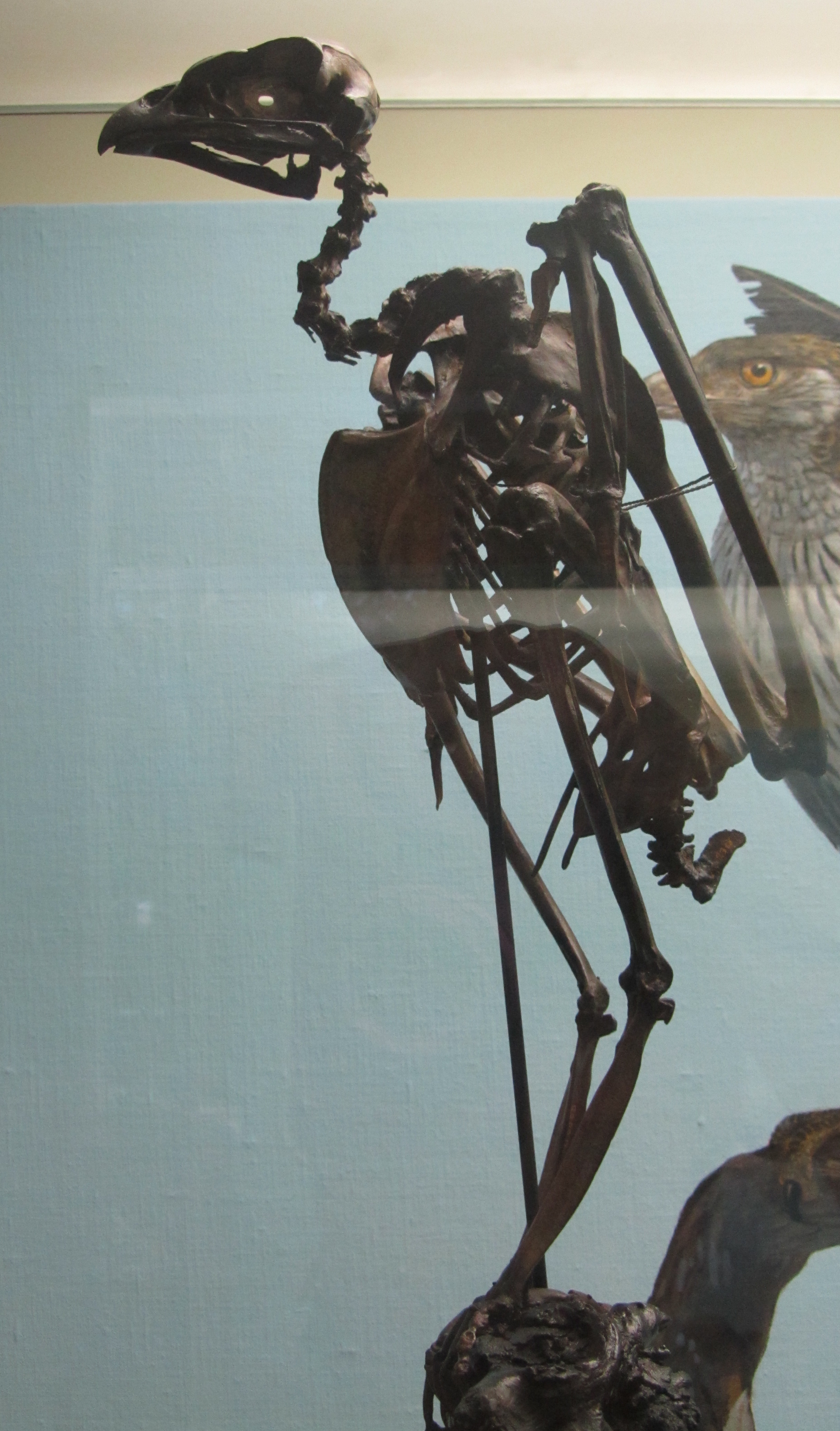
- Mounted fossilized skeleton of the Miocene-modern bird of prey Buteogallus
  Buteogallus

== C ==
- †Caedocyon
  - †Caedocyon tedfordi – type locality for species
- †Caenolambda – type locality for genus
  - †Caenolambda jepseni – type locality for species
  - †Caenolambda pattersoni – type locality for species
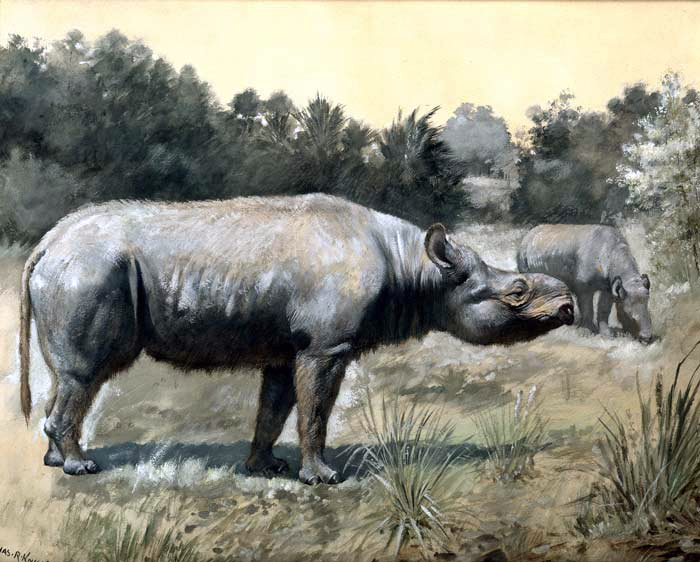
- Life restoration of the Eocene-Oligocene cow-sized rhinoceros Subhyracodon. Charles R. Knight (1890s).
  †Caenopus
  - †Caenopus yoderensis – type locality for species
- †Caesalpinia
  - †Caesalpinia flumen-viridensis
  - †Caesalpinia pecorae
- †Caesalpinites
  - †Caesalpinites falcata – type locality for species
- †Calamagras
  - †Calamagras angulatus – or unidentified comparable form
  - †Calamagras platyspondyla
  - †Calamagras primus – type locality for species
  - †Calamagras weigeli
- †Calamospiza
  - †Calamospiza melanocorys
- †Calandrites
  - †Calandrites cineratius
  - †Calandrites defessus
- †Calcardea – type locality for genus
  - †Calcardea junnei – type locality for species
- Calidris
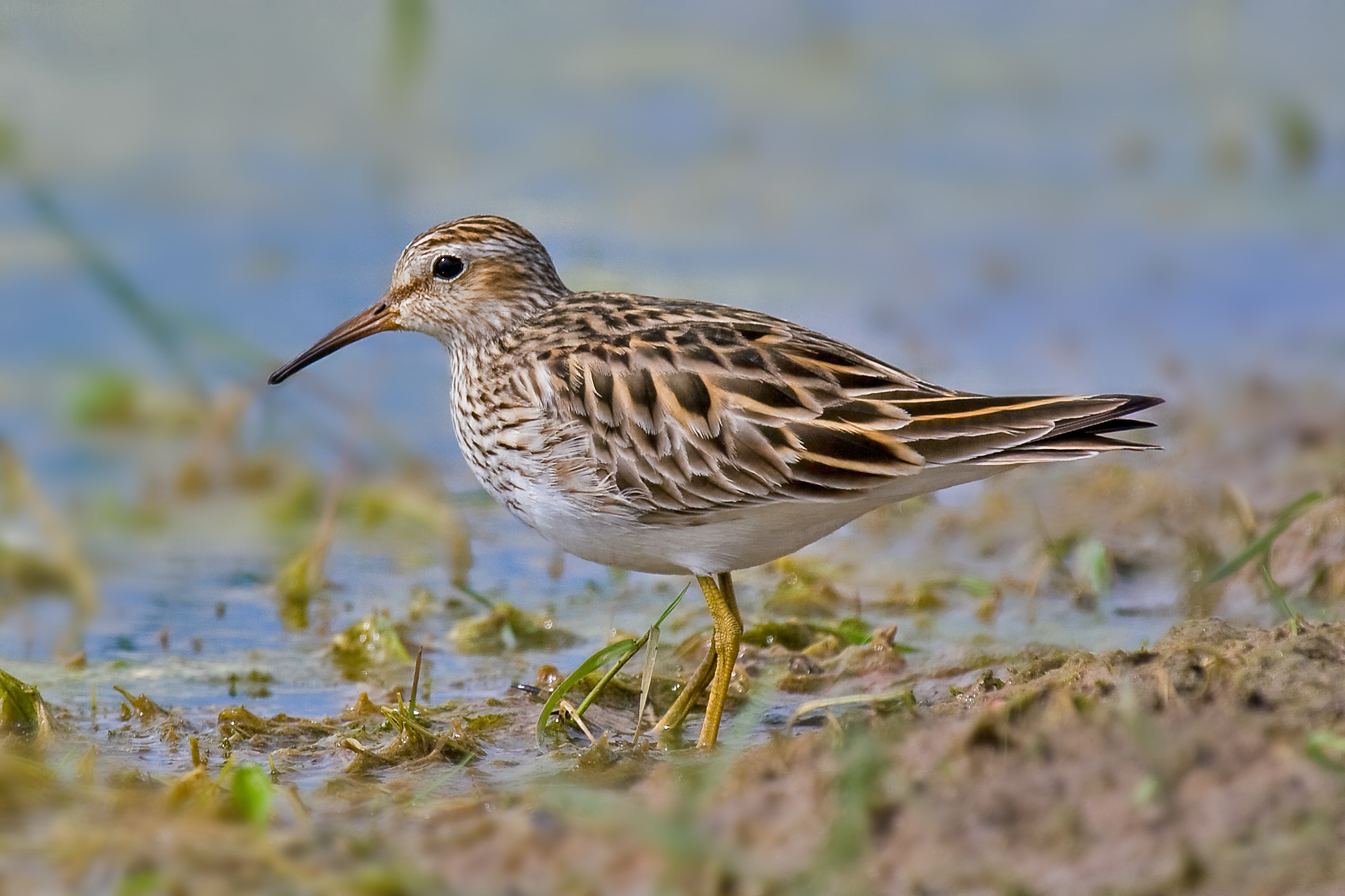
  - A living Calidris melanotos, or pectoral sandpiper
    †Calidris melanotos
- †Callomyia
  - †Callomyia torporata – type locality for species
- †Callospilopteron – type locality for genus
  - †Callospilopteron ocellatum – type locality for species
- †Calycites
  - †Calycites ardtunensis
  - †Calycites hexaphylla
  - †Calycites mikanoides
  - †Calycites polysepala
  - †Calycites RR58 informal
  - †Calycites RR71 informal
- †Camelops
  - †Camelops hesternus – or unidentified comparable form
- †Canarium
  - †Canarium californicum
- †Canavalia
  - †Canavalia diuturna
- Canis
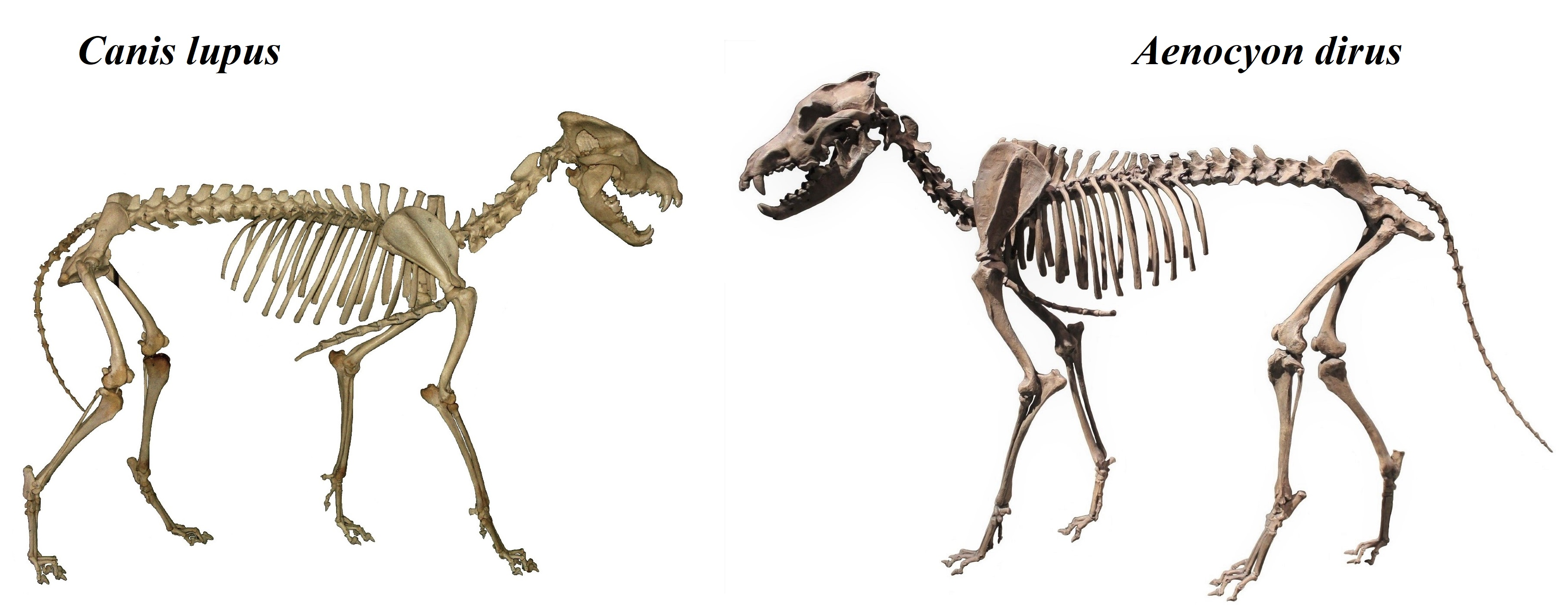
  - Modern mounted skeleton of Canis lupus, the grey wolf, to scale with a fossilized skeleton of the Pleistocene wolf Canis dirus, or dire wolf
    †Canis dirus
  - †Canis latrans
  - †Canis lupus
- †Cantius
  - †Cantius abditus – type locality for species
  - †Cantius frugivorus
  - †Cantius mckennai
  - †Cantius nunienus
  - †Cantius ralstoni
  - †Cantius simonsi – type locality for species
  - †Cantius torresi
  - †Cantius trigonodus – type locality for species
- †Capacikala
  - †Capacikala parvus – type locality for species
- Capella
  - †Capella gallinago
- †Carabites
  - †Carabites kincaidi – type locality for species
- Caracara
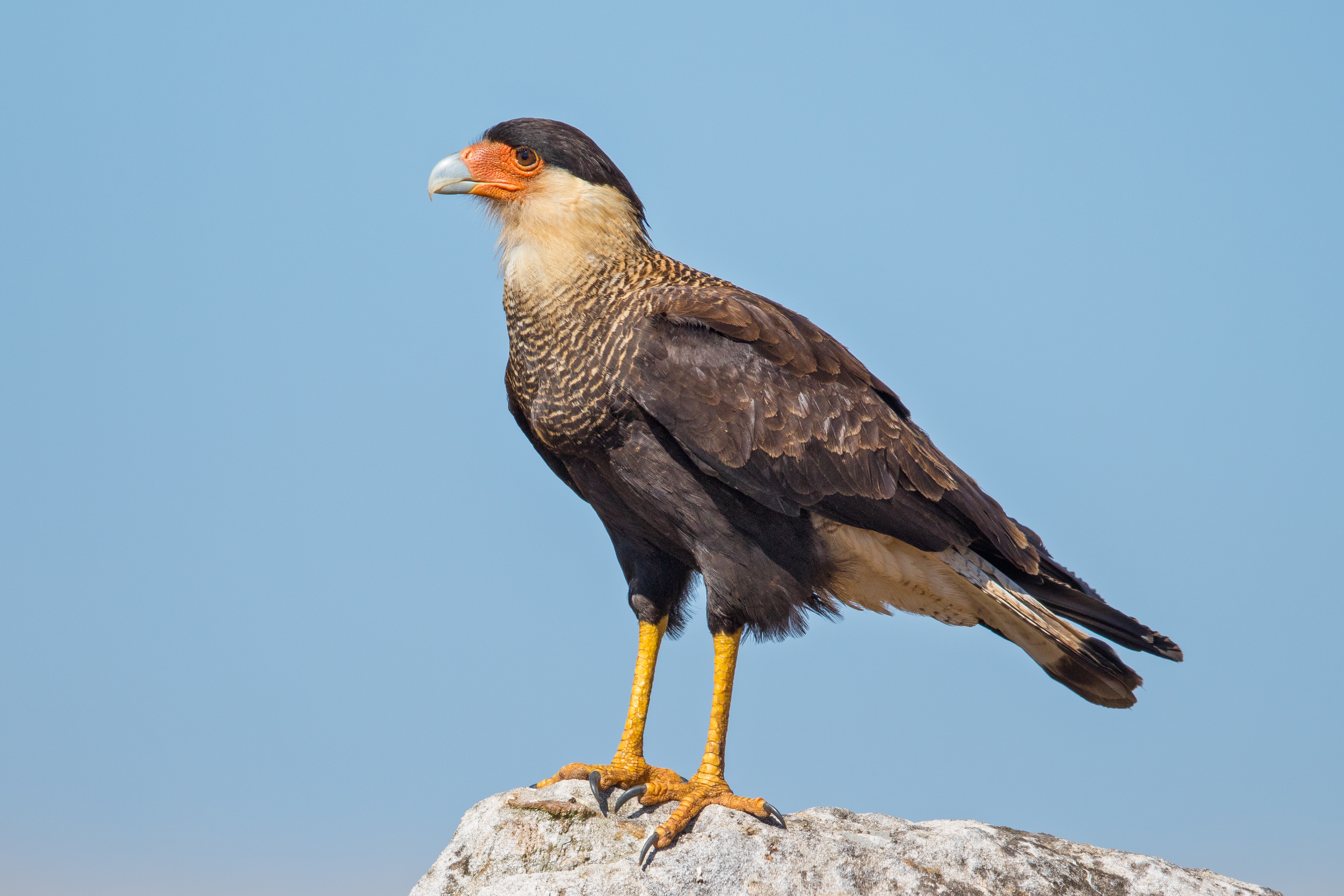
  - A living Caracara plancus, or southern crested caracara
    †Caracara plancus
- †Cardichelyon – type locality for genus
  - †Cardichelyon rogerwoodi – type locality for species
- †Cardiolophus
  - †Cardiolophus radinskyi – type locality for species
  - †Cardiolophus semihians
- Cardiospermum
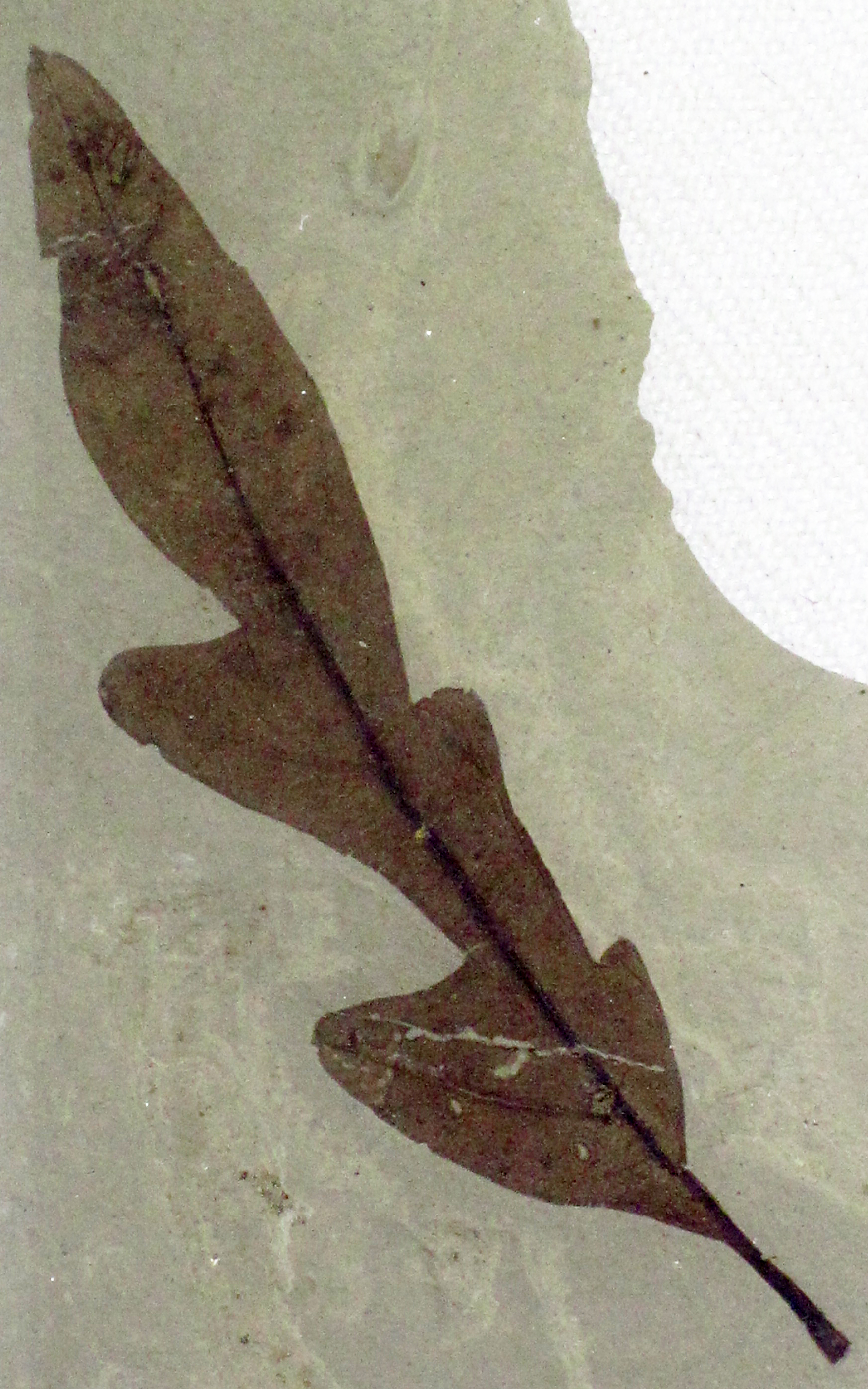
  - A Cardiospermum coloradensis leaf
    †Cardiospermum coloradensis
- Carduelis
- †Carpites
  - †Carpites newberryana
  - †Carpites pedunculatus
  - †Carpites verrucosus
- †Carpodaptes
  - †Carpodaptes hazelae
  - †Carpodaptes hobackensis
  - †Carpodaptes jepseni
  - †Carpodaptes rosei
  - †Carpodaptes stonleyi
- †Carpolestes
  - †Carpolestes dubius – type locality for species
  - †Carpolestes nigridens
  - †Carpolestes twelvemilensis – type locality for species
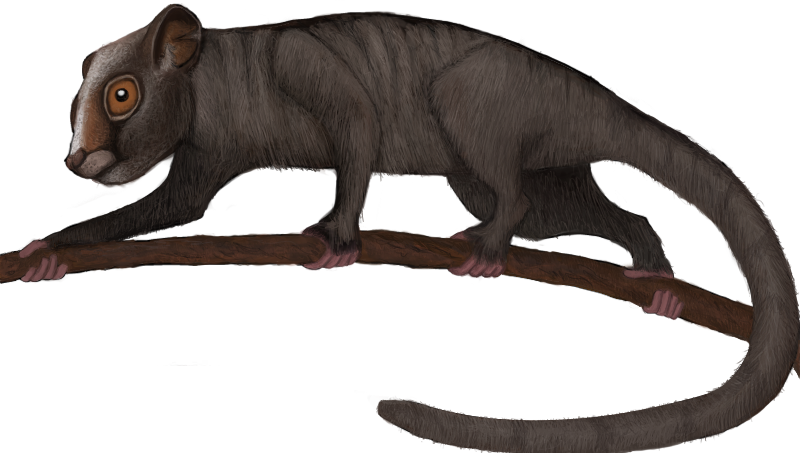
  - Life restoration of the Paleocene primate relative Carpolestes simpsoni
    †Carpolestes simpsoni – type locality for species
- †Carpolithes
  - †Carpolithes osseus
- Carya
  - †Carya antiquorum
  - †Carya veripites
  - †Carya viridifluminipites
- Castanea
  - †Castanea intermedia
  - †Castanea pulchella
- Castor
  - †Castor peninsulatus
- †Catopsalis
  - †Catopsalis alexanderi
  - †Catopsalis calgariensis
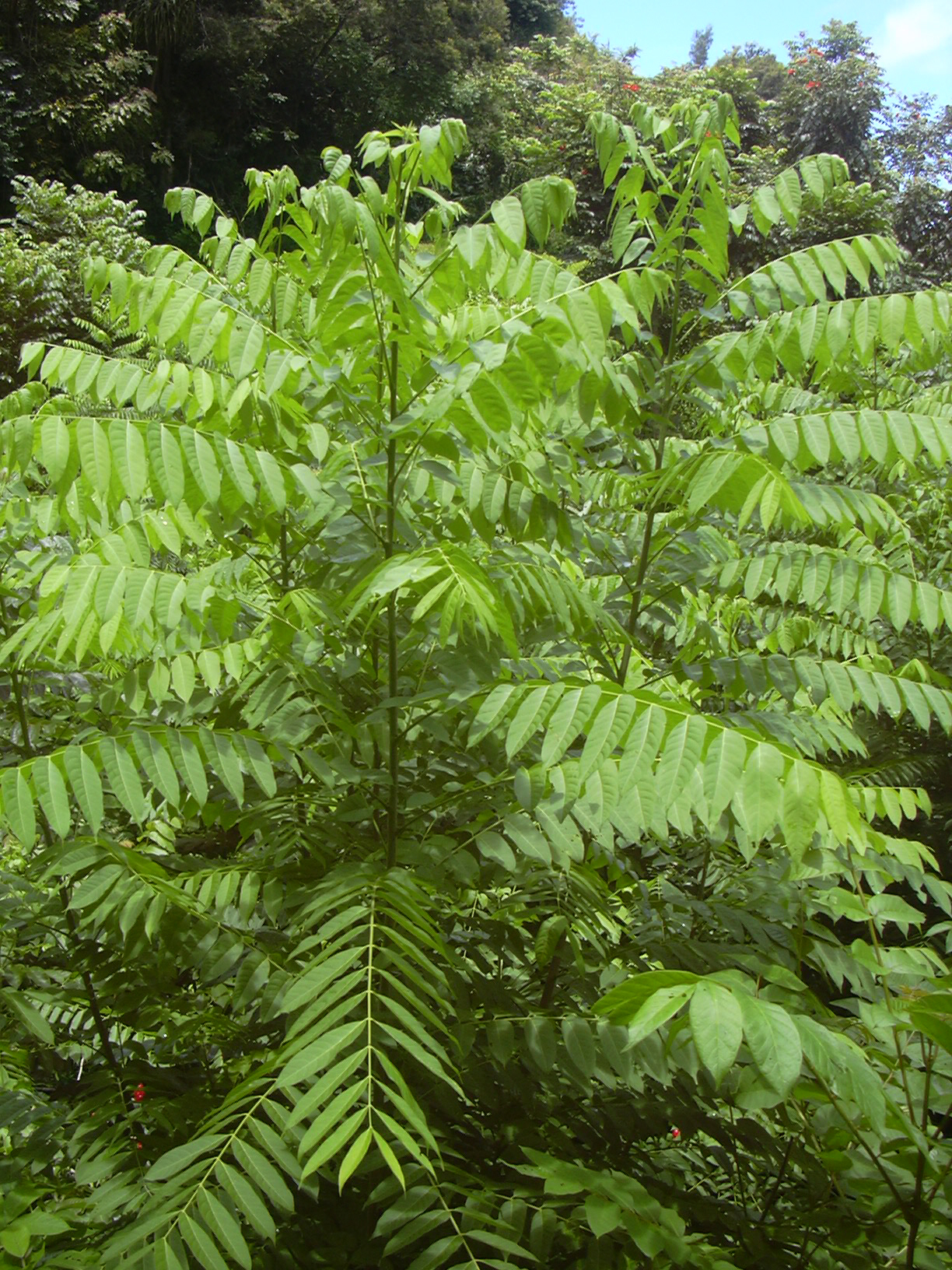
- Living Cedrela trees
  Cedrela
  - †Cedrela trainii
- †Cedrelospermum
  - †Cedrelospermum lineatum
  - †Cedrelospermum nervosum
- †Cedrobaena – type locality for genus
  - †Cedrobaena putorius
- †Cedrocherus
  - †Cedrocherus aceratus – type locality for species
  - †Cedrocherus ryani – type locality for species
- †Cedromus
  - †Cedromus wardi
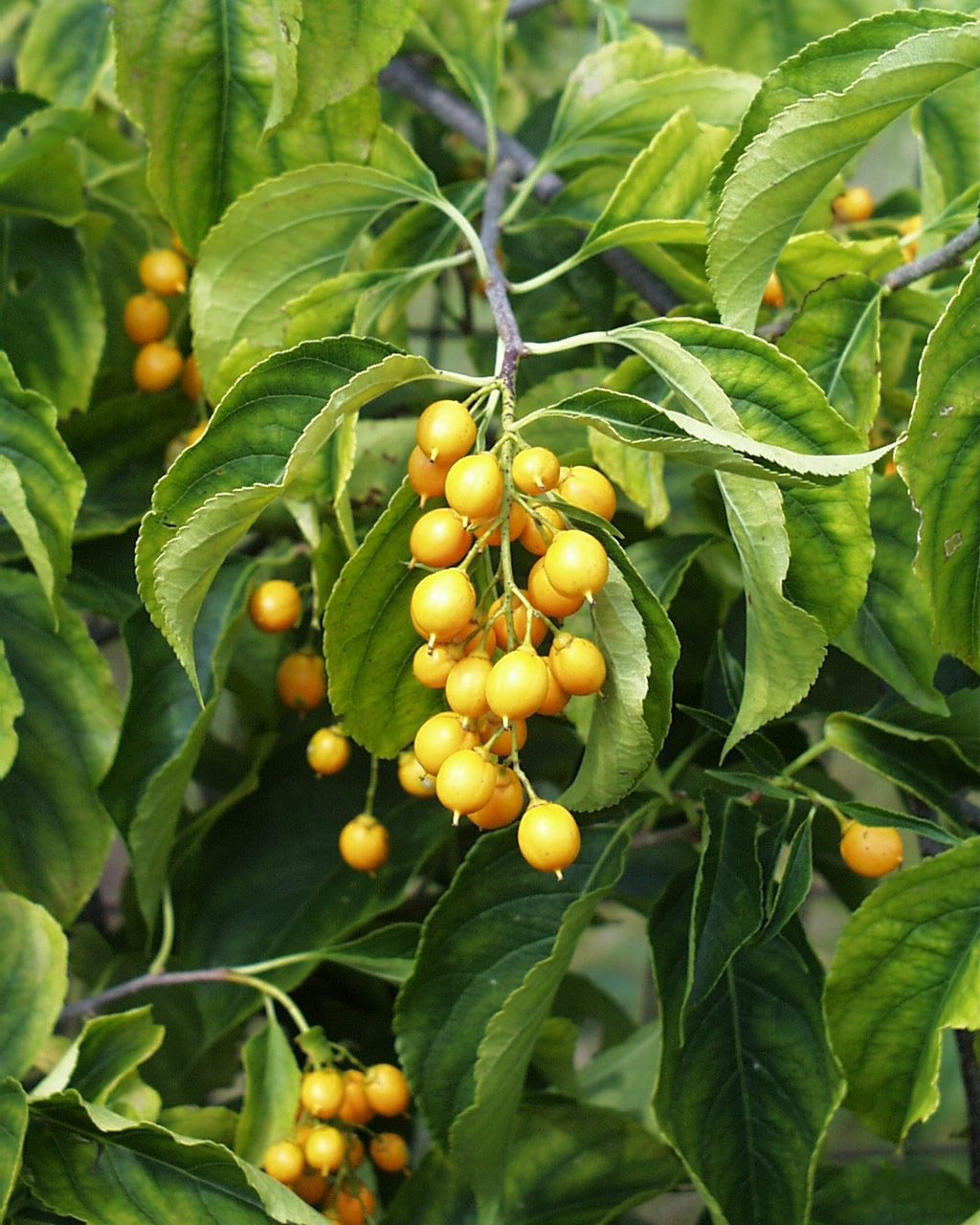
- Foliage and fruit of a living Celastrus, or staff vine
  †Celastrus
  - †Celastrus culveri
  - †Celastrus ellipticus
  - †Celastrus inaequalis
  - †Celastrus winchesteri
- †Celliforma
  - †Celliforma spirifer
- Celtis
  - †Celtis aspera
  - †Celtis newberryi
  - †Celtis peracuminata
  - †Celtis phenacodorum
- †Centetodon
  - †Centetodon bacchanalis
  - †Centetodon bembicophagus
  - †Centetodon chadronensis
  - †Centetodon hendryi
  - †Centetodon magnus
  - †Centetodon marginalis
  - †Centetodon neashami – type locality for species
  - †Centetodon patratus
  - †Centetodon pulcher
- †Centrinus
  - †Centrinus diruptus – type locality for species
- †Centrocercus
  - †Centrocercus urophasianus
- †Cephalogale
- †Ceratophyllum
  - †Ceratophyllum muricatum
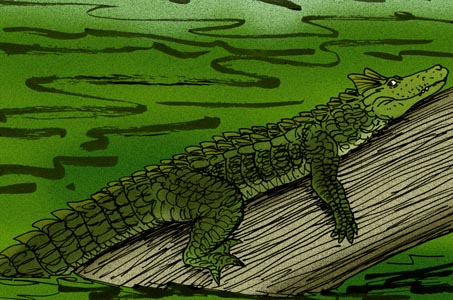
- Life restoration of the Paleocene-Eocene crocodilian Ceratosuchus
  †Ceratosuchus
  - †Ceratosuchus burdoshi
- Cercidiphyllum
  - †Cercidiphyllum arcticum
  - †Cercidiphyllum articum
  - †Cercidiphyllum BB21 informal
  - †Cercidiphyllum BB34-52 informal
  - †Cercidiphyllum genetrix
  - †Cercidiphyllum tiny winged seeds informal
  - †Cercidiphyllum tiny wingedseeds informal
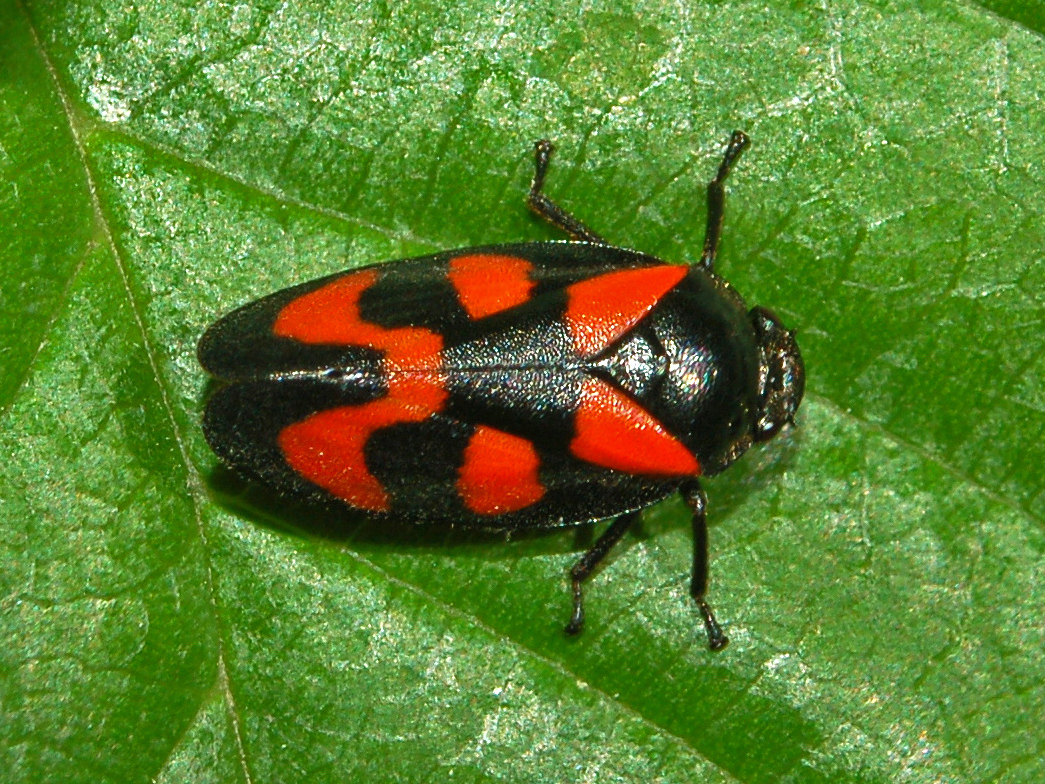
- A living Cercopis froghopper
  †Cercopis
  - †Cercopis astricta – type locality for species
- †Cercopites – type locality for genus
  - †Cercopites calliscens – type locality for species
  - †Cercopites umbratilis – type locality for species
- †Ceutholestes
  - †Ceutholestes dolosus – type locality for species
  - †Ceutholestes acerbus – type locality for species
- †Chadrolagus
  - †Chadrolagus emryi
- †Chaetoptelea
  - †Chaetoptelea microphylla
  - †Chaetoptelea pseudofulva – tentative report
- †Chalicomomys
  - †Chalicomomys willwoodensis – type locality for species
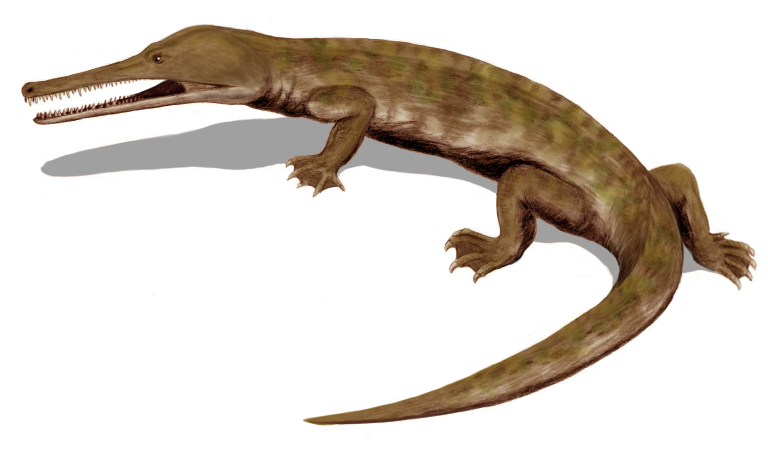
- Life restoration of the Late Cretaceous-Eocene choristoderan reptile Champsosaurus
  †Champsosaurus
  - †Champsosaurus gigas
- †Chaneya
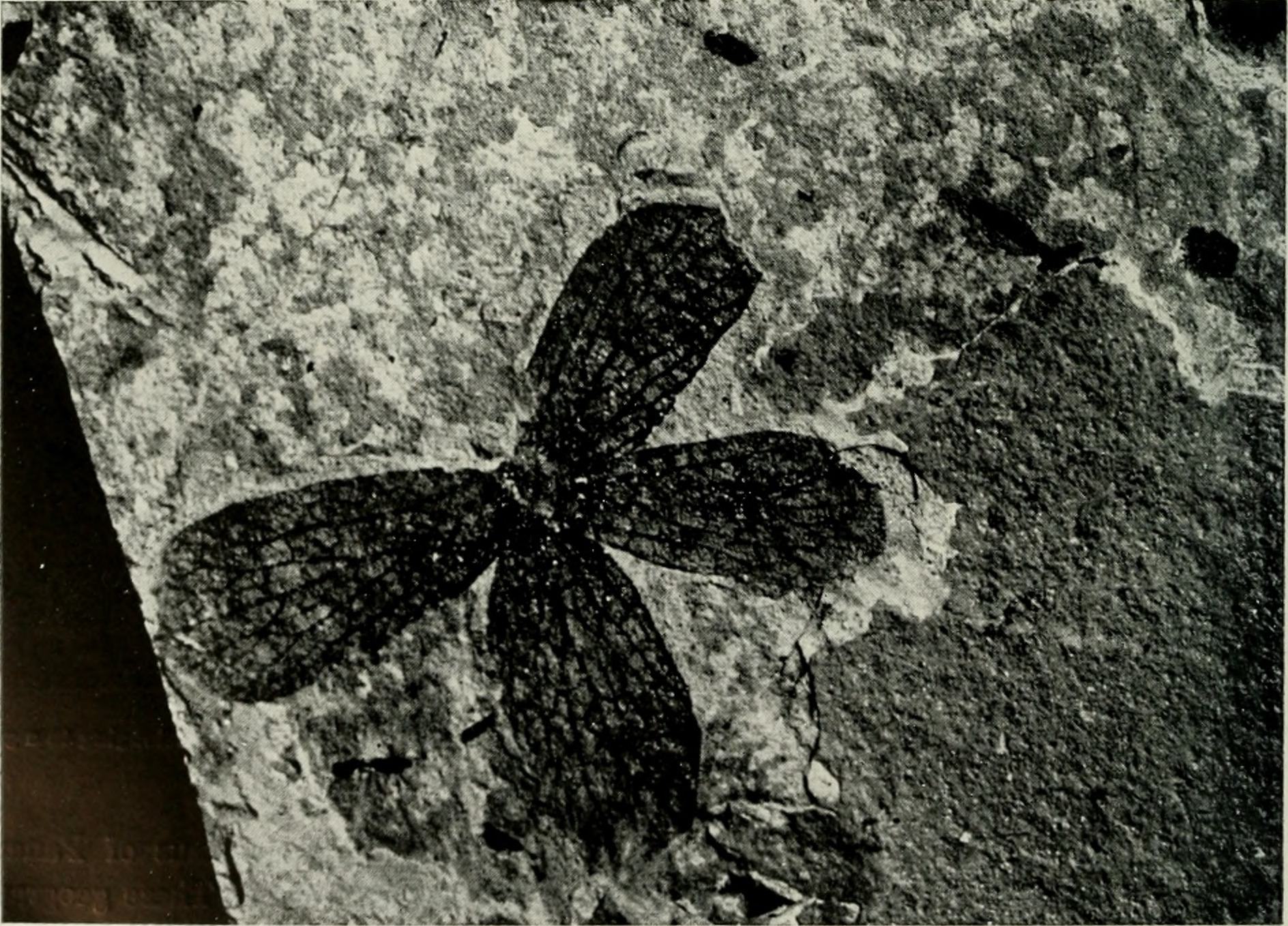
  - †Chaneya tenuis
    †Chaneya tenuis
- Chara
- Charadrius
  - †Charadrius montanus
  - †Charadrius vociferus
- Charina
  - †Charina prebottae
- Cheilosia
  - †Cheilosia ampla – type locality for species
  - †Cheilosia scudderi
- †Chelomophrynus – type locality for genus
  - †Chelomophrynus bayi – type locality for species
- †Chilostigma – tentative report
  - †Chilostigma ostracoderma
- †Chiromyoides
  - †Chiromyoides caesor – type locality for species
  - †Chiromyoides kesiwah – type locality for species
  - †Chiromyoides major – type locality for species
  - †Chiromyoides minor – type locality for species
  - †Chiromyoides potior
- Chironomus
  - †Chironomus septus – type locality for species
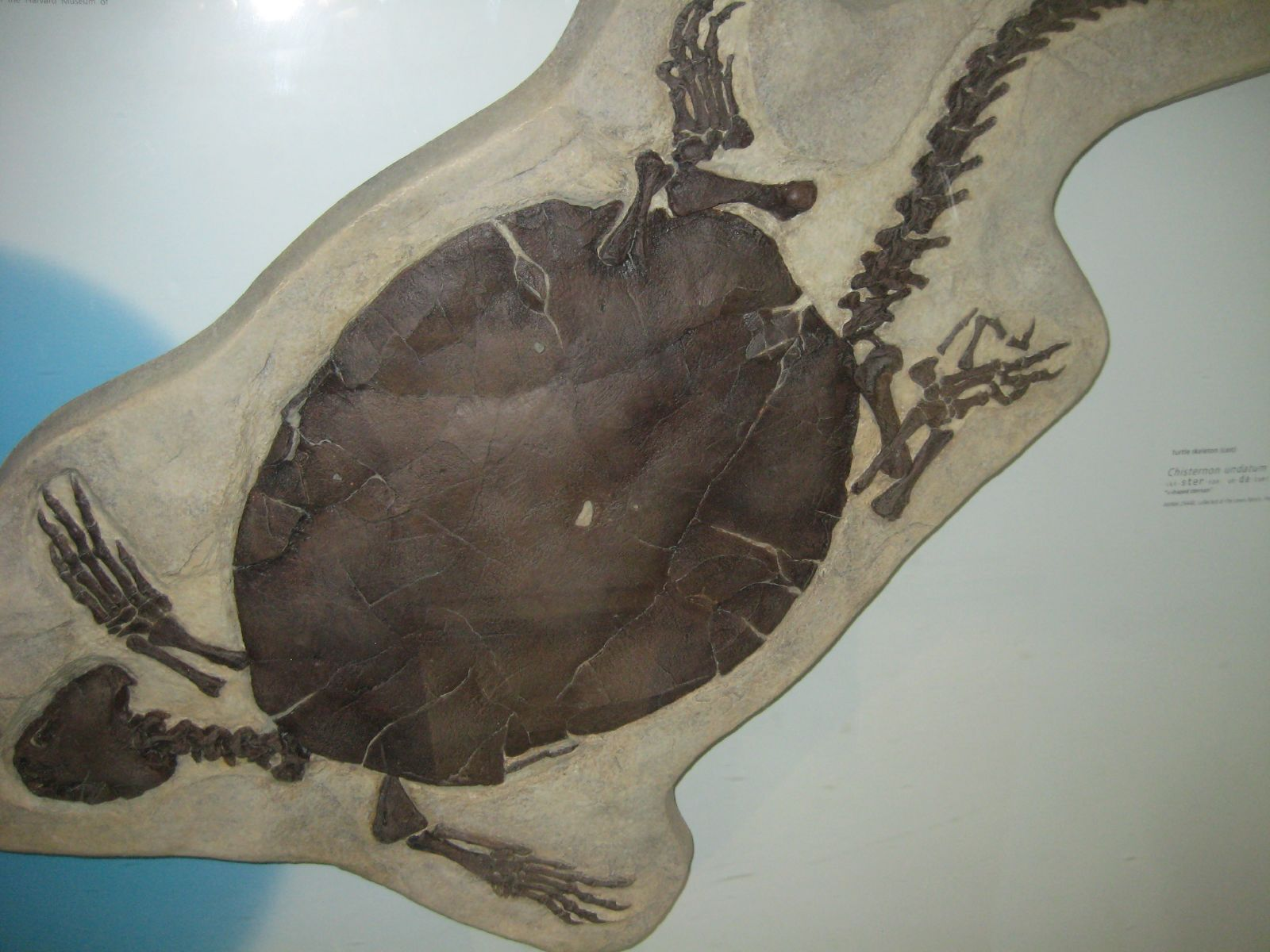
- Fossilized skeleton of the Eocene turtle Chisternon
  †Chisternon
  - †Chisternon hebraicum – type locality for species
  - †Chisternon undatum – type locality for species
- †Chlororhysis
  - †Chlororhysis incomptus – type locality for species
  - †Chlororhysis knightensis – type locality for species
- †Choctawius – or unidentified comparable form
- †Cholula
  - †Cholula triguttata – type locality for species
- †Choragus
  - †Choragus fictilis – type locality for species
- †Chordeiles
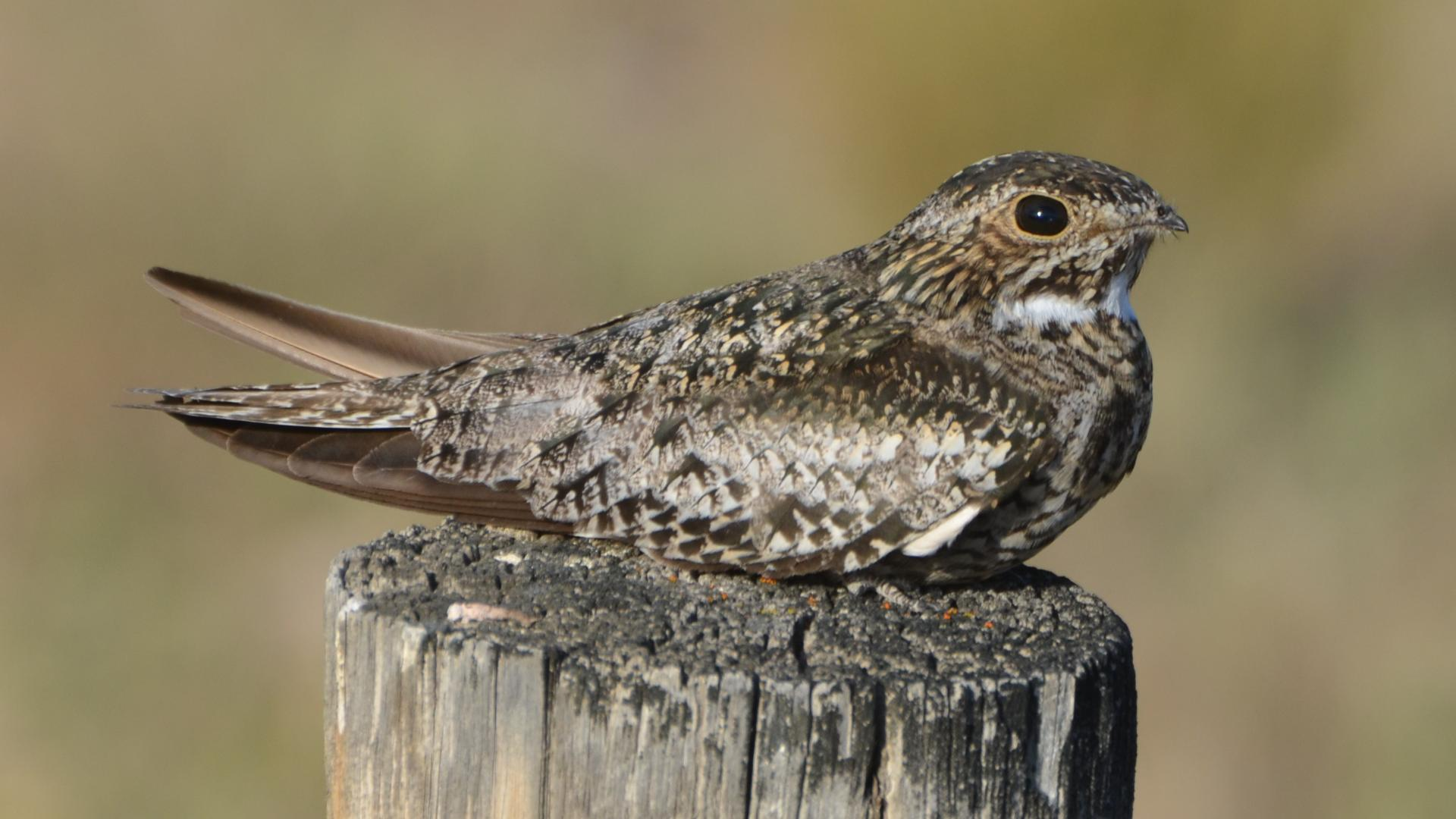
  - A living Chordeiles minor, or common nighthawk
    †Chordeiles minor
- †Chriacus
  - †Chriacus badgleyi
  - †Chriacus baldwini
  - †Chriacus gallinae
  - †Chriacus katrinae
  - †Chriacus oconostotae
  - †Chriacus pelvidens
- †Chumashius
- †Cicadula
  - †Cicadula saxosa – type locality for species
- †Cimolestes
- †Cinnamomophyllum
  - †Cinnamomophyllum RR19 informal
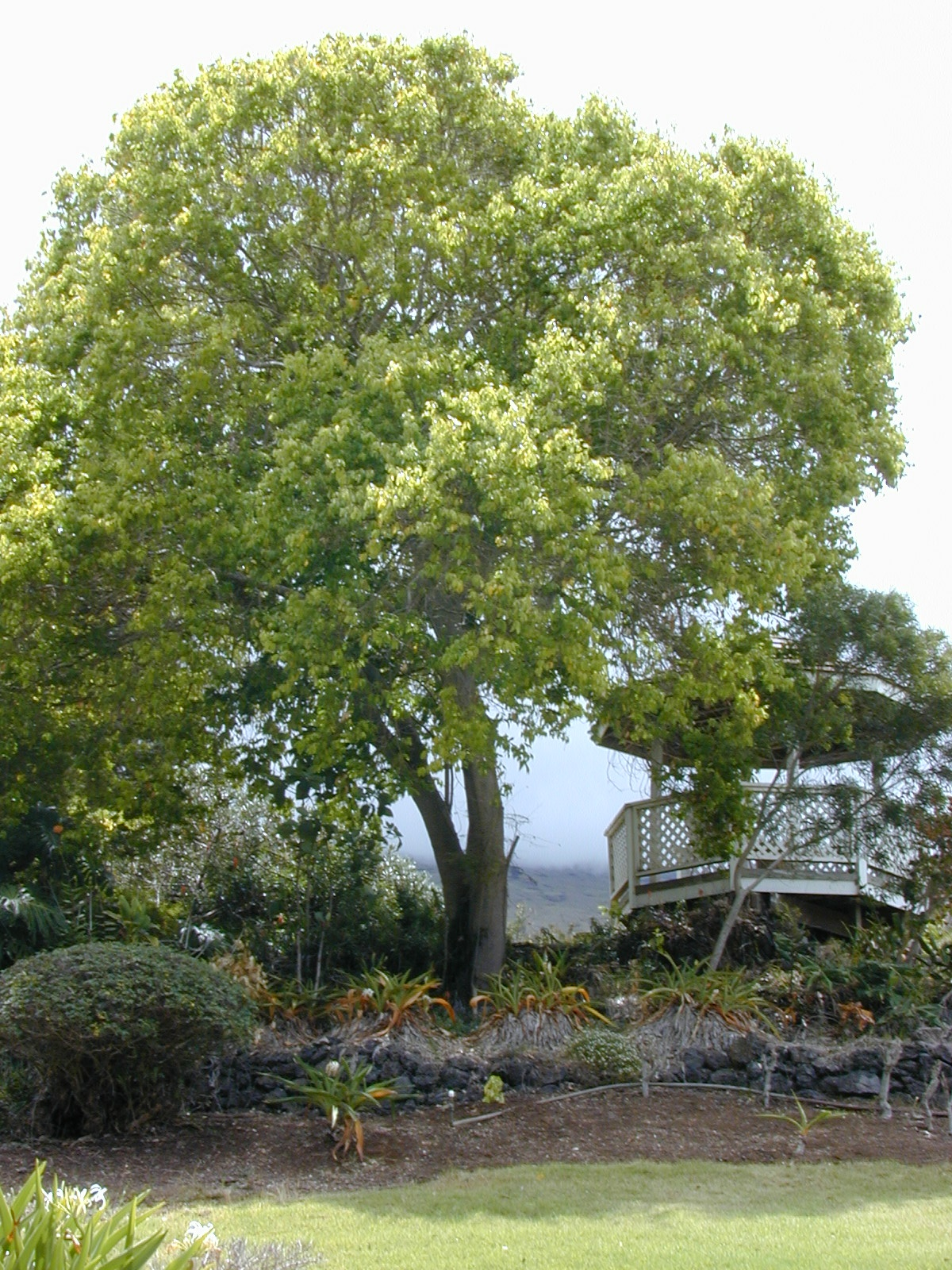
- A living Cinnamomum, or cinnamon tree
  Cinnamomum
  - †Cinnamomum sezannense
  - †Cinnamomum spectabilis
- Circus
  - †Circus cyaneus
- †Cissites
  - †Cissites rocklandensis
- Cissus
  - †Cissus haguei
  - †Cissus marginata
  - †Cissus marginatus
- †Cixius – tentative report
  - †Cixius hesperidum – type locality for species
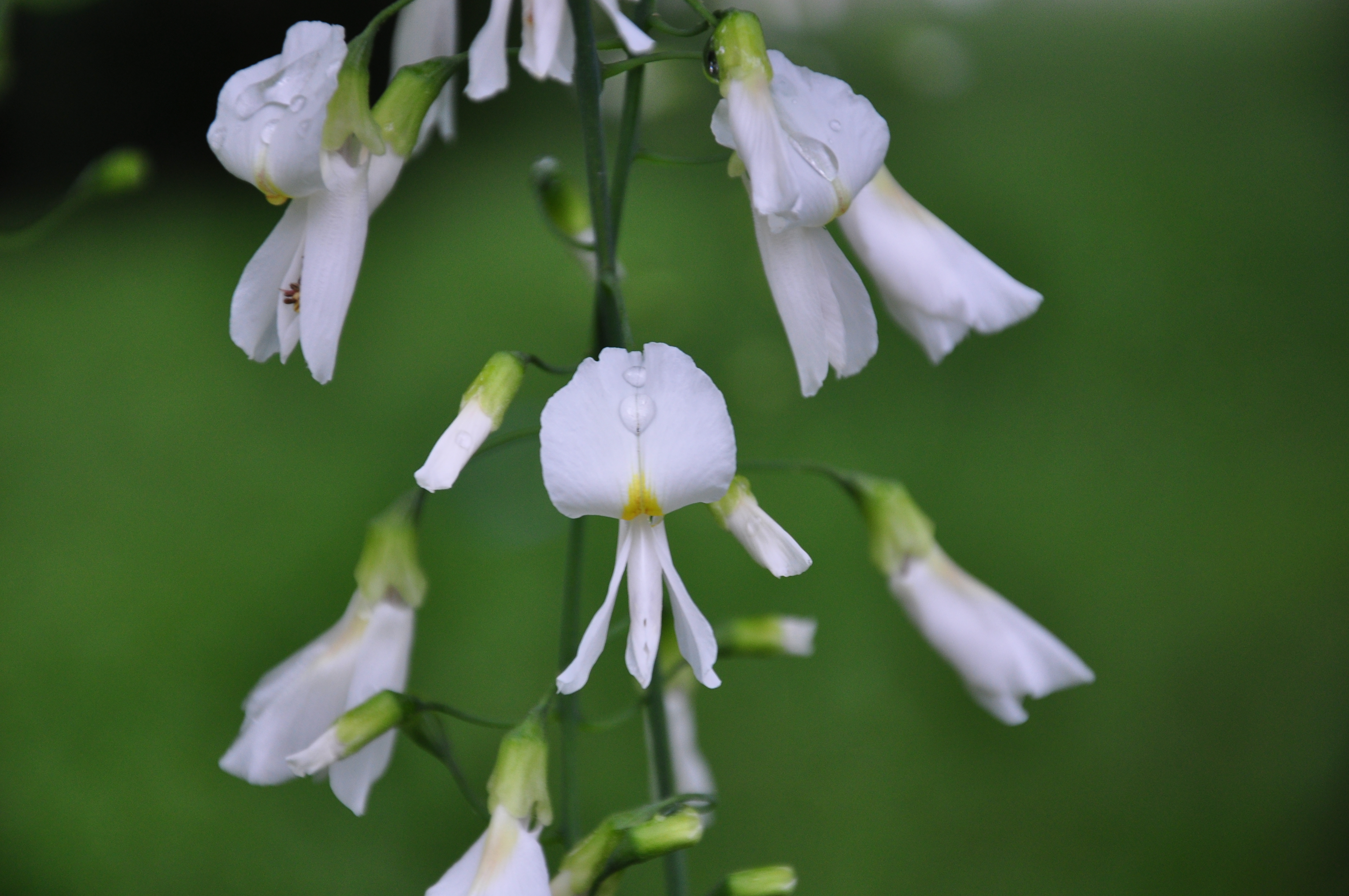
- Flowers of a living Cladrastis, or yellowwood
  Cladrastis
  - †Cladrastis GR579 informal
  - †Cladrastis GR580 informal
- †Claenodon
  - †Claenodon montanensis
- †Cnemidaria
  - †Cnemidaria magna
- †Coccothraustes
  - †Coccothraustes vespertinus
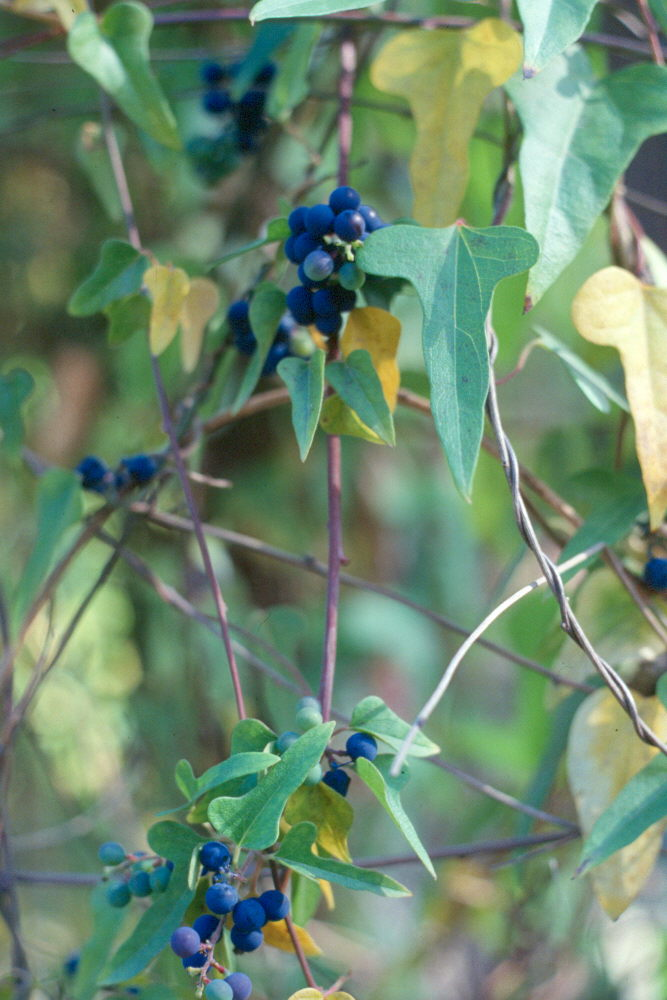
- Fruit and foliage of a living Cocculus, or moonseed
  Cocculus
  - †Cocculus flabella
- †Coelidia
  - †Coelidia wyomingensis – type locality for species
- Colaptes
  - †Colaptes auratus
- †Colodon
  - †Colodon woodi
- †Colpocherus
- †Colpoclaenus
  - †Colpoclaenus keeferi – type locality for species
  - †Colpoclaenus procyonoides – or unidentified comparable form
- Colymbus
  - †Colymbus nigricollis
- †Compsemys
  - †Compsemys victa
- †Conacodon
  - †Conacodon cophater – or unidentified comparable form
  - †Conacodon delphae
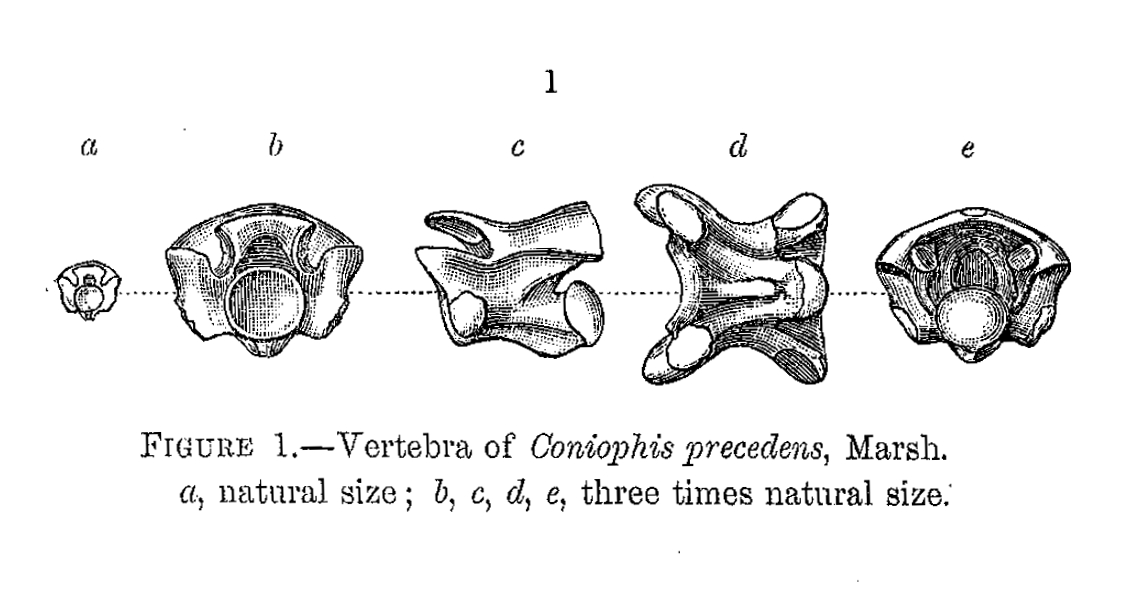
- Illustration of fossilized vertebrae of the Late Cretaceous-Eocene snake Coniophis. Othniel Charles Marsh (1892).
  †Coniophis
  - †Coniophis carinatus – type locality for species
  - †Coniophis platycarinatus – type locality for species
- †Copecion
  - †Copecion brachypternus
  - †Copecion davisi
- †Copedelphys
  - †Copedelphys stevensoni
- †Copelemur
  - †Copelemur australotutus – type locality for species
  - †Copelemur praetutus
  - †Copelemur tutus
- †Copemys
  - †Copemys longidens
- †Coriphagus
  - †Coriphagus encinensis – or unidentified comparable form
  - †Coriphagus montanus
- †Corizus – tentative report
  - †Corizus guttatus – type locality for species
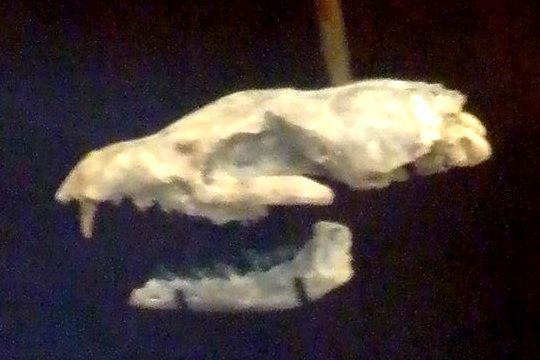
- Fossilized skull of the Oligocene-Miocene bone-crushing dog Cormocyon
  †Cormocyon
  - †Cormocyon haydeni
- Cornus
  - †Cornus hyperborea
  - †Cornus nebrascensis
  - †Cornus newberryi
  - †Cornus wrightii
- Corvus
  - †Corvus brachyrhynchos
  - †Corvus corax
- †Corylites
  - †Corylites FW01 informal
- †Corylus
  - †Corylus insignis
  - †Corylus macquarryi
- Corymbites
  - †Corymbites velatus – type locality for species
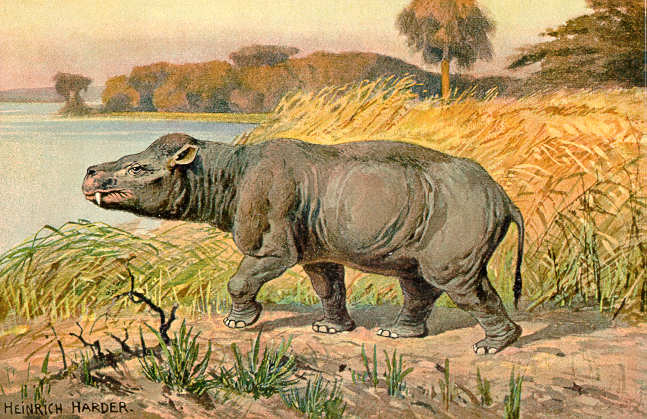
- Life restoration of the Paleocene-Eocene pantodont mammal Coryphodon. Heinrich Harder (1920).
  †Coryphodon
  - †Coryphodon armatus
  - †Coryphodon eocaenus
  - †Coryphodon lobatus
  - †Coryphodon proterus
  - †Coryphodon radians
- †Cranea
  - †Cranea wyomingensis
- Crataegus
- †Credneria
  - †Credneria daturaefolia – tentative report
  - †Credneria pachyphylla
- †Cristadjidaumo
  - †Cristadjidaumo skinneri – type locality for species
- Crocodylus
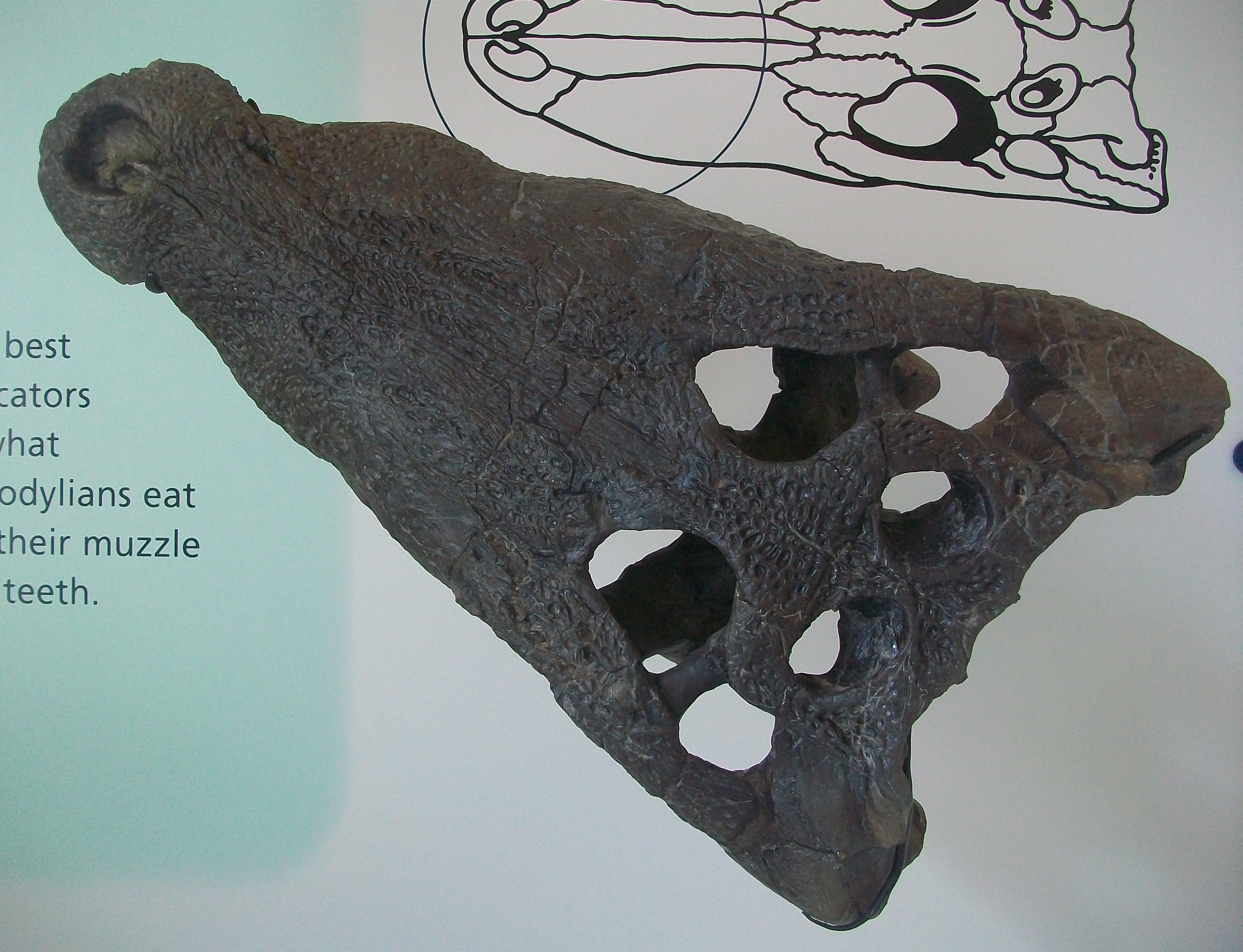
  - Fossilized skull of the Eocene crocodilian "Crocodylus" affinis
    †Crocodylus affinis – type locality for species
  - †Crocodylus ziphodon – type locality for species
- †Cryptocephalus
  - †Cryptocephalus vetustus – type locality for species
- Cryptorhynchus
  - †Cryptorhynchus annosus – type locality for species
- Cryptotis
- Culex
  - †Culex damnatorum – type locality for species
- †Cupanieidites
  - †Cupanieidites inaequalis
  - †Cupanieidites inaequatis
- †Cupidinimus
  - †Cupidinimus whitlocki
- †Cycadopites
  - †Cycadopites follicularis
- Cyclocarya
- †Cyclurus
  - †Cyclurus fragosus
- †Cylindrodon
  - †Cylindrodon natronensis – type locality for species
  - †Cylindrodon solarborus – type locality for species
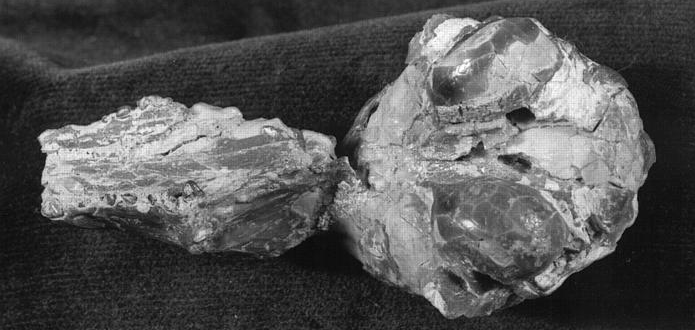
- Underside of a fossilized cranium of the Oligocene-Miocene bone-crushing dog Cynarctoides
  †Cynarctoides
  - †Cynarctoides acridens
  - †Cynarctoides harlowi
  - †Cynarctoides luskensis – type locality for species
- †Cyperacites
  - †Cyperacites angustior
  - †Cyperacites filiferus
  - †Cyperacites giganteus
- †Cyriacotherium
  - †Cyriacotherium argyreum – type locality for species
  - †Cyriacotherium psamminum – type locality for species
- †Cyrilavis
  - †Cyrilavis olsoni – type locality for species
- †Cyrtomenus
  - †Cyrtomenus concinnus – type locality for species

== D ==
- †Dalbergia
- †Daphoenictis
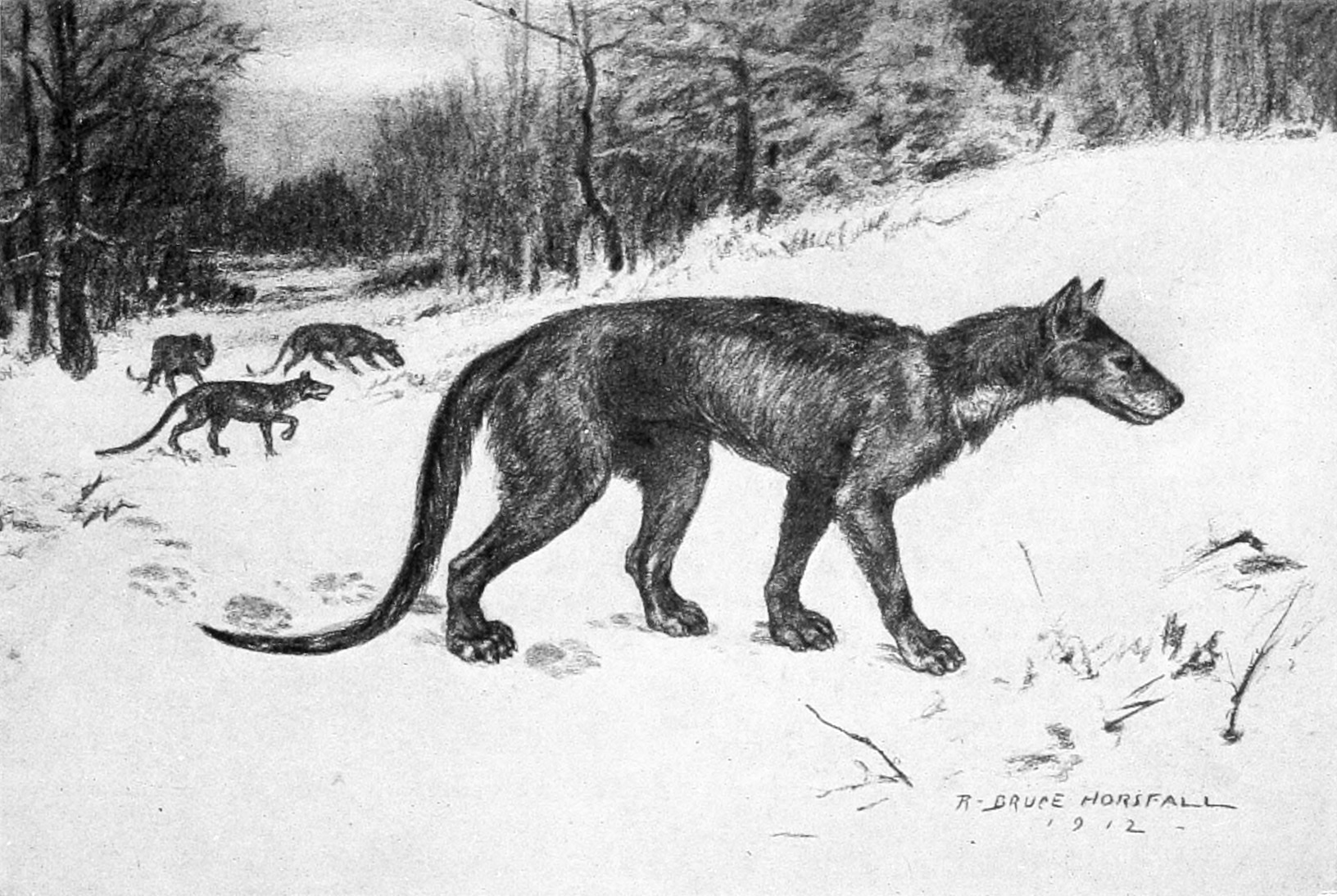
- Life restoration of the Miocene bear-dog Daphoenodon
  †Daphoenodon
  - †Daphoenodon falkenbachi – type locality for species
  - †Daphoenodon niobrarensis
  - †Daphoenodon skinneri – type locality for species
  - †Daphoenodon superbus
- †Daphoenus
  - †Daphoenus lambei
- †Dartonius
  - †Dartonius jepseni
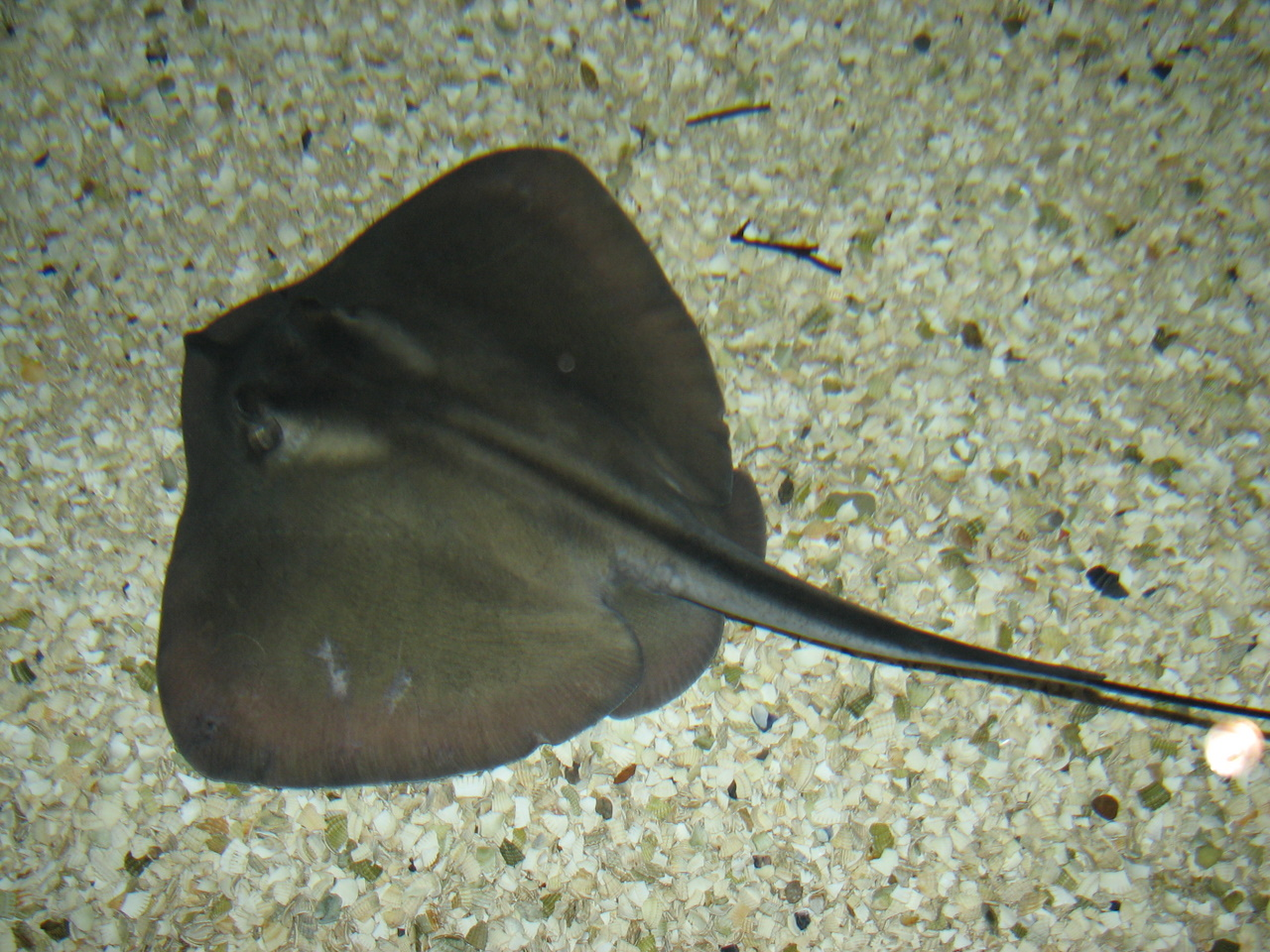
- A living Dasyatis stingray
  Dasyatis
- †Davidia
  - †Davidia antiqua
- †Dawsonicyon – type locality for genus
  - †Dawsonicyon isami – type locality for species
- †Dawsonomys
  - †Dawsonomys woodi
- †Dawsonophis – type locality for genus
  - †Dawsonophis wyomingensis – type locality for species
- †Debeya
- †Decatoma
  - †Decatoma antiqua – type locality for species
- †Delotrochanter
  - †Delotrochanter major – type locality for species
- Dendragapus
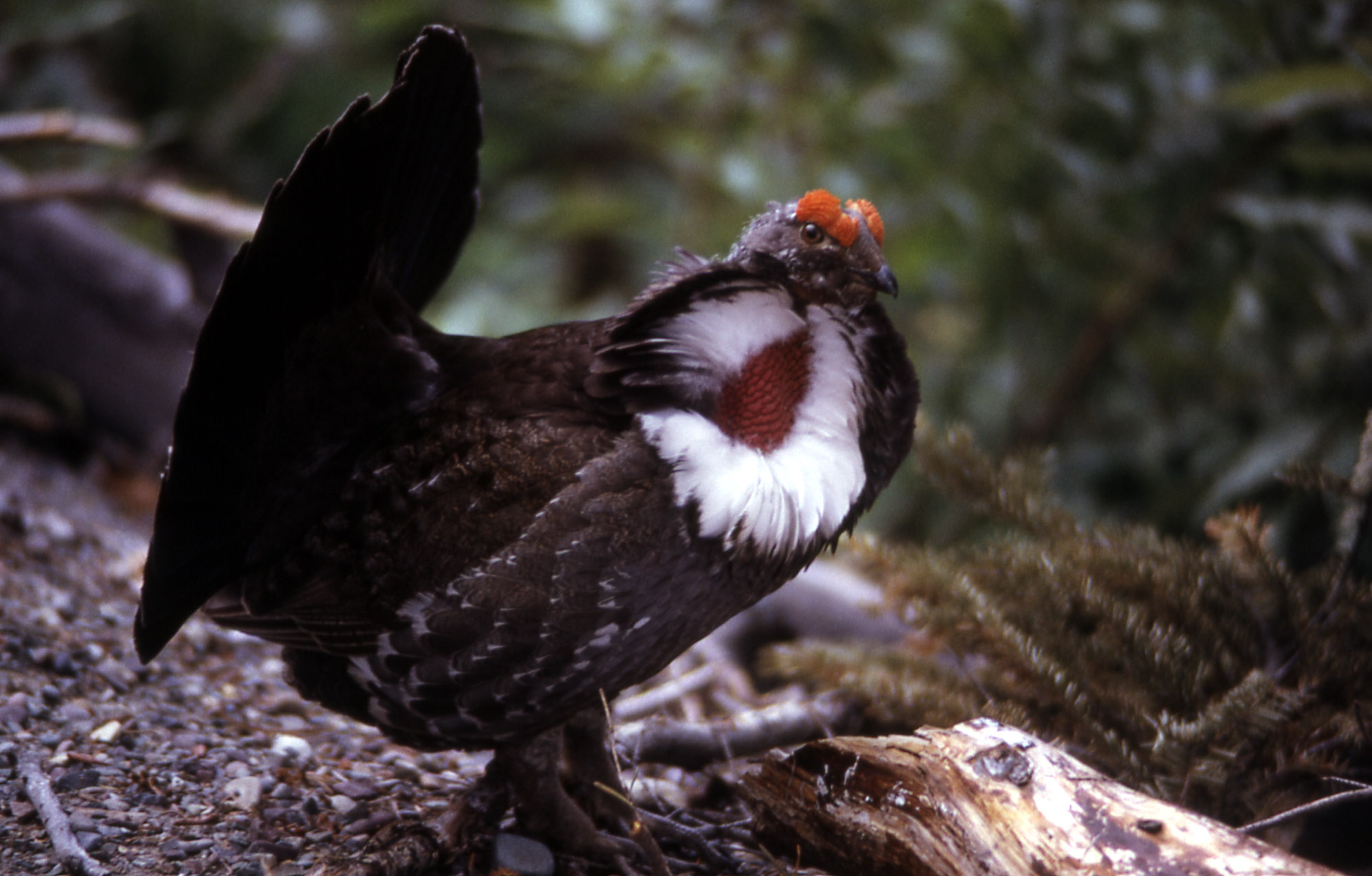
  - A living Dendragapus obscurus, or dusky grouse
    †Dendragapus obscurus
- †Dendropanax
  - †Dendropanax latens
- †Dennstaedia
  - †Dennstaedia americana
- †Dennstaedtia
  - †Dennstaedtia americana
- †Dennstaedtiopsis
  - †Dennstaedtiopsis aerenchymata
- †Desmatippus
  - †Desmatippus tyleri
- †Desmatochoerus
  - †Desmatochoerus hatcheri
  - †Desmatochoerus megalodon
- †Desmatoclaenus
  - †Desmatoclaenus mearae
- †Desmatolagus
  - †Desmatolagus schizopetrus
- †Desmatotherium
  - †Desmatotherium intermedius
- †Desmocyon
  - †Desmocyon thomsoni
- †Devallia – tentative report
  - †Devallia montana
- †Diacocherus
  - †Diacocherus meizon – type locality for species
  - †Diacocherus minutus
- †Diacodexis
  - †Diacodexis ilicis
  - †Diacodexis kelleyi
  - †Diacodexis kellyi
  - †Diacodexis metsiacus
  - †Diacodexis minutus
  - †Diacodexis primus
  - †Diacodexis secans
  - †Diacodexis woltonensis – type locality for species
- †Diacodon
  - †Diacodon celatus
- †Diaplegma
  - †Diaplegma obdormitum – type locality for species
- †Diatryma – type locality for genus
  - †Diatryma gigantea – type locality for species
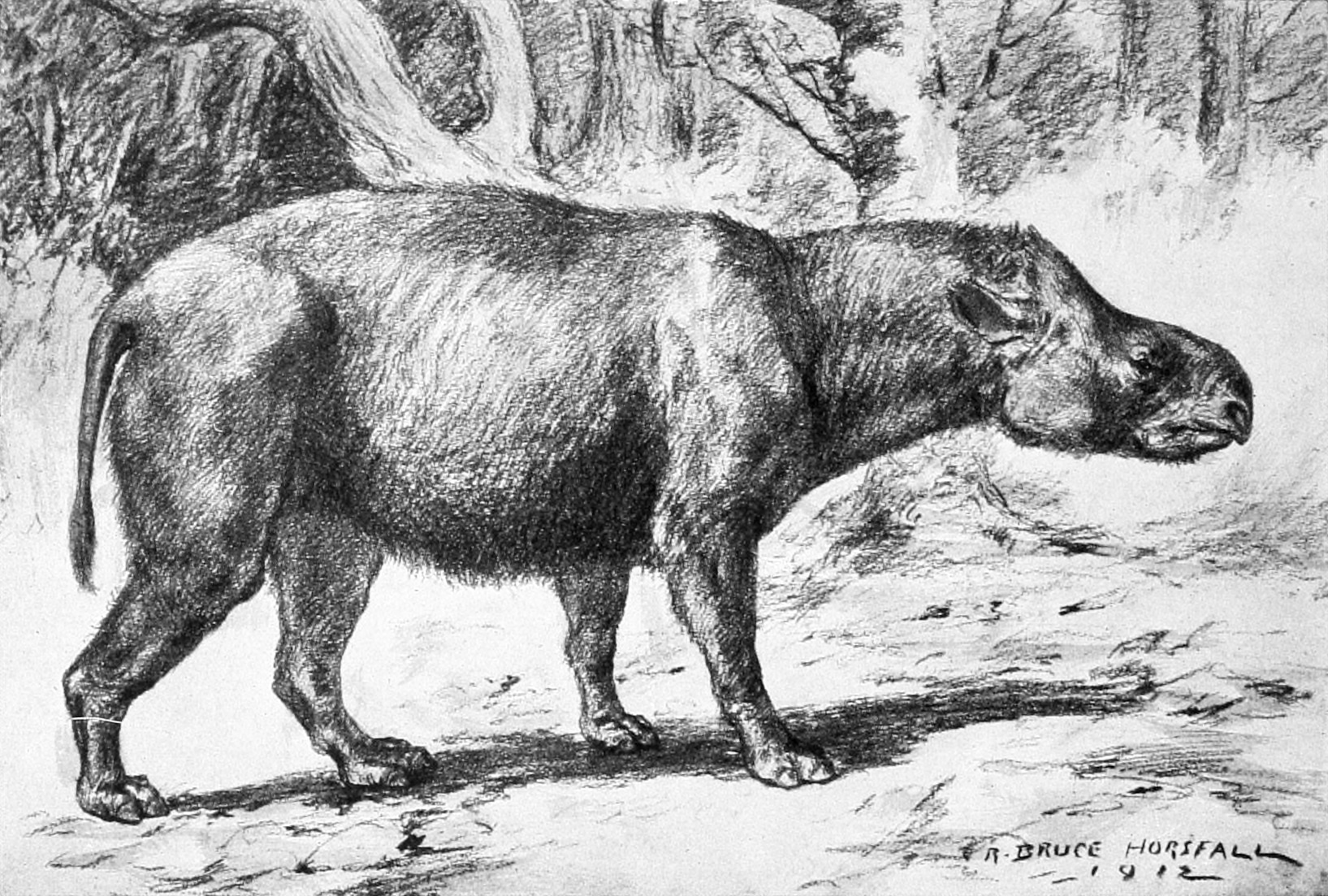
- Restoration of the Oligocene-Miocene hornless rhinoceros Diceratherium. Robert Bruce Horsfall (1913).
  †Diceratherium
  - †Diceratherium annectens
  - †Diceratherium armatum
  - †Diceratherium tridactylum
- Dicotylophyllum
  - †Dicotylophyllum anomalum
  - †Dicotylophyllum mercerensis
- Dicranomyia
  - †Dicranomyia primitiva
  - †Dicranomyia rhodolitha – type locality for species
- Dicrostonyx
- †Didelphodontine
- †Didelphodus
  - †Didelphodus absarokae
  - †Didelphodus altidens
- †Didymictis
  - †Didymictis altidens
  - †Didymictis leptomylus
  - †Didymictis protenus
  - †Didymictis proteus
  - †Didymictis vancleveae – or unidentified comparable form
- †Dillerlemur
  - †Dillerlemur pagei
  - †Dillerlemur robinettei – type locality for species
- †Dilophodon
  - †Dilophodon destitutus – type locality for species
  - †Dilophodon minusculus
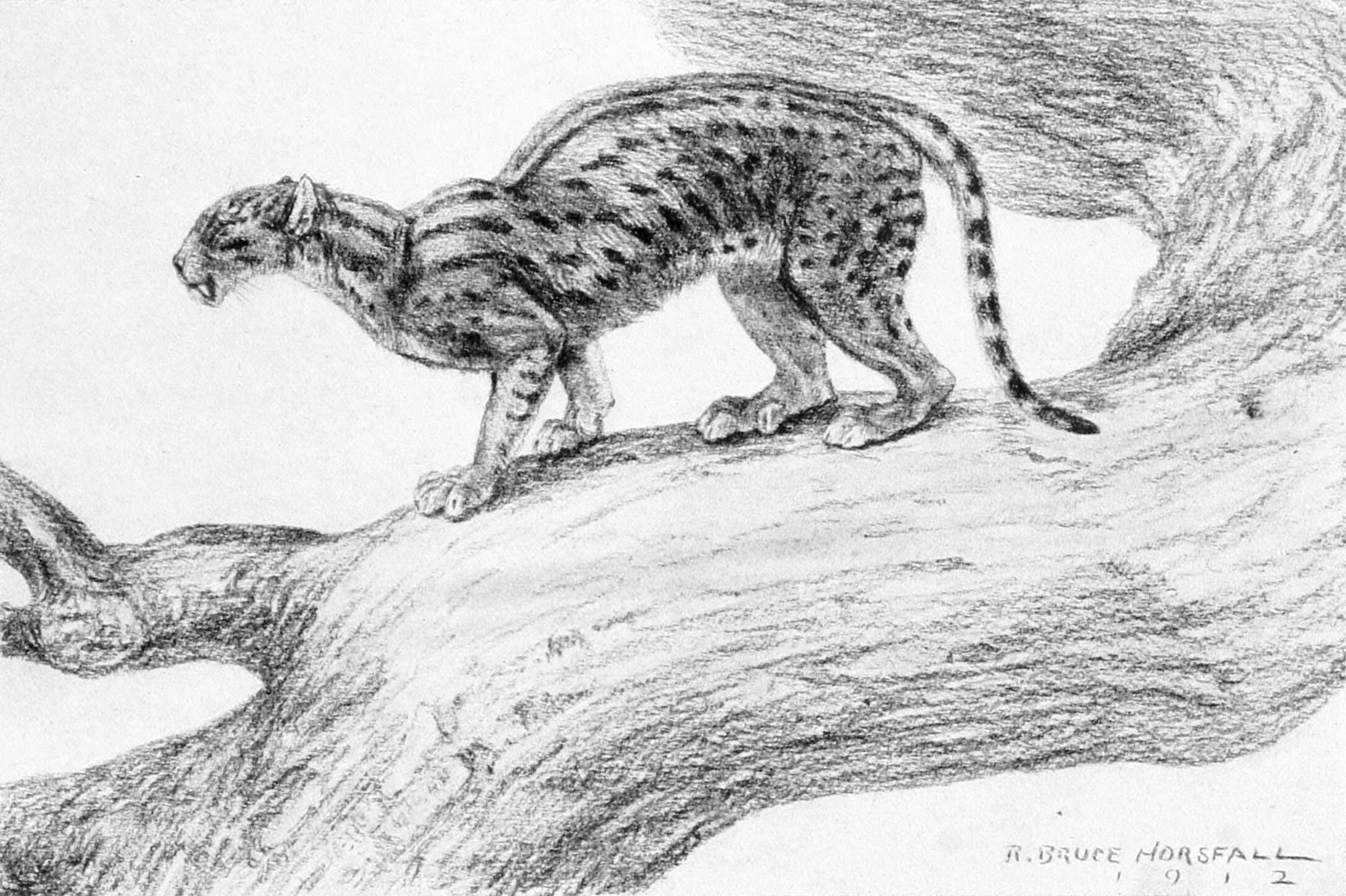
- Life restoration of the Eocene-Miocene false saber-toothed cat Dinictis. Robert Bruce Horsfall (1913).
  †Dinictis
  - †Dinictis felina
- †Dinohyus
- †Diospyros
  - †Diospyros brachysepala
  - †Diospyros haguei
  - †Diospyros lamarensis
- †Dipassalus
  - †Dipassalus oryctes
- †Diplobunops
  - †Diplobunops matthewi
- †Diplocynodon
- †Diplolophus
  - †Diplolophus insolens – type locality for species
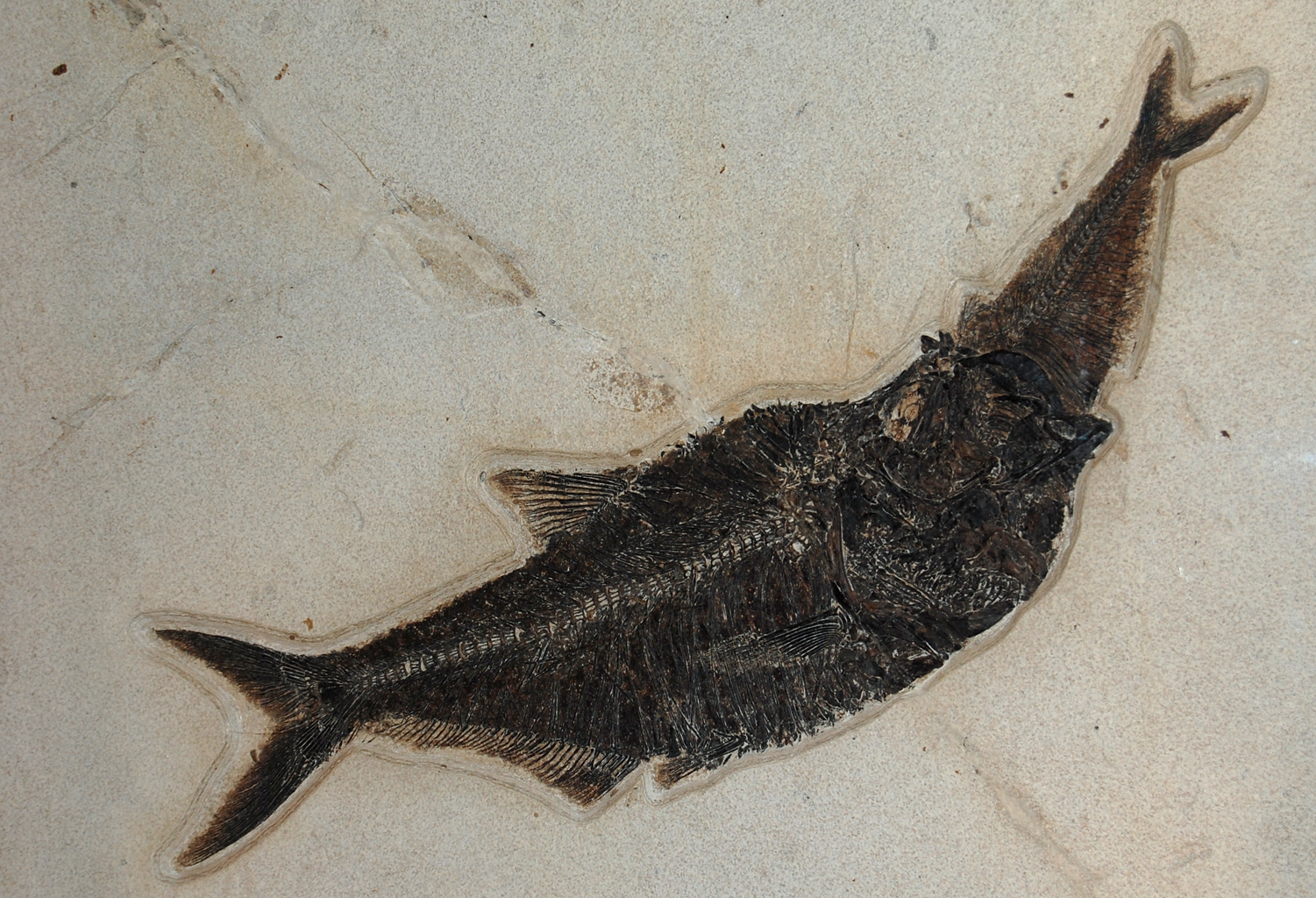
- Fossilized skeleton of the Early Cretaceous-Eocene bony fish Diplomystus preserved in the act of swallowing another fish
  †Diplomystus
  - †Diplomystus dentatus
- †Dipoides
  - †Dipoides stirtoni
- †Dipsalidictis
  - †Dipsalidictis aequidens
  - †Dipsalidictis krausei – type locality for species
  - †Dipsalidictis platypus – type locality for species
  - †Dipsalidictis transiens
- †Dipsalodon
  - †Dipsalodon churchillorum
  - †Dipsalodon matthewi – type locality for species
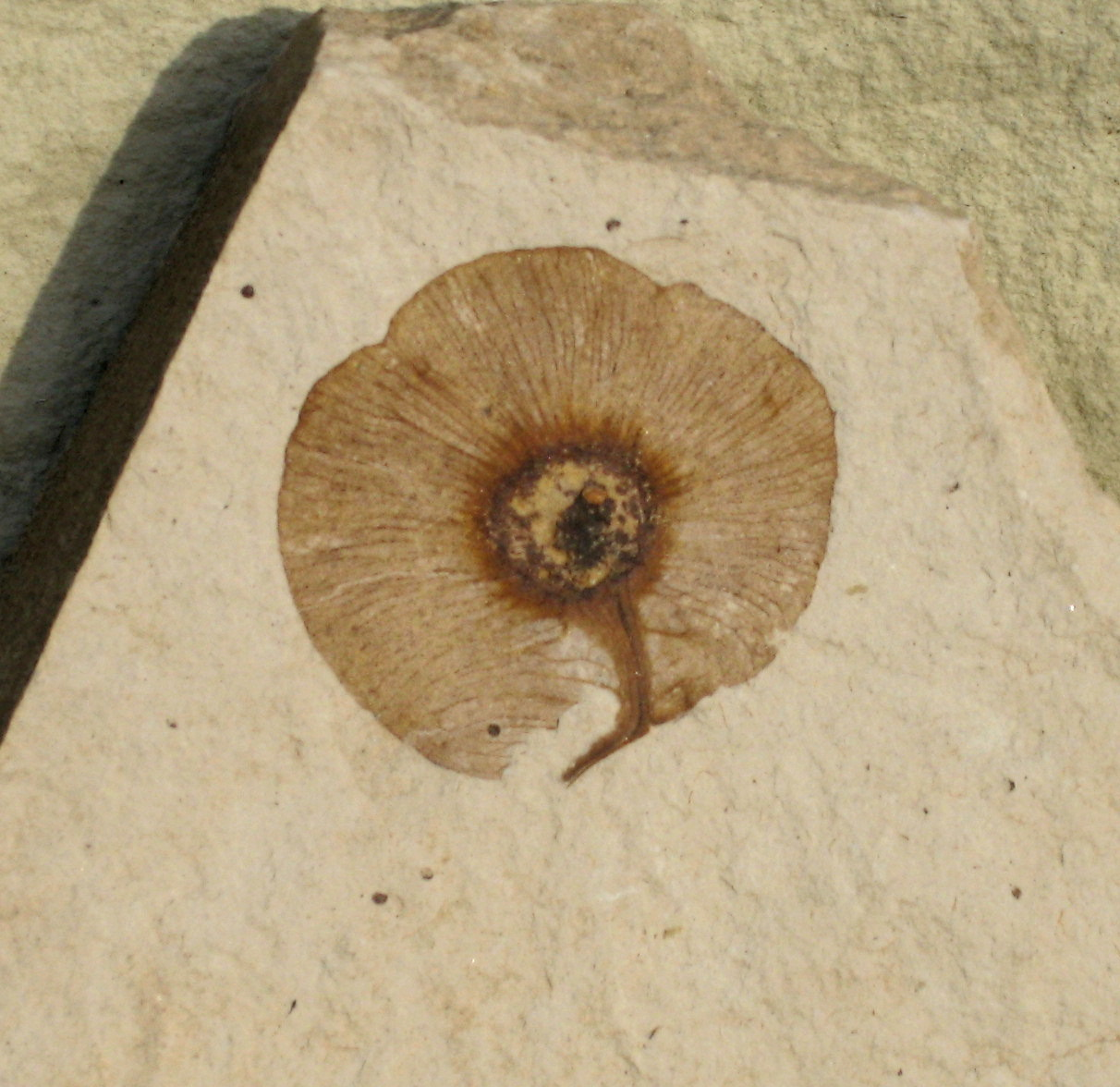
- Fossilized samara of the Eocene-modern Dipteronia tree
  Dipteronia
  - †Dipteronia GR551 informal
  - †Dipteronia insignis
- Discus
- †Dissacus
  - †Dissacus argenteus – type locality for species
  - †Dissacus longaevus
  - †Dissacus navajovius
  - †Dissacus praenuntius
- †Distylium
  - †Distylium eocenica
- †Dithelysia
  - †Dithelysia amorensis
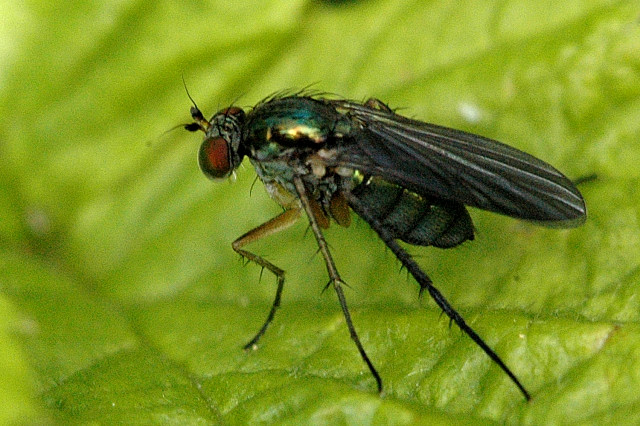
- A living Dolichopus fly
  Dolichopus
- †Dombeya
  - †Dombeya novimundi
- †Domnina
  - †Domnina gradata – or unidentified comparable form
- †Domninoides
  - †Domninoides valentinensis – or unidentified comparable form
- †Dorraletes
  - †Dorraletes diminutivus
- †Douglassciurus
  - †Douglassciurus jeffersoni
- †Drimys
- Dryocoetes
  - †Dryocoetes carbonarius – type locality for species
  - †Dryocoetes impressus
- †Dryomomys – type locality for genus
  - †Dryomomys dulcifer – type locality for species
  - †Dryomomys szalayi – type locality for species
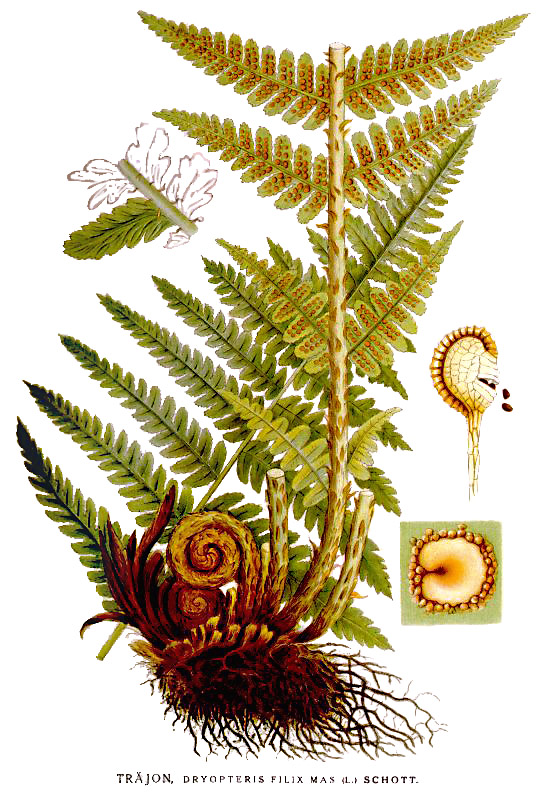
- Illustration of a modern Dryopteris, or wood fern
  Dryopteris
  - †Dryopteris lakesi
  - †Dryopteris longipetiolatum
  - †Dryopteris meeteetseana
  - †Dryopteris serrata
  - †Dryopteris weedii
  - †Dryopteris xantholithensis
- †Dunnophis
  - †Dunnophis microechinis – type locality for species
  - †Dunnophis microechinus
- †Dysagrion – type locality for genus
  - †Dysagrion fredericii – type locality for species
  - †Dysagrion lakesii – type locality for species
  - †Dysagrion packardii – type locality for species

== E ==
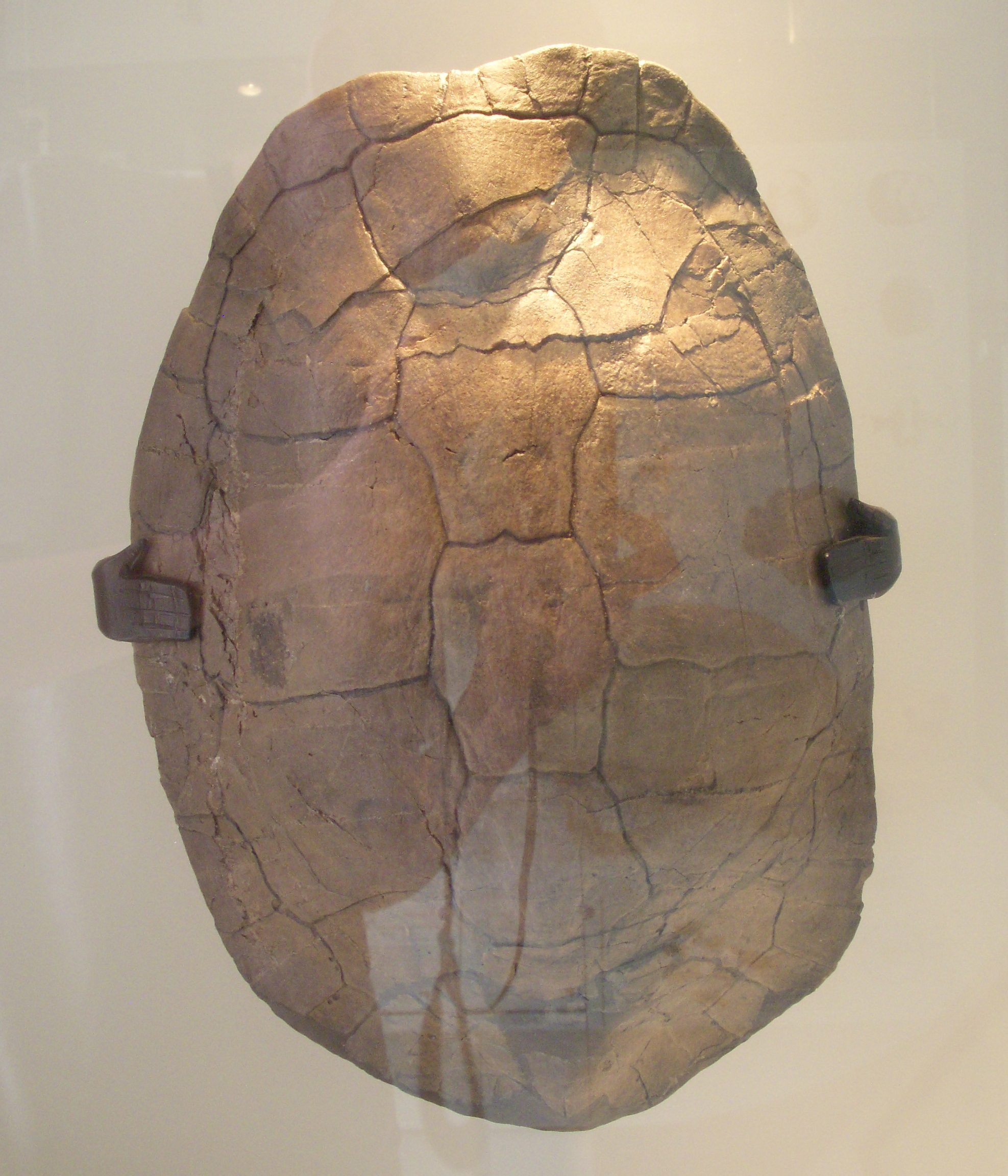
- Fossilized shell of the Eocene turtle Echmatemys
  †Echmatemys
  - †Echmatemys haydeni
  - †Echmatemys lativertebralis
  - †Echmatemys megaulax
  - †Echmatemys rivalis – type locality for species
  - †Echmatemys septaria
  - †Echmatemys testudinea
  - †Echmatemys wyomingensis
- †Eclytus
  - †Eclytus lutatus – type locality for species
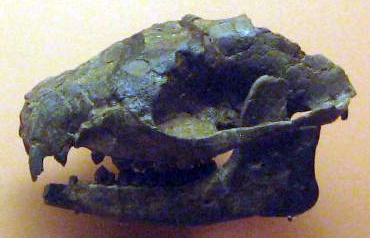
- Fossilized skull of the Paleocene-Eocene mammal Ectocion
  †Ectocion
  - †Ectocion cedrus – type locality for species
  - †Ectocion collinus – type locality for species
  - †Ectocion major – or unidentified comparable form
  - †Ectocion mediotuber – type locality for species
  - †Ectocion osbornianus
  - †Ectocion parvus
  - †Ectocion superstes
- †Ectoconus
  - †Ectoconus cavigellii – type locality for species
  - †Ectoconus ditrigonus
- †Ectoganus
  - †Ectoganus bighornensis
  - †Ectoganus copei
  - †Ectoganus gliriformes
  - †Ectoganus gliriformis
  - †Ectoganus lobdelli
- †Ectopistes
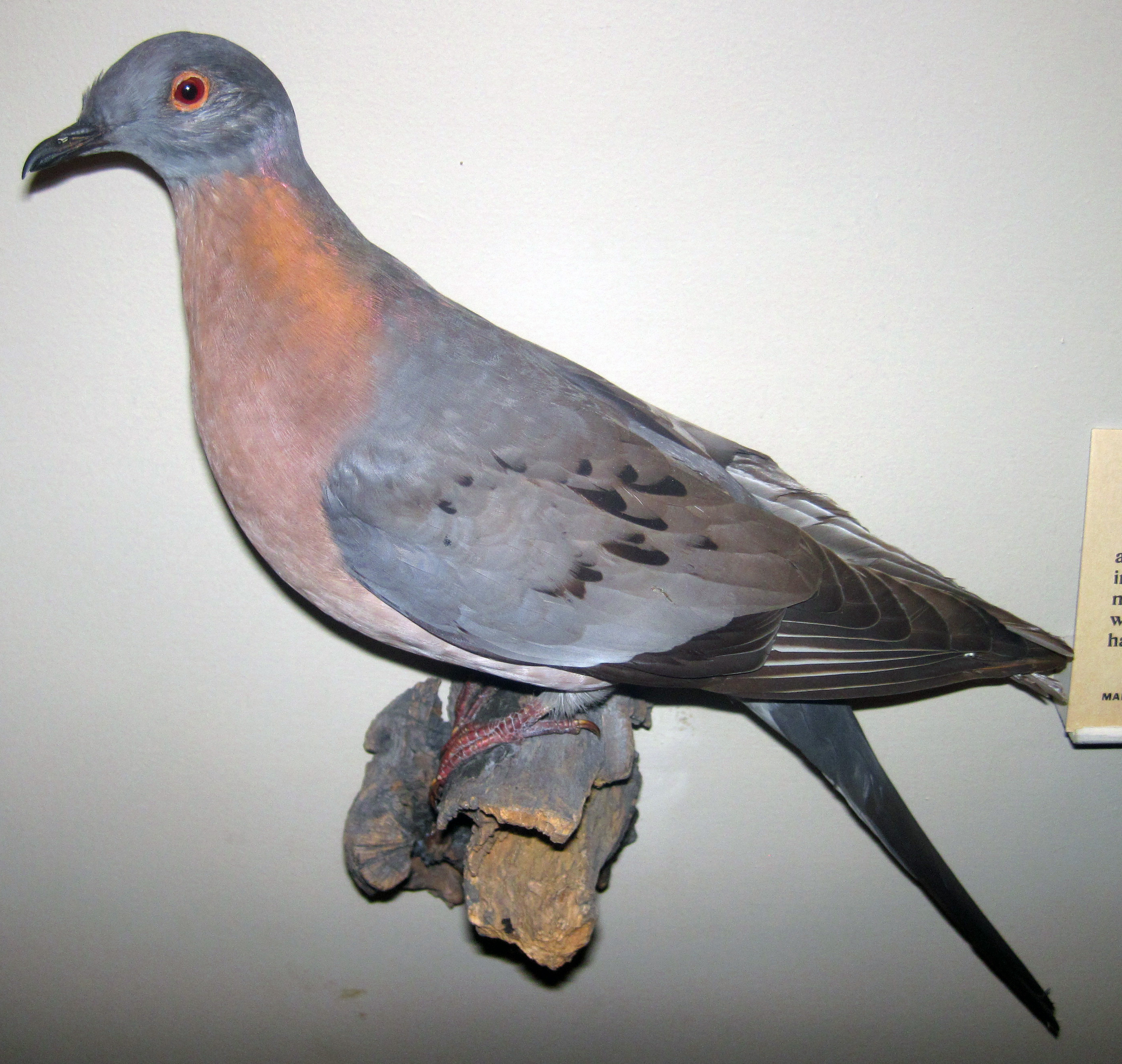
  - Taxidermied male Ectopistes migratorius, or passenger pigeon
    †Ectopistes migratorius
- †Ectopocynus
  - †Ectopocynus antiquus – type locality for species
  - †Ectopocynus intermedius – type locality for species
- †Ectypodus
  - †Ectypodus aphronorus
  - †Ectypodus childei – or unidentified comparable form
  - †Ectypodus hazeni – type locality for species
  - †Ectypodus laytoni – type locality for species
  - †Ectypodus lovei
  - †Ectypodus musculus
  - †Ectypodus powelli – type locality for species
  - †Ectypodus simpsoni
  - †Ectypodus szalayi
  - †Ectypodus tardus
- †Elaeodendron
  - †Elaeodendron polymorphum
- †Ellipsodon
  - †Ellipsodon lemuroides – or unidentified comparable form
- †Elphidotarsius
  - †Elphidotarsius florencae – or unidentified comparable form
  - †Elphidotarsius shotgunensis
- †Elpidophorus
  - †Elpidophorus elegans
  - †Elpidophorus minor – or unidentified comparable form
- †Elwynella – type locality for genus
  - †Elwynella oreas – type locality for species
- †Enhydrocyon
  - †Enhydrocyon basilatus
  - †Enhydrocyon crassidens
  - †Enhydrocyon pahinsintewakpa
- Enochrus
  - †Enochrus primaevus – type locality for species
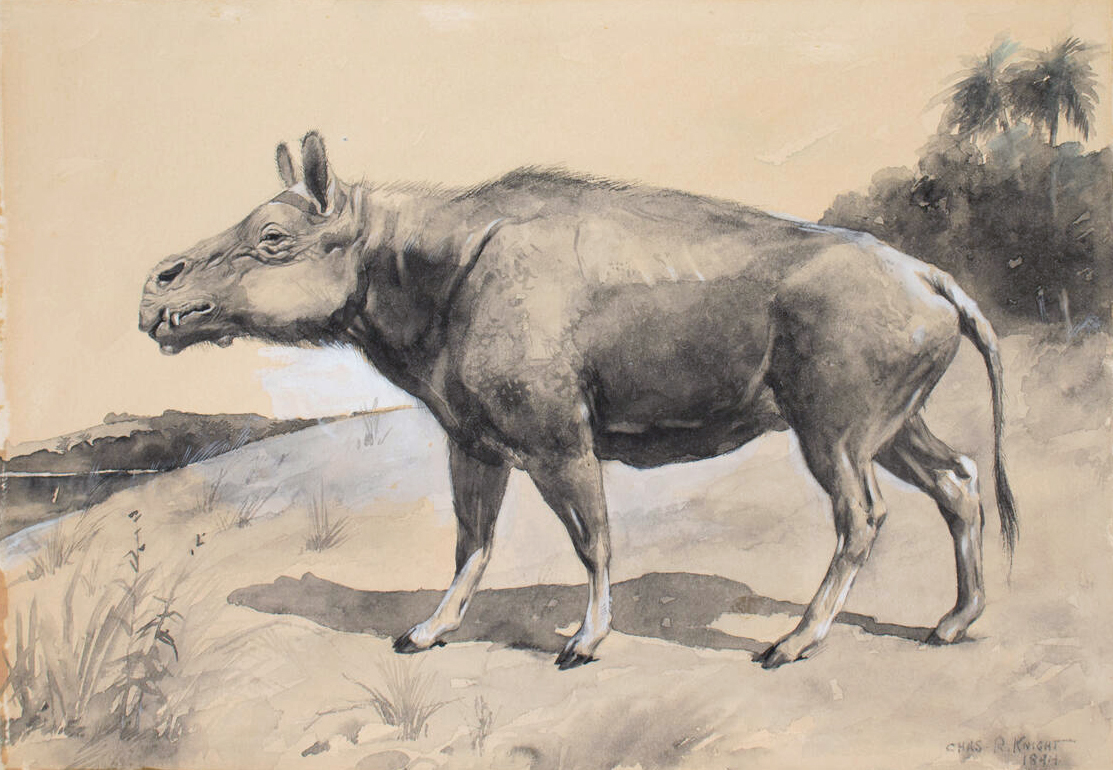
- Life restoration of the Eocene-Oligocene mammal Entelodon. Charles R. Knight.
  †Entelodon
  - †Entelodon coarctatus – or unidentified comparable form
- †Entomolestes – type locality for genus
  - †Entomolestes grangeri – type locality for species
  - †Entomolestes westgatei – type locality for species
- †Entomophontes – type locality for genus
  - †Entomophontes hutchisoni – type locality for species
  - †Entomophontes incrustatus – type locality for species
- †Entoptychus
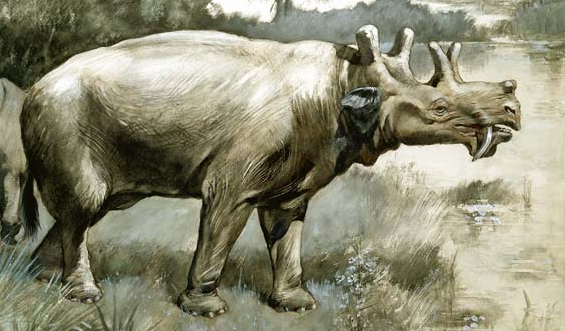
- Life restoration of a pair of the Eocene uintathere mammal Eobasileus. Charles R. Knight (1890s).
  †Eobasileus
  - †Eobasileus cornutus
- †Eobucco
  - †Eobucco brodkorbi
- †Eocalopteryx
  - †Eocalopteryx atavina – type locality for species
- †Eoceornis – type locality for genus
  - †Eoceornis ardetta – type locality for species
- †Eoconodon
  - †Eoconodon copanus
- †Eocrex – type locality for genus
  - †Eocrex primus – type locality for species
- †Eodiploglossus – type locality for genus
  - †Eodiploglossus borealis – type locality for species
- †Eoerianthus
  - †Eoerianthus multispinosa
- †Eoformica
  - †Eoformica pinguis – type locality for species
- †Eofringillirostrum – type locality for genus
  - †Eofringillirostrum boudreauxi – type locality for species
- †Eoglyptosaurus
  - †Eoglyptosaurus donohoei – type locality for species
- Eohiodon
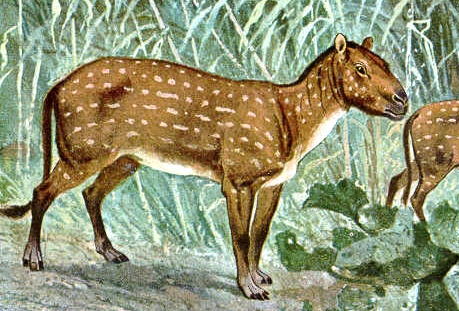
- Life restoration of the Eocene horse Eohippus. Heinrich Harder (1920).
  †Eohippus
  - †Eohippus cristatus
- †Eoictops – type locality for genus
  - †Eoictops novaceki – type locality for species
- †Eoliarus – tentative report
  - †Eoliarus lutensis – type locality for species
- †Eomoropus
  - †Eomoropus amarorum
  - †Eomoropus anarsius
- †Eopodagrion – type locality for genus
  - †Eopodagrion abortivum – type locality for species
  - †Eopodagrion scudderi – type locality for species
- †Eorhinophrynus
  - †Eorhinophrynus septentrionalis – type locality for species
- †Eoryctes – type locality for genus
  - †Eoryctes melanus – type locality for species
- †Eostangeria
  - †Eostangeria pseudopteris
- †Eostrix
  - †Eostrix martinellii – type locality for species
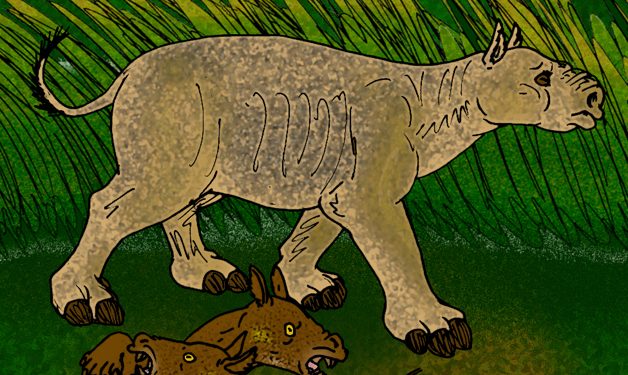
- Life restoration of the Eocene brontothere mammal Eotitanops
  †Eotitanops
  - †Eotitanops borealis
- †Eotylopus
  - †Eotylopus reedi – type locality for species
- †Eozygodactylus – type locality for genus
  - †Eozygodactylus americanus – type locality for species
- †Epicaerus
  - †Epicaerus dilapsus – type locality for species
  - †Epicaerus effossus – type locality for species
  - †Epicaerus exanimis – type locality for species
  - †Epicaerus fodinarum
  - †Epicaerus saxatilis – type locality for species
  - †Epicaerus subterraneus
  - †Epicaerus terrosus – type locality for species
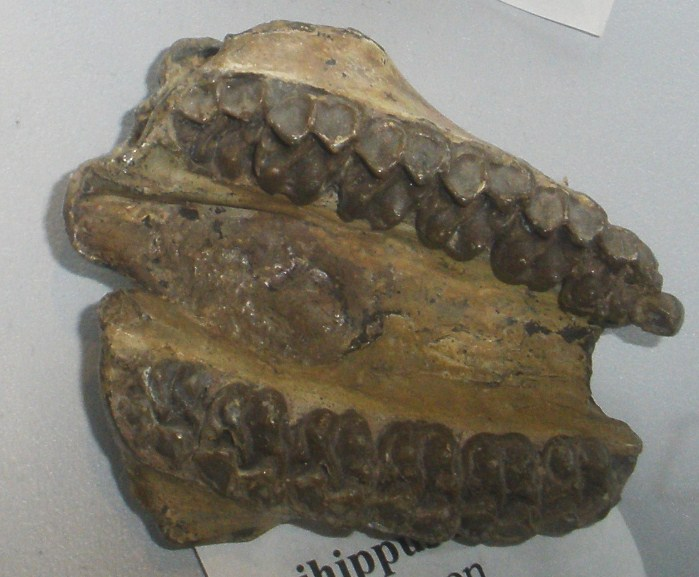
- Underside of the fossilized cranium of the Eocene horse Epihippus
  †Epihippus
  - †Epihippus gracilis
- †Epitriplopus
  - †Epitriplopus uintensis
- †Epoicotherium
  - †Epoicotherium unicum
- †Equisetum
  - †Equisetum canaliculatum
  - †Equisetum deciduum
  - †Equisetum FW21 informal
  - †Equisetum haguei
- Equus
  - †Equus conversidens
- Eremophila
  - †Eremophila alpestris
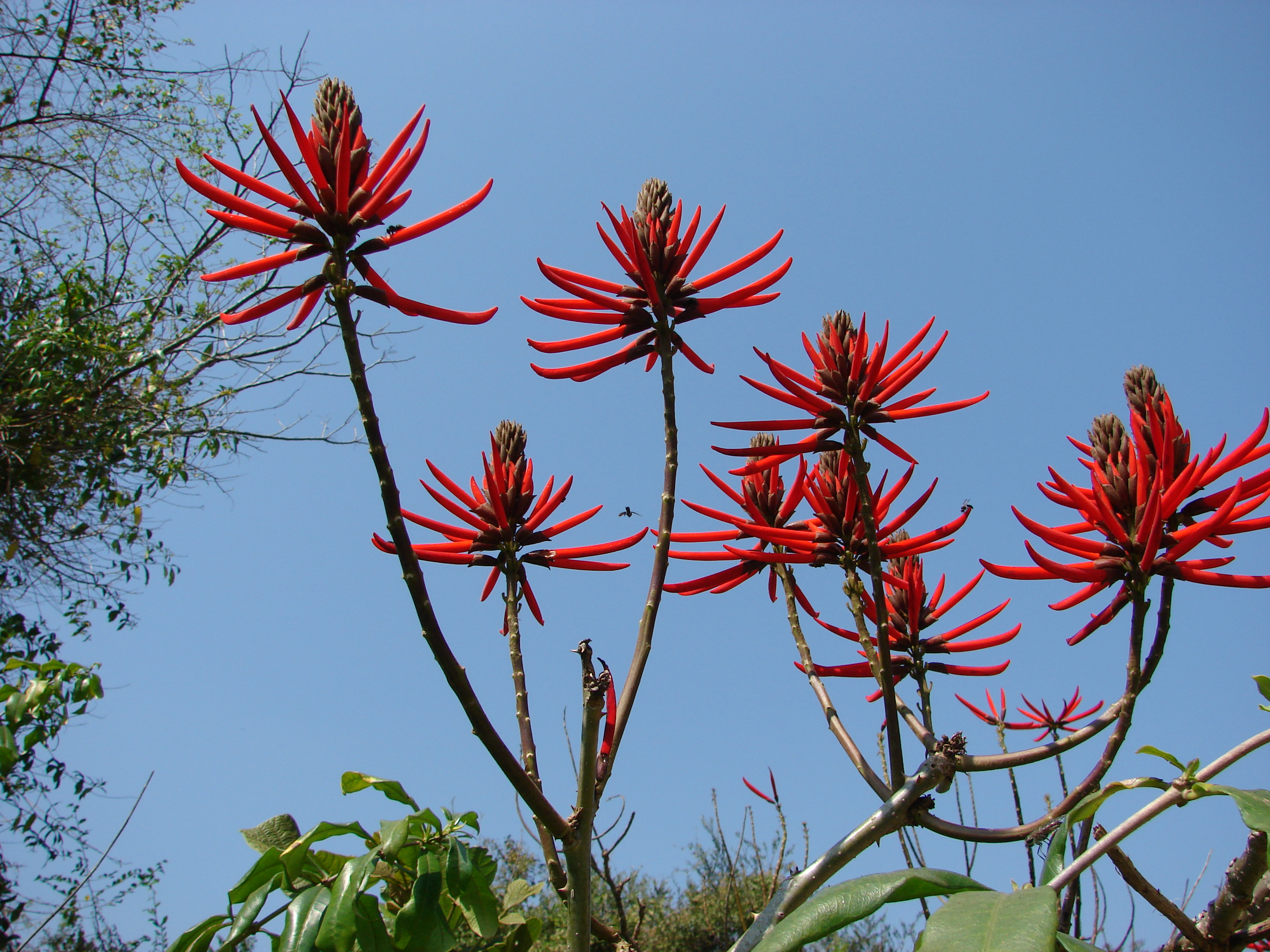
- Erythrina speciosa inflorescences, Brazil
  Erythrina
  - †Erythrina roanensis – type locality for species
- Esox
  - †Esox kronneri – type locality for species
- †Esthonyx
  - †Esthonyx acutidens
  - †Esthonyx bisulcatus
  - †Esthonyx gunnelli
  - †Esthonyx spatularius
- †Eucastor
- †Eucommia
  - †Eucommia serrata
- †Eudaemonema
  - †Eudaemonema cuspidata
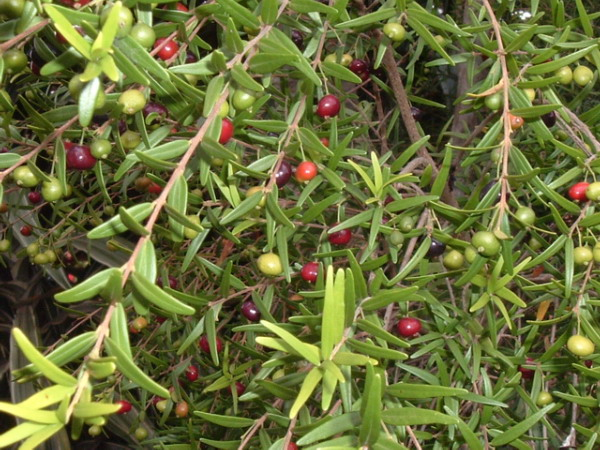
- Branches and fruits of a living Eugenia
  Eugenia
  - †Eugenia americana
- †Eugnamptus
  - †Eugnamptus decemsatus – type locality for species
  - †Eugnamptus grandaevus
- †Euhapsis
  - †Euhapsis ellicottae
- †Eumys
  - †Eumys elegans
- †Euparius
  - †Euparius elusus – type locality for species
  - †Euparius repertus – type locality for species
- Euphagus
  - †Euphagus cyanocephalus
  - †Euphagus magnirostris
- †Euproteaciphyllum
  - †Euproteaciphyllum minutum
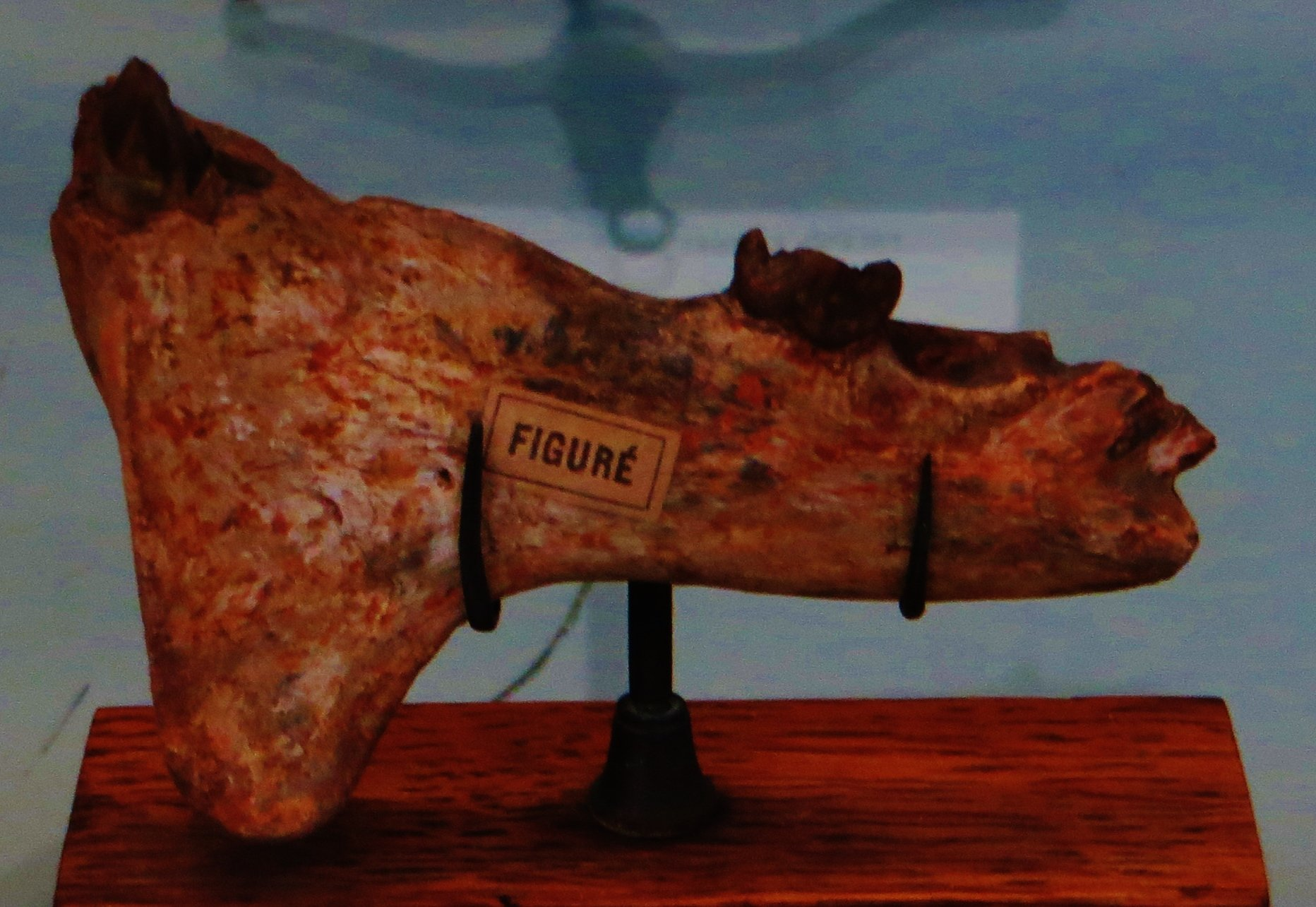
- Fossilized mandible of the Eocene-Oligocene false saber-toothed cat Eusmilus
  †Eusmilus
  - †Eusmilus sicarius
- Eutamias
- †Eutypomys
  - †Eutypomys parvus
- †Exostinus
  - †Exostinus lancensis – or unidentified comparable form

== F ==
- Fagus
  - †Fagus antipofii
  - †Fagus undulata
- Falco
  - †Falco columbarius
  - †Falco falconella – type locality for species
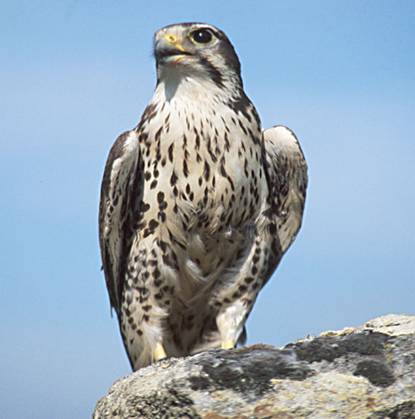
  - A living Falco mexicanus, or prairie falcon
    †Falco mexicanus
  - †Falco rusticolus
  - †Falco sparverius
- †Ficarasites – type locality for genus
  - †Ficarasites stigmaticum – type locality for species
- Ficus
  - †Ficus affinis
  - †Ficus artocarpoides
  - †Ficus asiminaefolia
  - †Ficus deformata
  - †Ficus densifolia
  - †Ficus haguei
  - †Ficus planicostata
  - †Ficus shastensis – tentative report
  - †Ficus subtruncata
  - †Ficus tiliaefolia – tentative report
  - †Ficus ungeri
- †Firmianites – type locality for genus
  - †Firmianites aterrimus – type locality for species
- †Florentiamys
  - †Florentiamys kinseyi – type locality for species
  - †Florentiamys loomisi – type locality for species
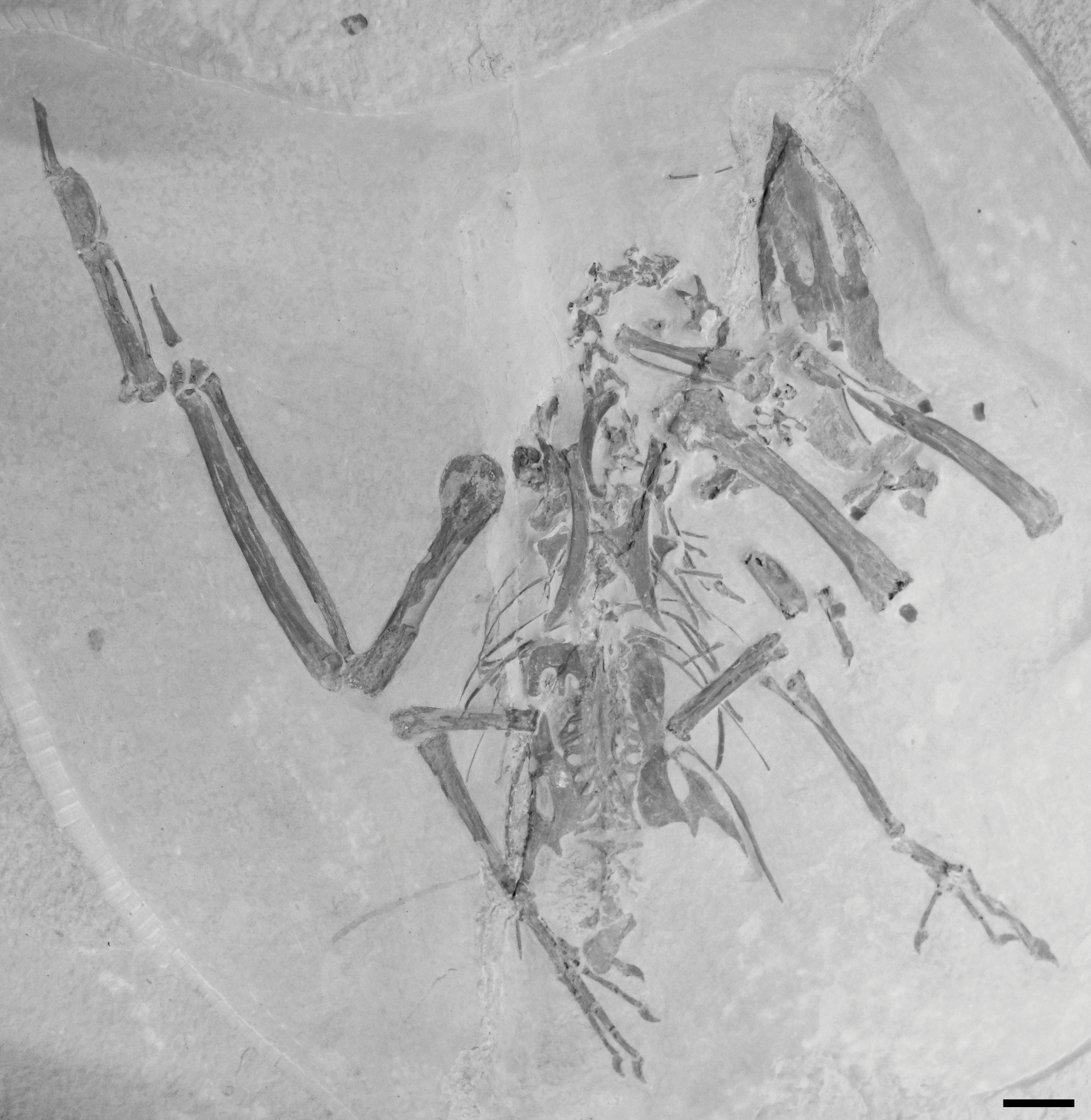
- Fossilized skeleton of the Eocene bird Fluvioviridavis
  †Fluvioviridavis – type locality for genus
  - †Fluvioviridavis platyrhamphus – type locality for species
- †Foekenia
  - †Foekenia catenulata
- †Fortuna
  - †Fortuna marsilioides – or unidentified comparable form
- †Franimys
  - †Franimys ambos
  - †Franimys amherstensis – type locality for species
  - †Franimys buccatus
- †Fraxinoipollenis
  - †Fraxinoipollenis variabilis
- †Fraxinoipollenites
  - †Fraxinoipollenites pachyexinous
  - †Fraxinoipollenites variabilis
- †Fraxinopollenites
  - †Fraxinopollenites variabilis
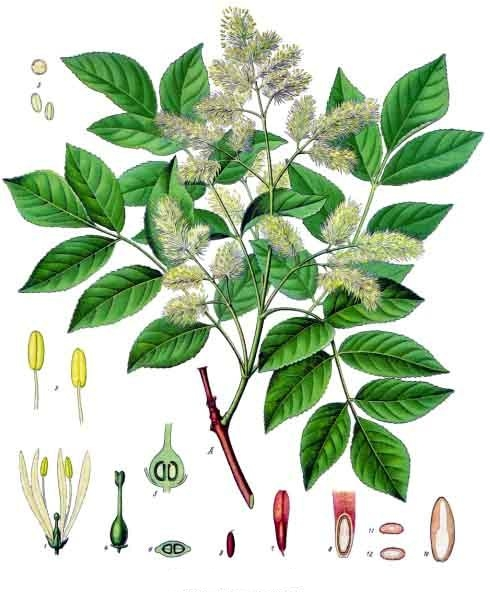
- Illustrations of the flowers and foliage of a living Fraxinus, or ash tree, with insets further detailing its anatomy
  †Fraxinus
  - †Fraxinus eocenica
  - †Fraxinus eocinica
  - †Fraxinus wrightii
- †Fulgora
  - †Fulgora granulosa – type locality for species
  - †Fulgora populata – type locality for species

== G ==
- †Gagadon
  - †Gagadon minimonstrum
- †Galbreathia
  - †Galbreathia novellus
- †Galecyon
  - †Galecyon mordax
- Galerita
  - †Galerita marshii – type locality for species
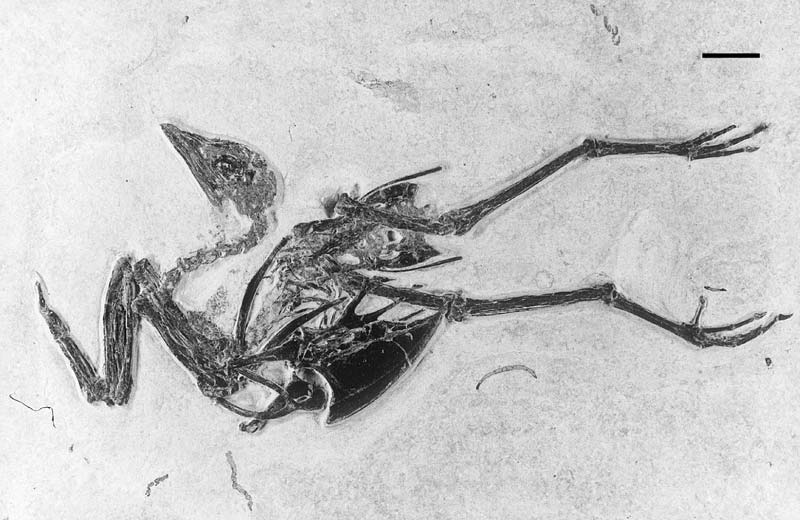
- Fossilized skeleton of the Eocene bird Gallinuloides
  †Gallinuloides – type locality for genus
  - †Gallinuloides wyomingensis – type locality for species
- Gastrocopta
- Gastrodonta
- †Gaultia – type locality for genus
  - †Gaultia silvaticus – type locality for species
- †Gazinius
  - †Gazinius amplus
  - †Gazinius bowni – type locality for species
- †Gazinocyon
  - †Gazinocyon vulpeculus
- †Gelastops
  - †Gelastops joni – type locality for species
  - †Gelastops parcus
- †Geranoides – type locality for genus
  - †Geranoides jepseni – type locality for species
- †Geringophis
  - †Geringophis depressus
- Gerrhonotus – or unidentified comparable form
- Ginkgo
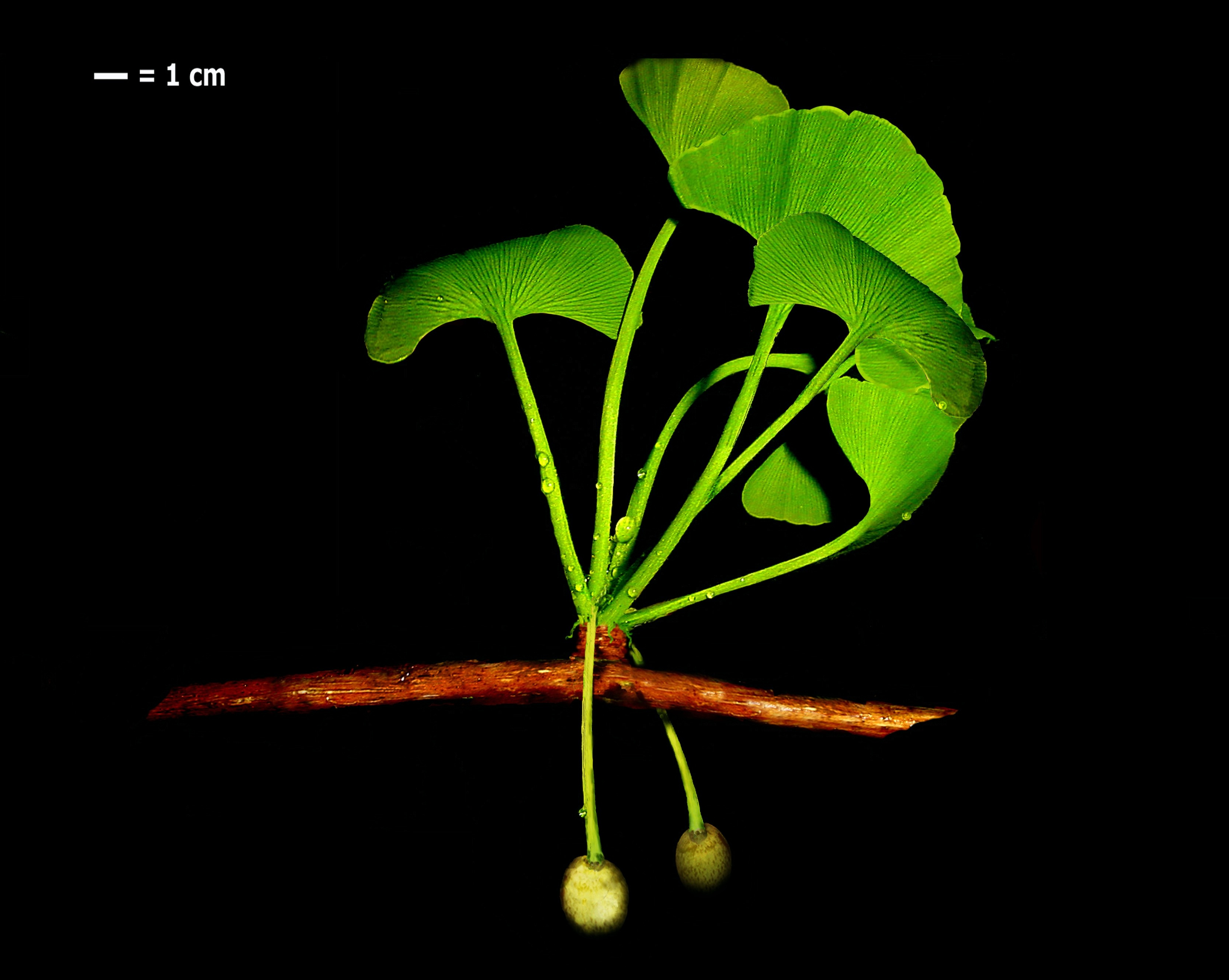
  - Restored foliage of the Late Cretaceous-Miocene ginkgo tree Ginkgo adiantoides
    †Ginkgo adiantoides
- †Gleditsia – or unidentified related form
  - †Gleditsia RR29 informal
- †Gleicheniidites
- †Glypta
  - †Glypta transversalis – type locality for species
- †Glyptosaurus – type locality for genus
  - †Glyptosaurus agmodon – type locality for species
  - †Glyptosaurus obtusidens – type locality for species
  - †Glyptosaurus rhodinos – type locality for species
  - †Glyptosaurus sphenodon – type locality for species
  - †Glyptosaurus sylvestris – type locality for species
- Glyptostrobus
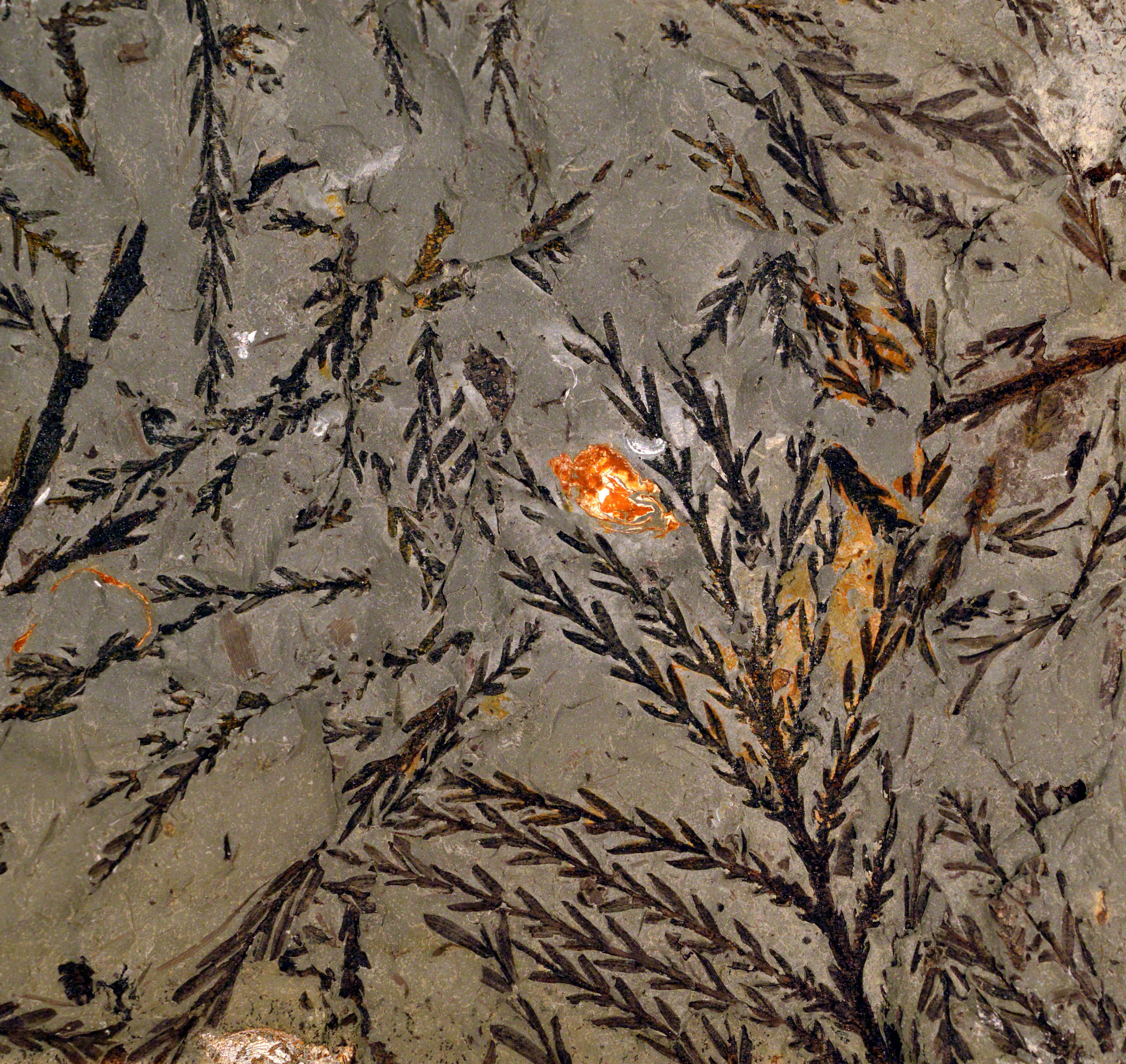
  - Fossilized foliage of the Early Cretaceous-Pleistocene conifer Glyptostrobus europaeus
    †Glyptostrobus europaeus
  - †Glyptostrobus nordenskioldi
- †Goinophis – tentative report
- †Gomphochelys – type locality for genus
  - †Gomphochelys nanus – type locality for species
- †Goniacodon
  - †Goniacodon levisanus – type locality for species
- †Goniodontomys
  - †Goniodontomys disjunctus
- Gopherus
  - †Gopherus laticuneus
- †Gracilocyon
  - †Gracilocyon rosei
  - †Gracilocyon winkleri
- †Grangerella
- †Gregorymys
  - †Gregorymys formosus
  - †Gregorymys riggsi – type locality for species
- †Grewiopsis – tentative report
  - †Grewiopsis aldersoni
- †Griphomys
- Grus
  - †Grus canadensis
  - †Grus marshi – type locality for species
- Gulo
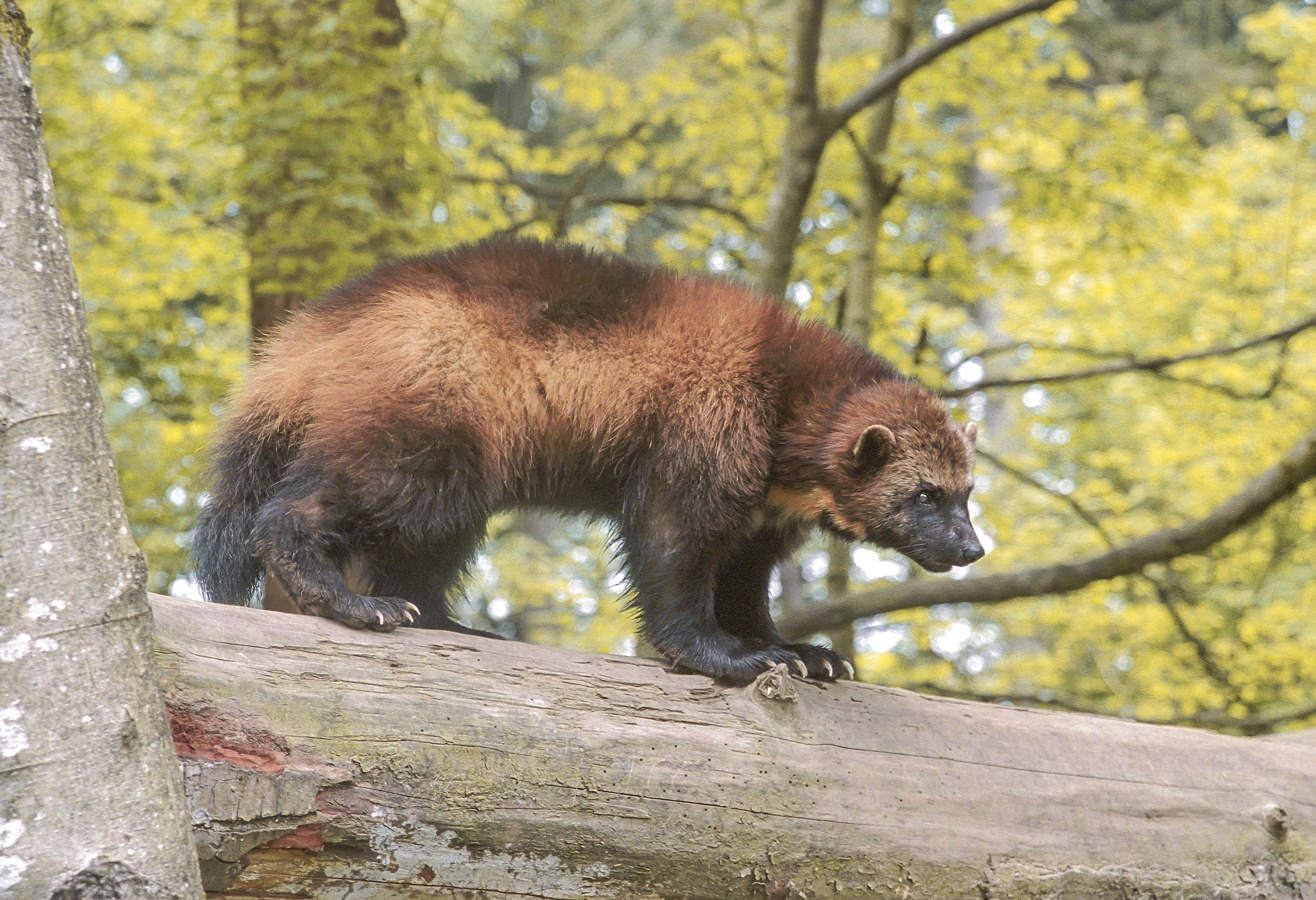
  - A living Gulo gulo, or wolverine
    †Gulo gulo
- †Gymnetron
  - †Gymnetron lecontei – type locality for species
- †Gymnocladus
  - †Gymnocladus hesperia
- Gyraulus – or unidentified comparable form

== H ==
- †Habrosaurus
  - †Habrosaurus dilatus
- †Hadrianus
  - †Hadrianus allabiatus – type locality for species
  - †Hadrianus quadratus – type locality for species
- †Hammapteryx – type locality for genus
  - †Hammapteryx reticulata – type locality for species
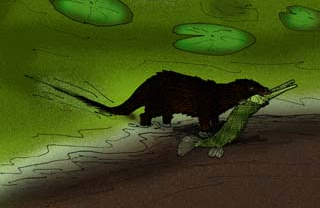
- Restoration of the Paleocene-Eocene mesonychian mammal Hapalodectes
  †Hapalodectes
  - †Hapalodectes anthracinus
  - †Hapalodectes leptognathus
- †Hapalorestes
  - †Hapalorestes lovei – type locality for species
- †Haplaletes
  - †Haplaletes disceptatrix
  - †Haplaletes pelicatus – type locality for species
- †Haploconus
- †Haplodontosaurus
  - †Haplodontosaurus excedens
- †Haplolambda
  - †Haplolambda quinni
- †Haplomylus
  - †Haplomylus bozemanensis – type locality for species
  - †Haplomylus palustris
  - †Haplomylus scottianus – type locality for species
  - †Haplomylus simpsoni
  - †Haplomylus speirianus
  - †Haplomylus zalmouti
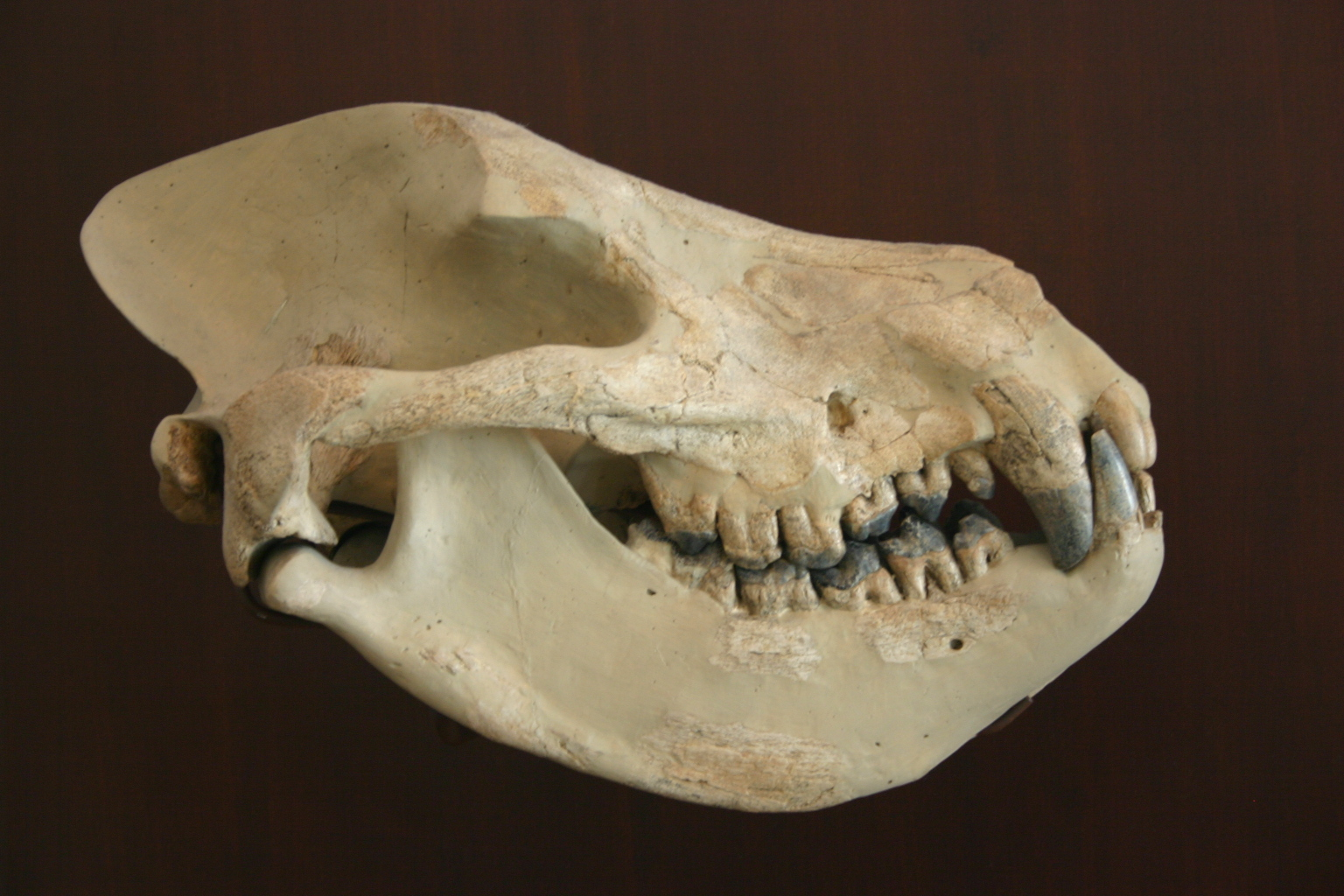
- Fossilized skull of the mesonychian mammal Harpagolestes
  †Harpagolestes
  - †Harpagolestes macrocephalus – type locality for species
- †Harpalodon
  - †Harpalodon sylvestris – or unidentified comparable form
- †Harrymys
  - †Harrymys irvini
  - †Harrymys woodi
- †Helaletes – type locality for genus
  - †Helaletes nanus – type locality for species
- †Heliscomys
  - †Heliscomys hatcheri
  - †Heliscomys mcgrewi
  - †Heliscomys ostranderi
  - †Heliscomys vetus – or unidentified comparable form
- †Helix
  - †Helix evanstonensis
  - †Helix sinclairi
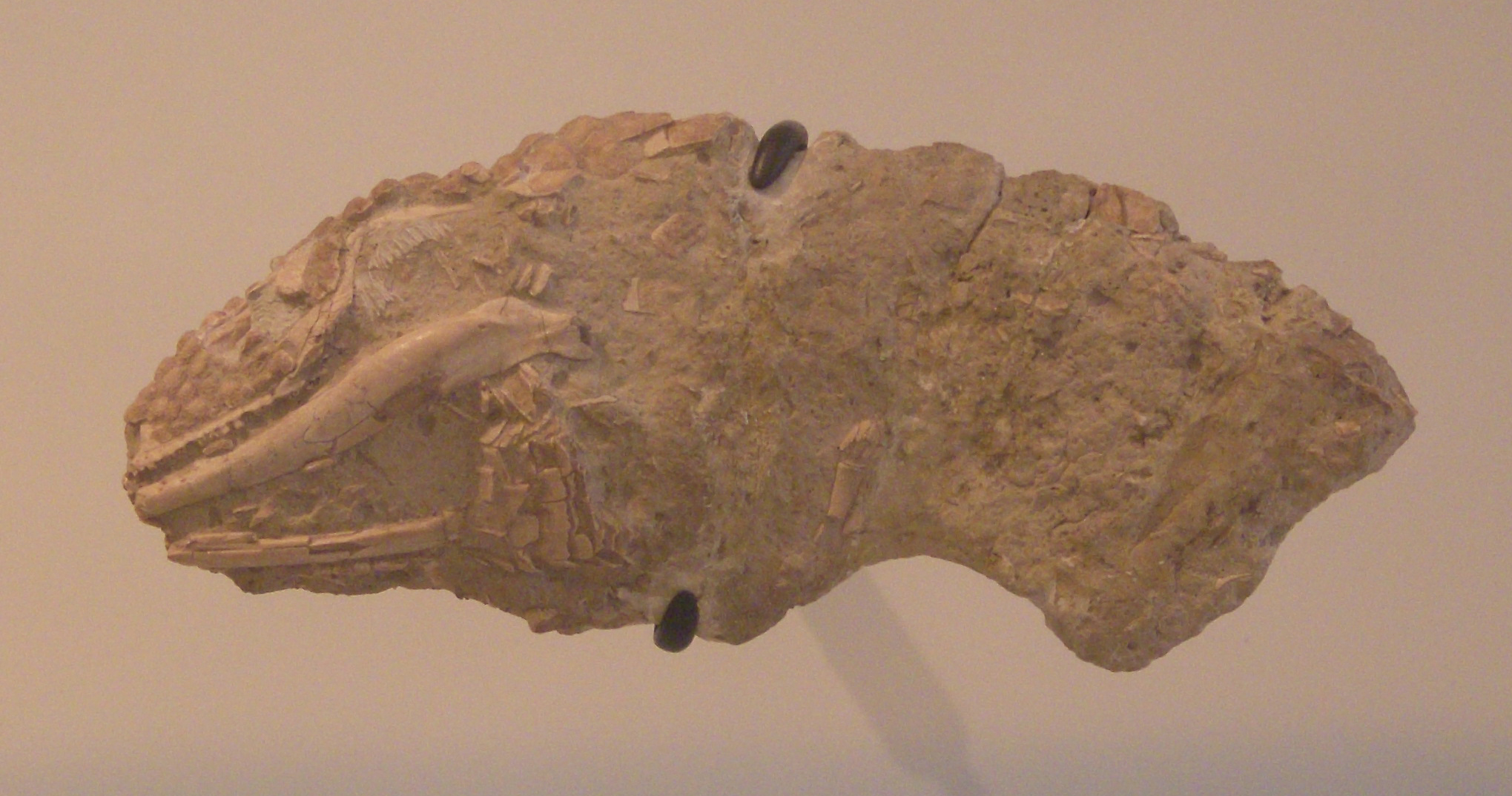
- Fossilized skull of the Oligocene lizard Helodermoides
  †Helodermoides
  - †Helodermoides tuberculatus
- †Helohyus
  - †Helohyus lentus
  - †Helohyus milleri – type locality for species
  - †Helohyus plicodon – type locality for species
- †Hemiacodon
  - †Hemiacodon casamissus – type locality for species
  - †Hemiacodon engardae – type locality for species
  - †Hemiacodon gracilis
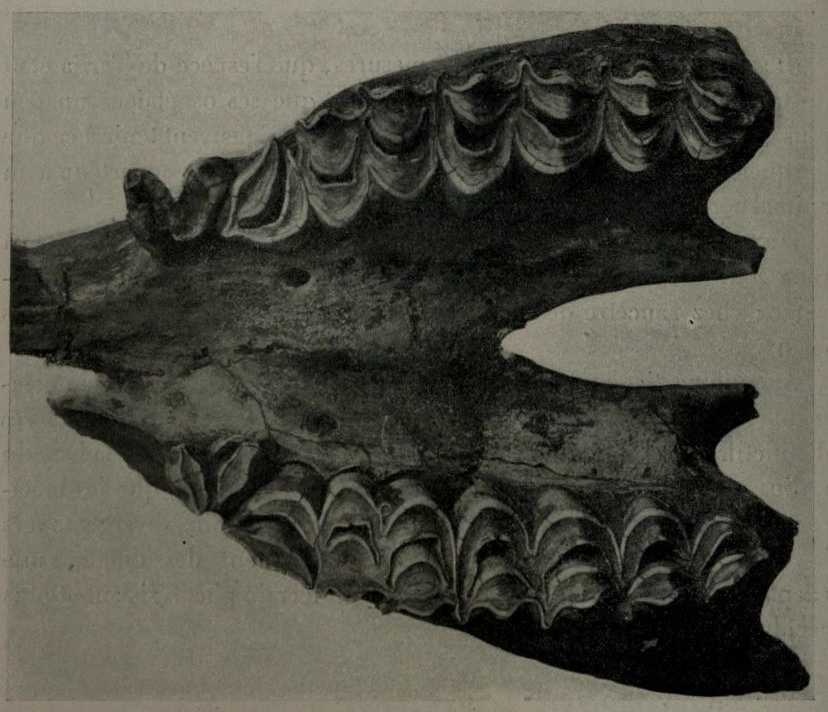
- Fossilized lower jaw of the Miocene-Pleistocene llama relative Hemiauchenia
  †Hemiauchenia
- †Hemipsalodon
  - †Hemipsalodon grandis
- Hemitelia
  - †Hemitelia magna
- †Hemithlaeus
  - †Hemithlaeus harbourae
  - †Hemithlaeus josephi
- †Hendryomeryx
  - †Hendryomeryx wilsoni
- †Heptacodon
- †Heptodon
  - †Heptodon calciculus
  - †Heptodon posticus
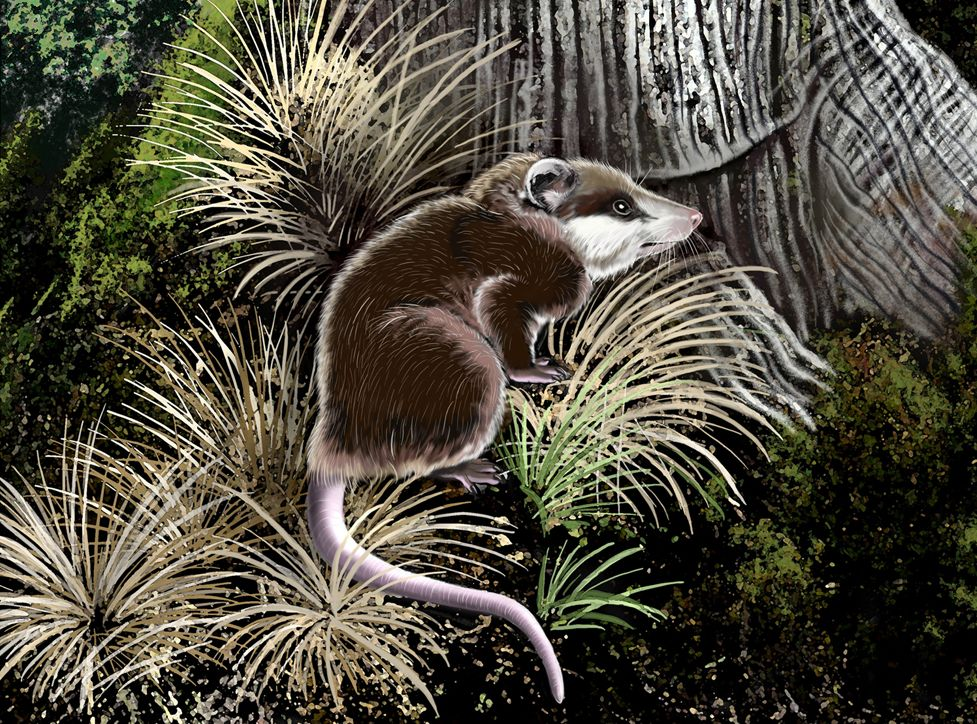
- Life restoration of the Eocene-Miocene mammal Herpetotherium
  †Herpetotherium
  - †Herpetotherium innominatum – type locality for species
  - †Herpetotherium knighti
  - †Herpetotherium youngi – or unidentified comparable form
- †Hesperocyon
  - †Hesperocyon gregarius
- †Hesperopetes
  - †Hesperopetes thoringtoni – type locality for species
- †Hesperosorex
  - †Hesperosorex lovei – type locality for species
- †Heteraletes
  - †Heteraletes leotanus
- †Hexacodus
  - †Hexacodus pelodes
  - †Hexacodus uintensis
- †Hicoria
  - †Hicoria antiqua
  - †Hicoria crescentia
  - †Hicoria culveri
- Hirundo – or unidentified comparable form
  - †Hirundo pyrrhonota
- †Holospira
- †Homacodon
  - †Homacodon vagans – type locality for species
- †Homalota
  - †Homalota recisa – type locality for species
- †Homogalax
  - †Homogalax protapirinus
- †Honrovits – type locality for genus
  - †Honrovits tsuwape – type locality for species
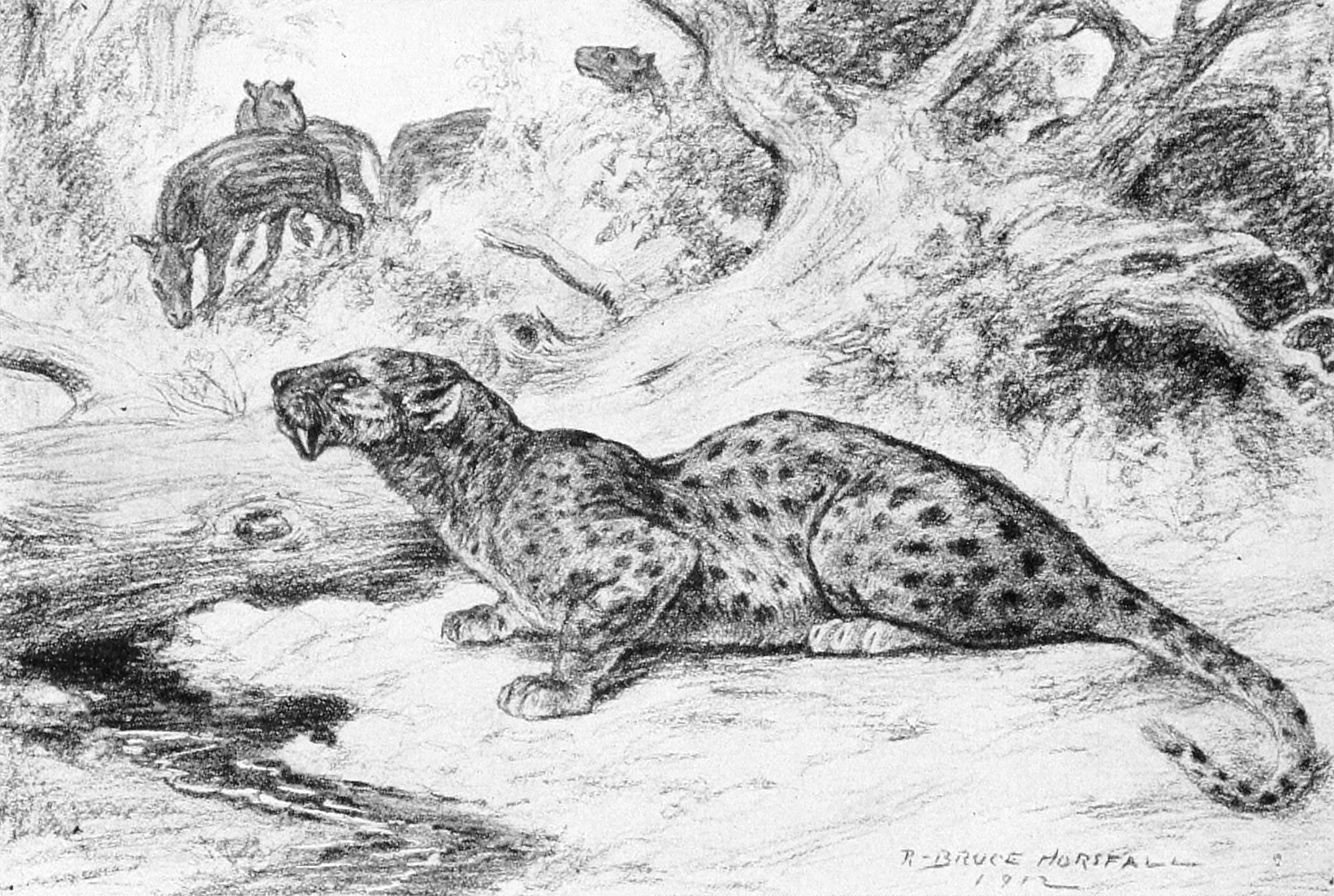
- Life restoration of the Eocene-Oligocene false saber-toothed cat Hoplophoneus. Robert Bruce Horsfall (1913).
  †Hoplophoneus
  - †Hoplophoneus mentalis
  - †Hoplophoneus primaevus
- †Hovenia
  - †Hovenia oregonensis – or unidentified comparable form
- †Huerfanodon
  - †Huerfanodon polecatensis – type locality for species
- †Hummelichelys
  - †Hummelichelys annae – type locality for species
  - †Hummelichelys ellipticus
  - †Hummelichelys grangeri – type locality for species
  - †Hummelichelys guttatus – type locality for species
- †Hutchemys
  - †Hutchemys rememdium
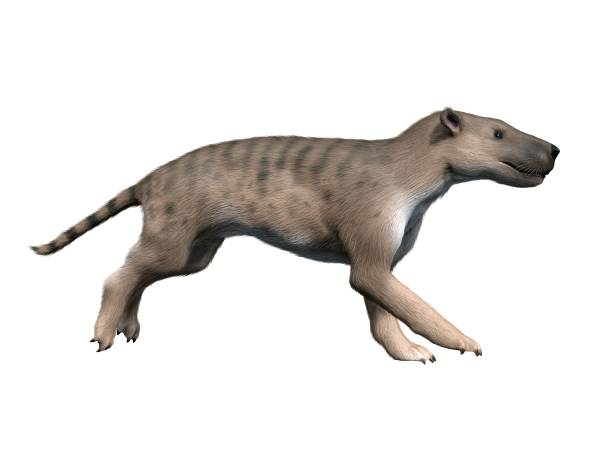
- Life restoration of the Eocene-Miocene creodont mammal Hyaenodon
  †Hyaenodon
  - †Hyaenodon crucians
  - †Hyaenodon horridus
  - †Hyaenodon megaloides
  - †Hyaenodon montanus
  - †Hyaenodon mustelinus
  - †Hyaenodon venturae
  - †Hyaenodon vetus
- Hydrangea
  - †Hydrangea antica
  - †Hydrangea GR537 informal
- Hydrobia – report made of unidentified related form or using admittedly obsolete nomenclature
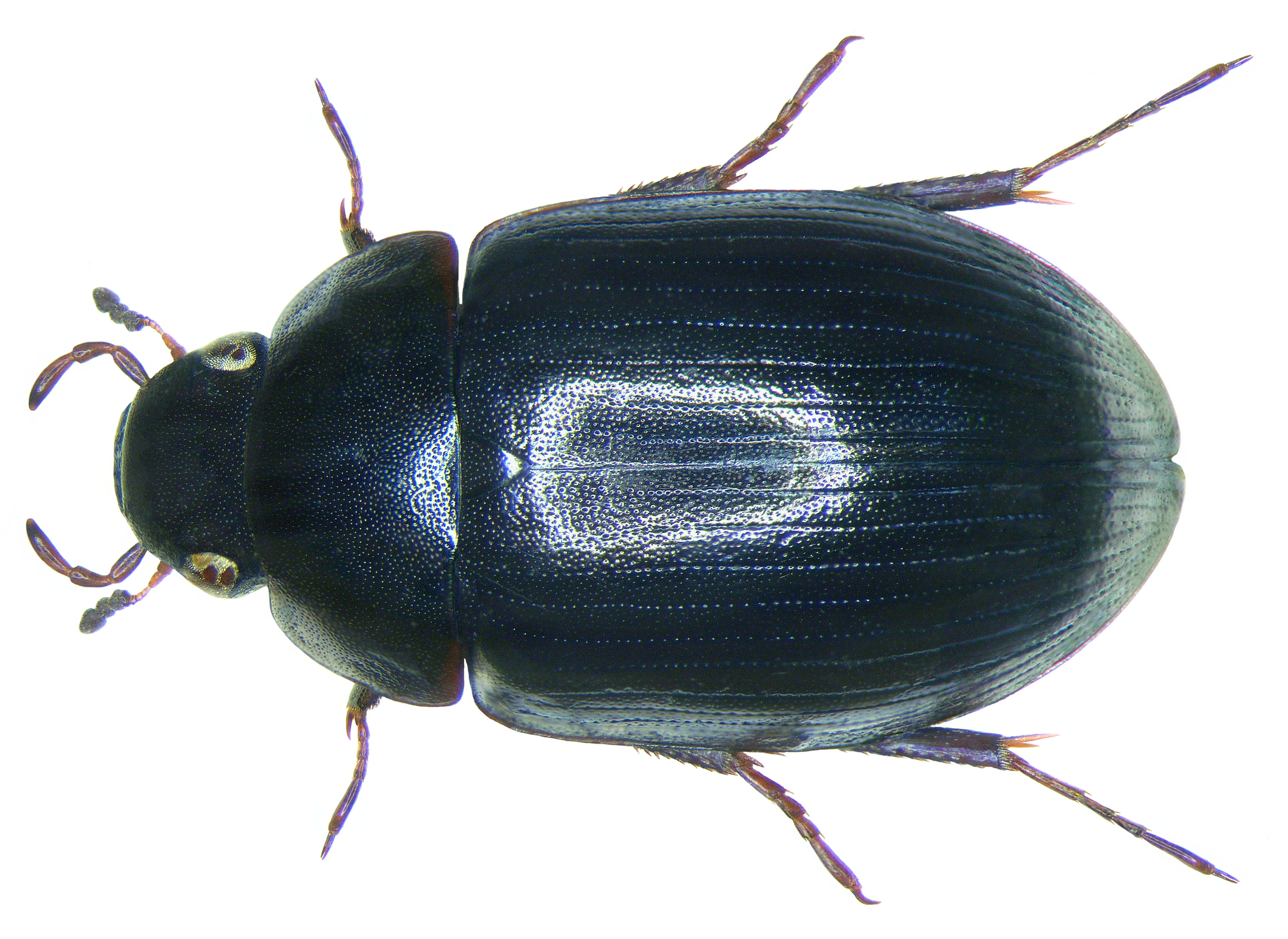
- A living Hydrobius water scavenger beetle
  Hydrobius
  - †Hydrobius confixus – type locality for species
  - †Hydrobius decineratus – type locality for species
- †Hydrochus
  - †Hydrochus relictus – type locality for species
- †Hydromystria
  - †Hydromystria expansa
- †Hylobius
  - †Hylobius packardii – type locality for species
  - †Hylobius provectus – type locality for species
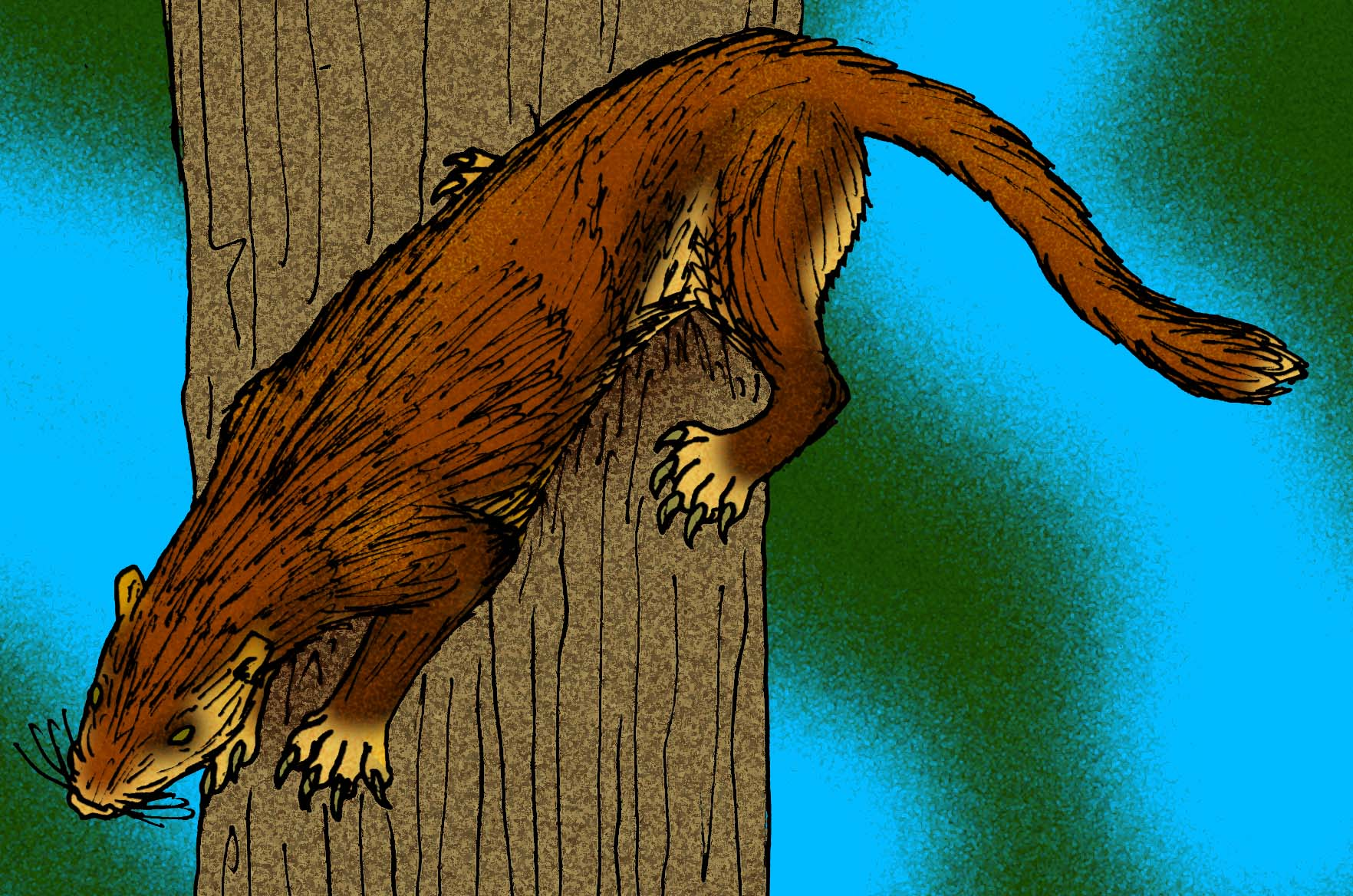
- Life restoration of the Eocene odd-toed ungulate Hyopsodus
  †Hyopsodus
  - †Hyopsodus aemulor
  - †Hyopsodus latidens
  - †Hyopsodus lepidus – type locality for species
  - †Hyopsodus loomisi
  - †Hyopsodus lysitensis
  - †Hyopsodus mentalis
  - †Hyopsodus minor
  - †Hyopsodus minusculus – type locality for species
  - †Hyopsodus miticulus
  - †Hyopsodus paulus – type locality for species
  - †Hyopsodus pauxillus – type locality for species
  - †Hyopsodus powellianus
  - †Hyopsodus simplex
  - †Hyopsodus tonksi – type locality for species
  - †Hyopsodus uintensis
  - †Hyopsodus walcottianus
  - †Hyopsodus wortmani
- †Hypertragulus
  - †Hypertragulus calcaratus
- †Hypisodus
  - †Hypisodus alacer
  - †Hypisodus minimus
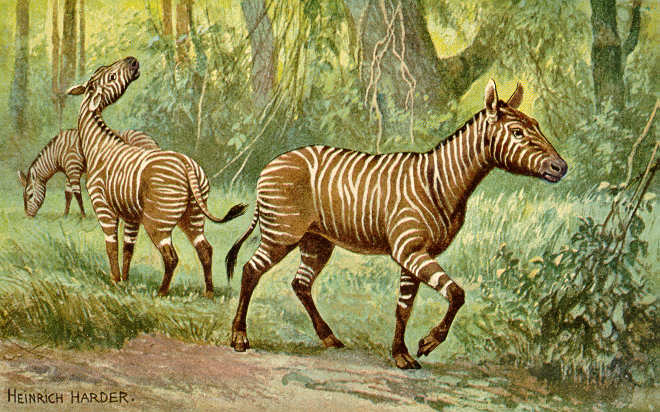
- Life restoration of the Miocene horse Hypohippus. Heinrich Harder (1920).
  †Hypohippus
  - †Hypohippus affinis
- †Hypolagus
  - †Hypolagus parviplicatus – or unidentified comparable form
- †Hyporhina
  - †Hyporhina tertia
- †Hypsiops
  - †Hypsiops breviceps
- †Hyrachyus
  - †Hyrachyus eximius
  - †Hyrachyus modestus – type locality for species
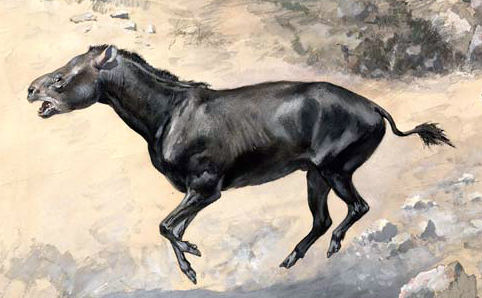
- Life restoration of the Eocene-Oligocene odd-toed ungulate Hyracodon. Charles R. Knight (1896).
  †Hyracodon
  - †Hyracodon nebraskensis
  - †Hyracodon petersoni
  - †Hyracodon priscidens
- †Hyracotherium
  - †Hyracotherium vasacciense

== I ==
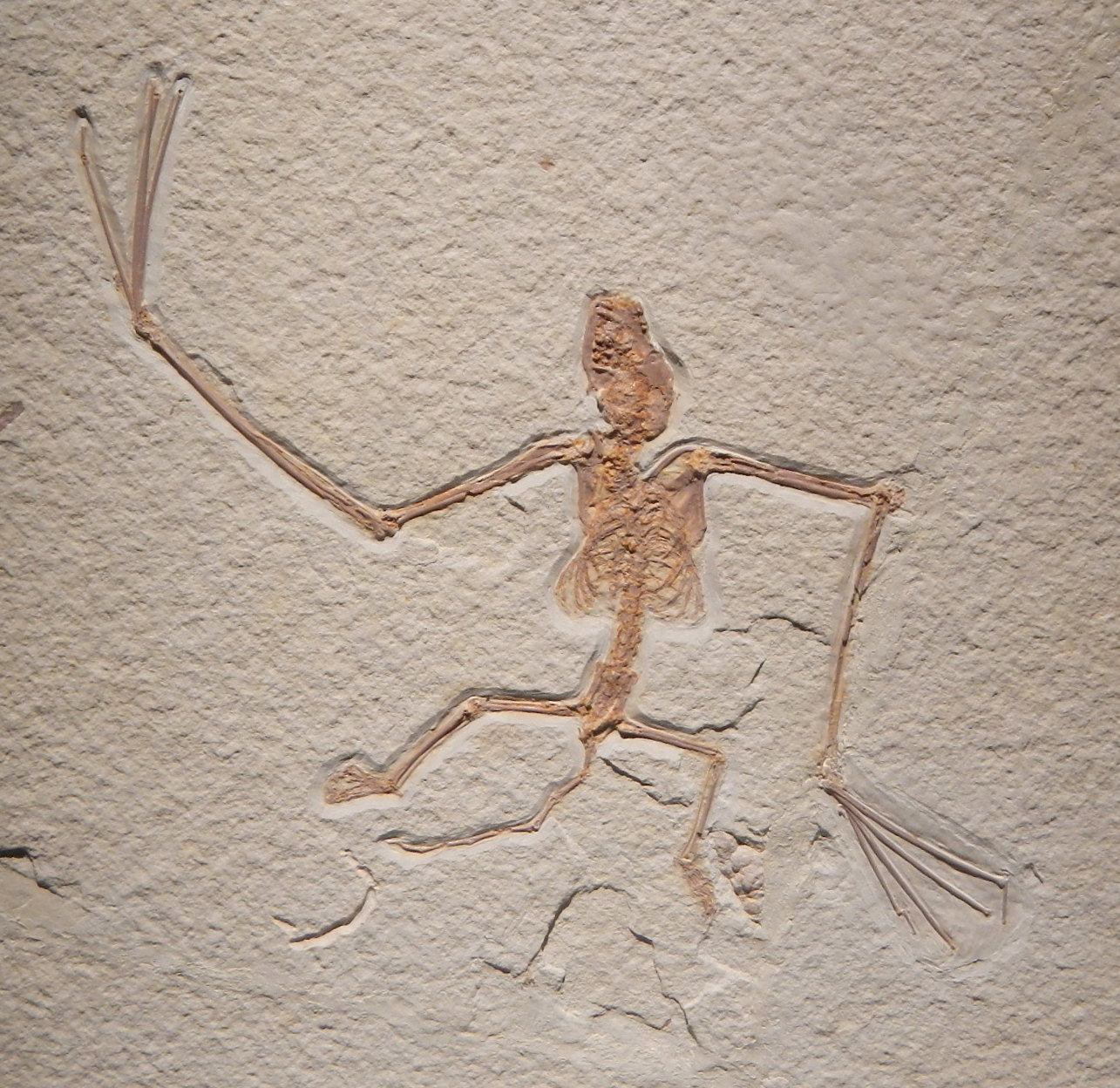
- Fossilized skeleton of the Eocene bat Icaronycteris
  †Icaronycteris – type locality for genus
  - †Icaronycteris index – type locality for species
- †Ignacius
  - †Ignacius clarkforkensis – type locality for species
  - †Ignacius fremontensis
  - †Ignacius frugivorus
  - †Ignacius graybullianus
- †Iguanavus – type locality for genus
  - †Iguanavus exilis – type locality for species
- †Indusia
  - †Indusia calculosa – type locality for species
- †Insulapollenites
  - †Insulapollenites leboensis
  - †Insulapollenites rugulatus
- †Intyrictis
  - †Intyrictis vanvaleni
- †Iridodon – type locality for genus
  - †Iridodon datzae – type locality for species
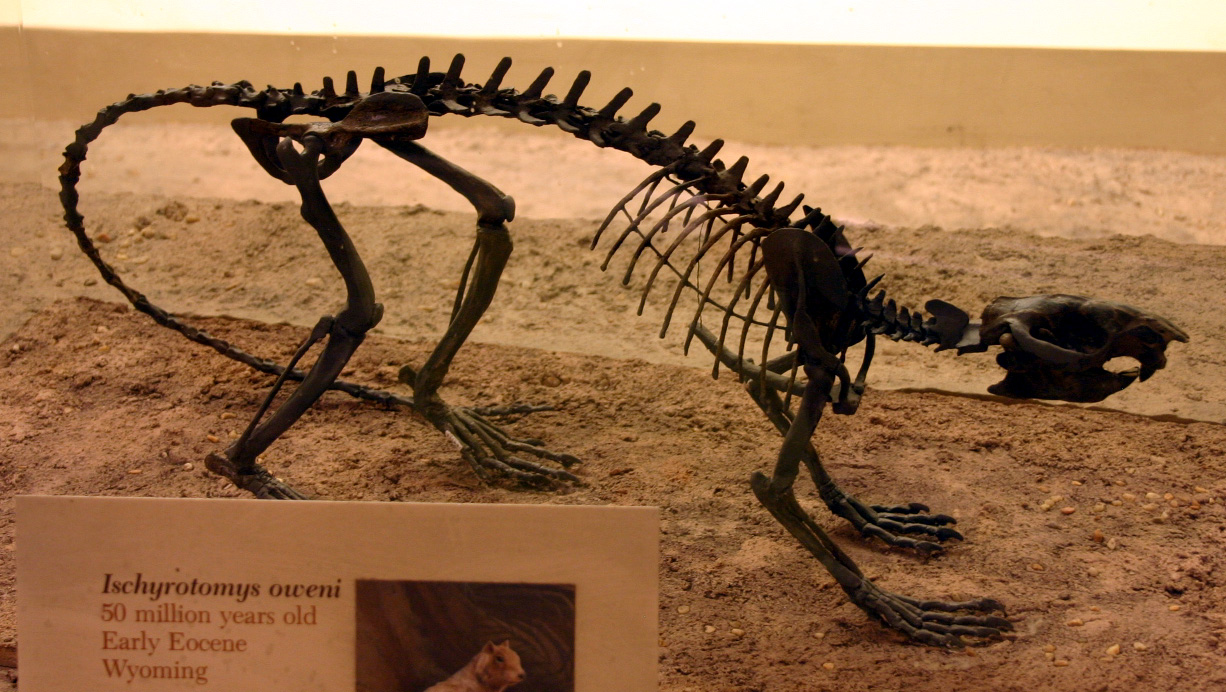
- Mounted fossilized skeleton of the Eocene-Oligocene rodent Ischyromys
  †Ischyromys
  - †Ischyromys typus
  - †Ischyromys veterior
- †Isectolophus
  - †Isectolophus latidens
  - †Isectolophus radinskyi – type locality for species
- †Isoetites
  - †Isoetites horridus
- †Iulus
  - †Iulus telluster – type locality for species

== J ==
- †Jepsenella
  - †Jepsenella praepropera
- †Jepsibaena
  - †Jepsibaena minor – type locality for species
- †Joffrea
  - †Joffrea BB20 informal
  - †Joffrea FW50 informal
- †Judithemys
  - †Judithemys backmani – or unidentified comparable form
- †Juglandicarya
- †Juglandiphyllites
  - †Juglandiphyllites glabra
- Juglans
  - †Juglans crescentia
  - †Juglans laurifolia
  - †Juglans rugosa
  - †Juglans schimperi
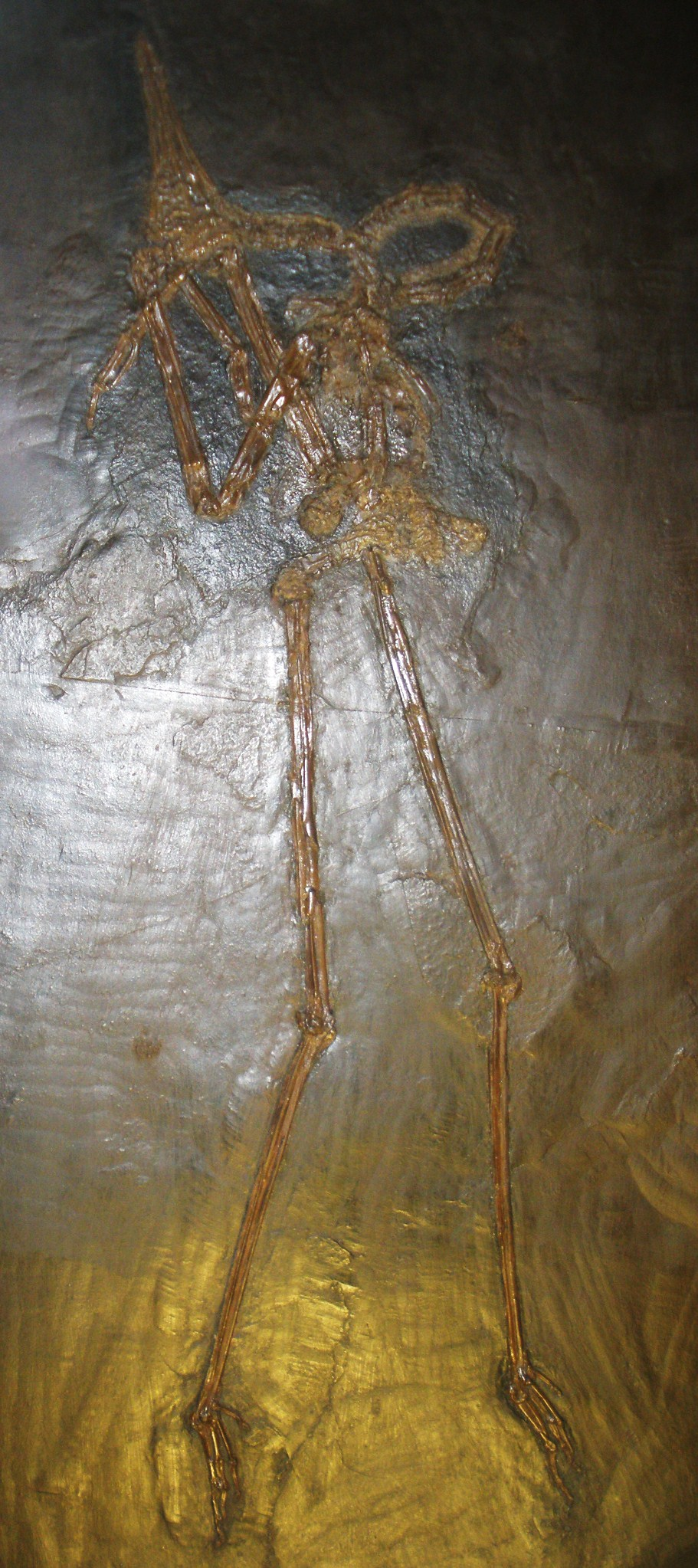
- Fossilized skeleton of the Eocene wading bird Juncitarsus
  †Juncitarsus – type locality for genus
  - †Juncitarsus gracillimus – type locality for species
- Junco – or unidentified comparable form
  - †Junco hyemalis
- †Junglandaceae

== K ==
- †Kalmia
  - †Kalmia elliptica
- †Kalobatippus
  - †Kalobatippus agatensis
  - †Kalobatippus avus
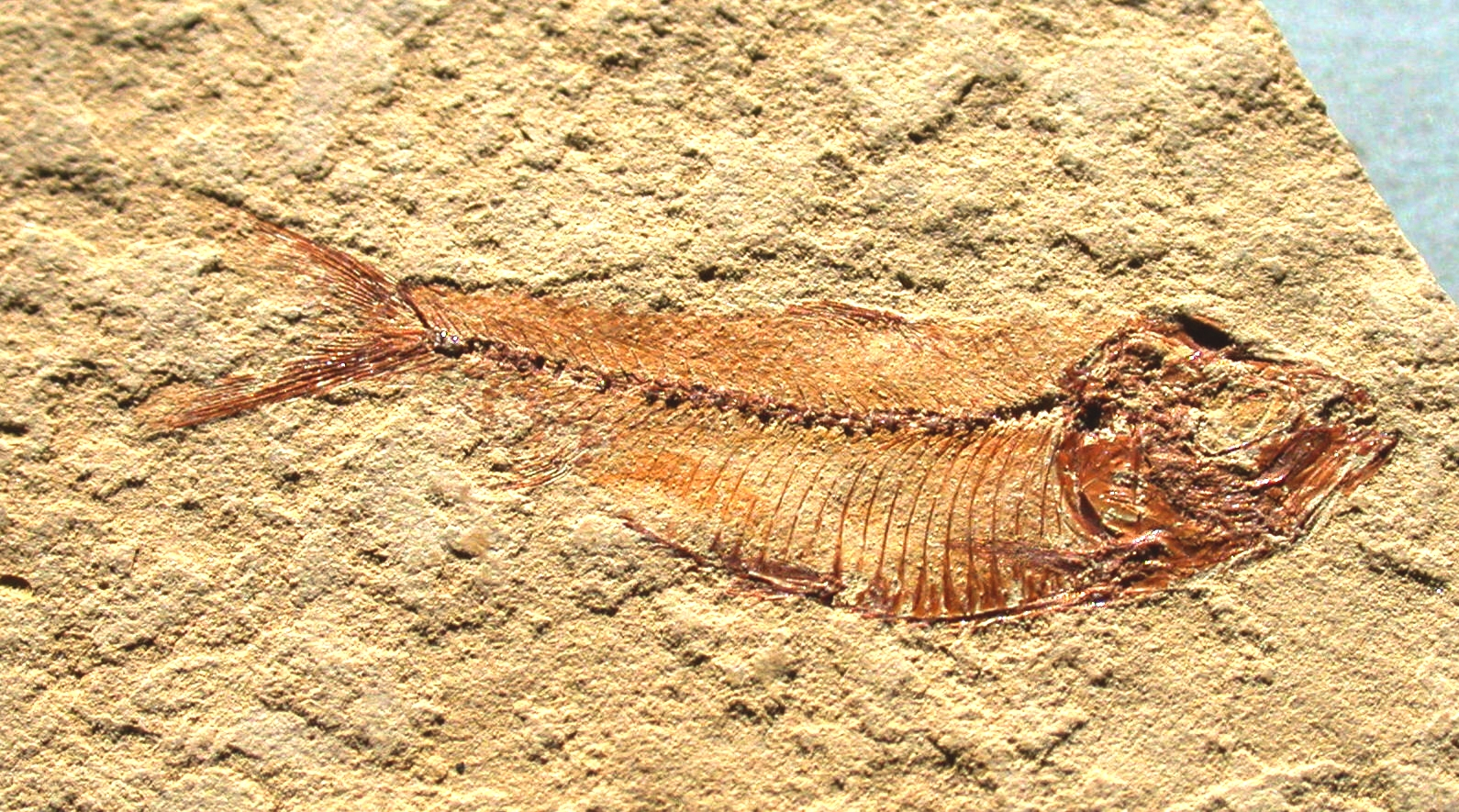
- Fossilized skeleton of the Eocene bony fish Knightia
  †Knightia
  - †Knightia eocaena
- †Knightomys
  - †Knightomys cremneus
  - †Knightomys cuspidatus
  - †Knightomys depressus
  - †Knightomys huerfanensis
  - †Knightomys minor
  - †Knightomys senior
- Koelreuteria
  - †Koelreuteria viridifluminis
- †Koniaryctes
  - †Koniaryctes paulus – type locality for species
- †Kydia – or unidentified related form
  - †Kydia FW61 informal

== L ==
- †Labidolemur
  - †Labidolemur kayi
  - †Labidolemur major – type locality for species
  - †Labidolemur serus
  - †Labidolemur soricoides
- Laccobius
  - †Laccobius elongatus – type locality for species
- †Laevigatosporites
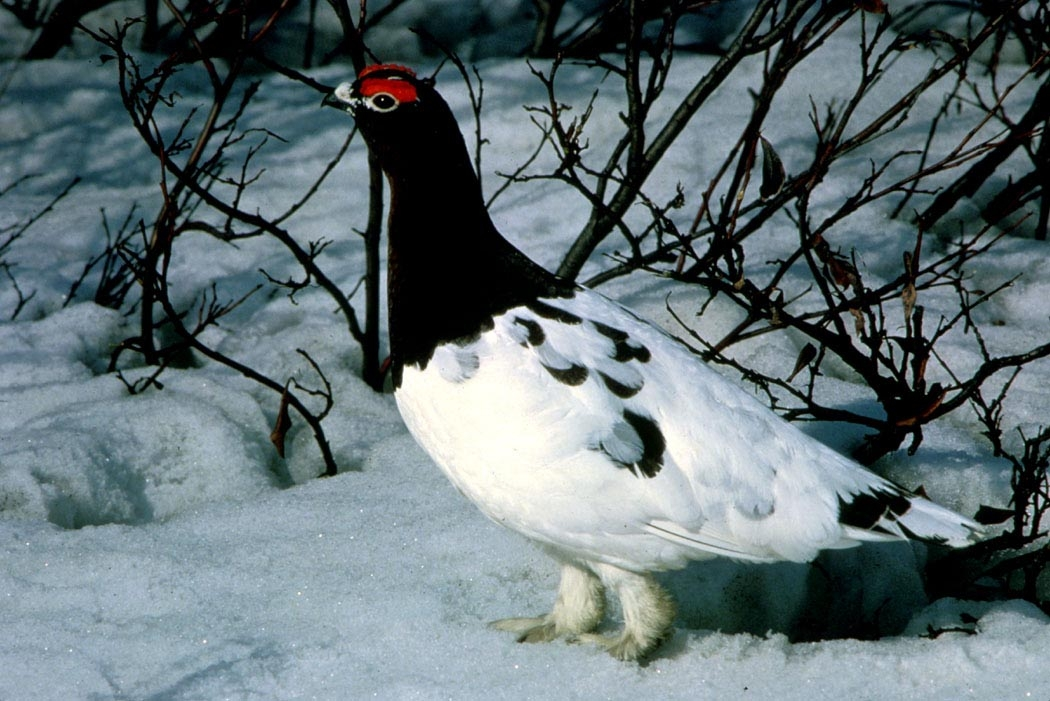
- A living Lagopus, or ptarmigan
  †Lagopus
  - †Lagopus leucurus – or unidentified comparable form
- †Lambdotherium
  - †Lambdotherium popoagicum
- †Lambertocyon
  - †Lambertocyon eximius
  - †Lambertocyon gingerichi – type locality for species
- Lanius
  - †Lanius ludovicianus
- Larus – or unidentified comparable form
- †Lastrea
  - †Lastrea goldiana
- Lathrobium
  - †Lathrobium abscessum – type locality for species
- †Laurinoxylon
  - †Laurinoxylon pulchellum
- †Laurophyllum
  - †Laurophyllum caudatum
  - †Laurophyllum perseanum
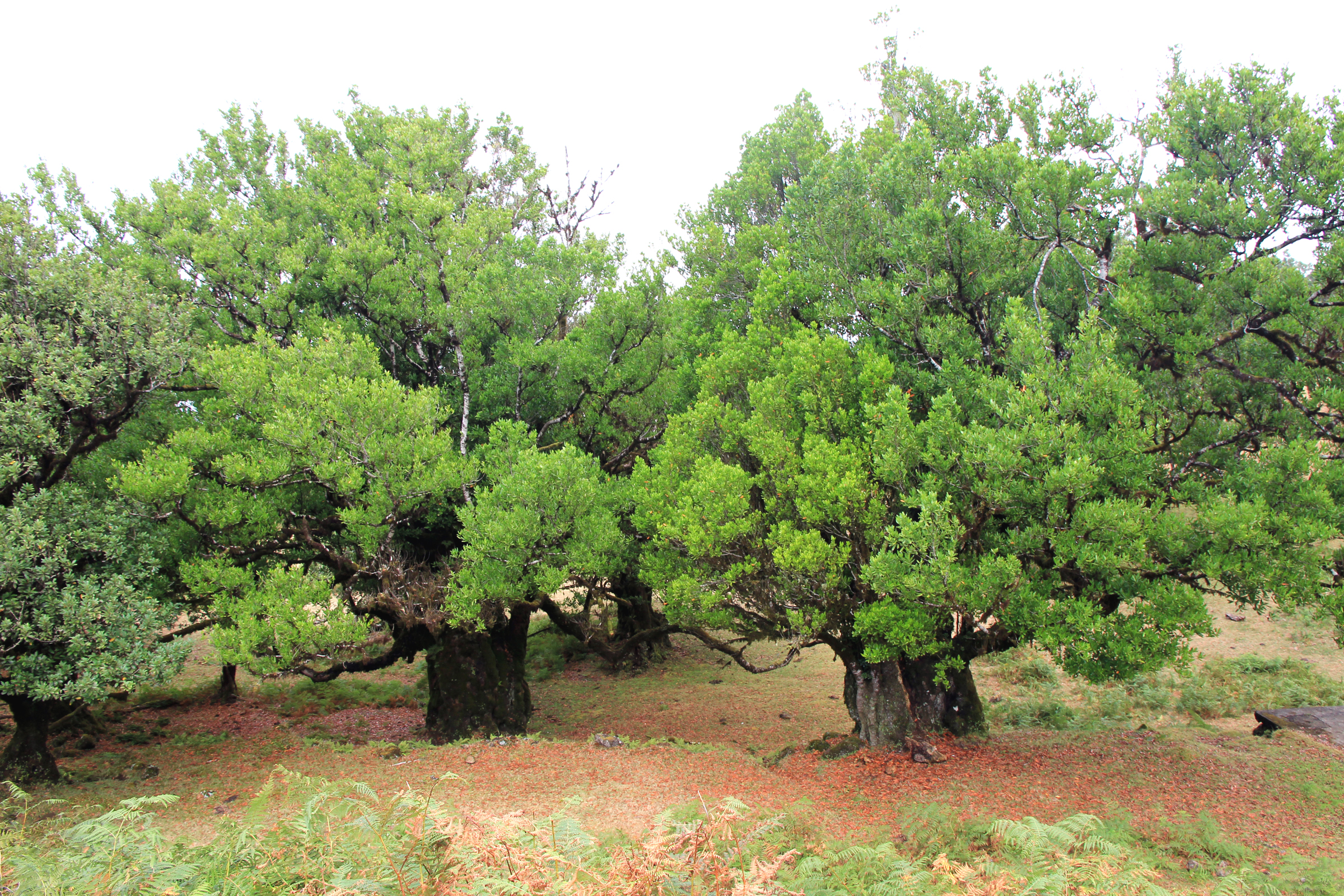
- Living Laurus, or laurel trees
  Laurus
  - †Laurus californica
  - †Laurus grandis
  - †Laurus montana
  - †Laurus perdita
  - †Laurus primigenia – tentative report
  - †Laurus princeps
  - †Laurus socialis
- †Leguminosites
  - †Leguminosites coloradensis
  - †Leguminosites lamarensis
  - †Leguminosites lesquereuxiana
  - †Leguminosites regularis – type locality for species
- Leiocephalus
- †Leipsanolestes
  - †Leipsanolestes siegfriedti
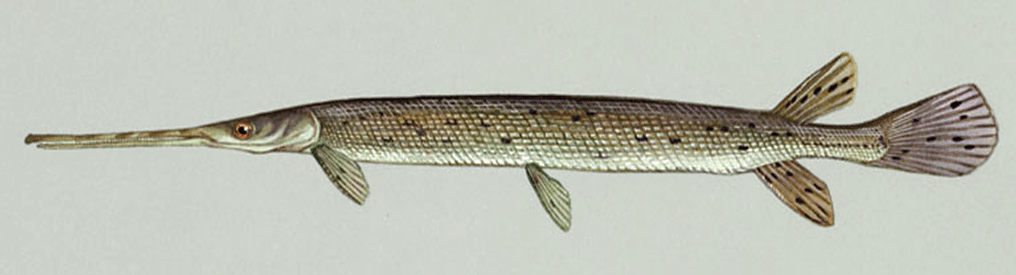
- Illustration of a living Lepisosteus, or gar
  Lepisosteus
  - †Lepisosteus glaber – or unidentified comparable form
  - †Lepisosteus occidentalis
- †Leptacodon
  - †Leptacodon donkroni
  - †Leptacodon munusculum
  - †Leptacodon packi – type locality for species
  - †Leptacodon tener
- †Leptarctus – or unidentified comparable form
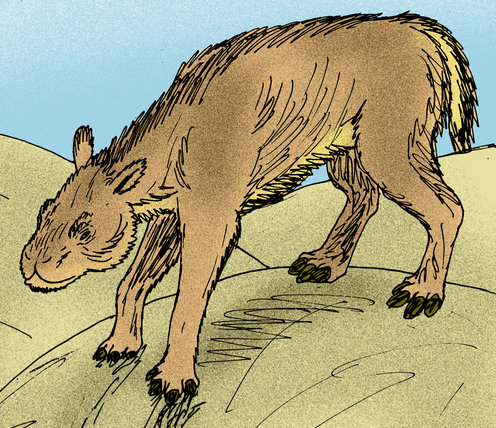
- Restoration of the Oligocene-Miocene oreodont mammal Leptauchenia
  †Leptauchenia
  - †Leptauchenia decora
  - †Leptauchenia major
- †Leptictis
  - †Leptictis dakotensis
- †Leptocyon
  - †Leptocyon gregorii
- †Leptolambda
  - †Leptolambda schmidti
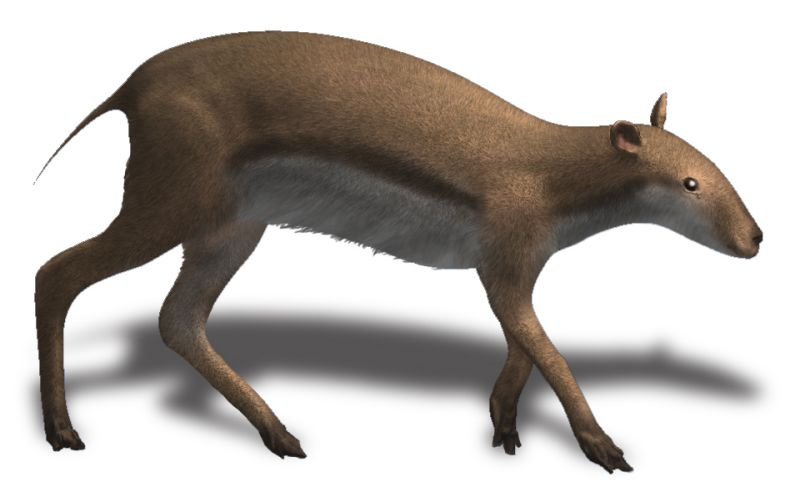
- Life restoration of the Eocene-Oligocene even-toed ungulate Leptomeryx
  †Leptomeryx
  - †Leptomeryx esulcatus
  - †Leptomeryx evansi
  - †Leptomeryx mammifer
  - †Leptomeryx semicinctus
  - †Leptomeryx speciosus
  - †Leptomeryx yoderi – type locality for species
- †Leptoreodon
- †Leptotomus
  - †Leptotomus guildayi
  - †Leptotomus parvus – type locality for species
- †Leptotragulus
  - †Leptotragulus clarki – or unidentified comparable form
  - †Leptotragulus medius
  - †Leptotragulus ultimus
- Lepus
- Lepyrus – tentative report
  - †Lepyrus evictus – type locality for species
- †Lestophis
  - †Lestophis anceps – type locality for species
  - †Lestophis crassus – type locality for species
- †Leucosticte
  - †Leucosticte arctoa
- †Limaconyssus – type locality for genus
  - †Limaconyssus habrus – type locality for species
- †Limalophus
  - †Limalophus compositus
  - †Limalophus contractus – type locality for species
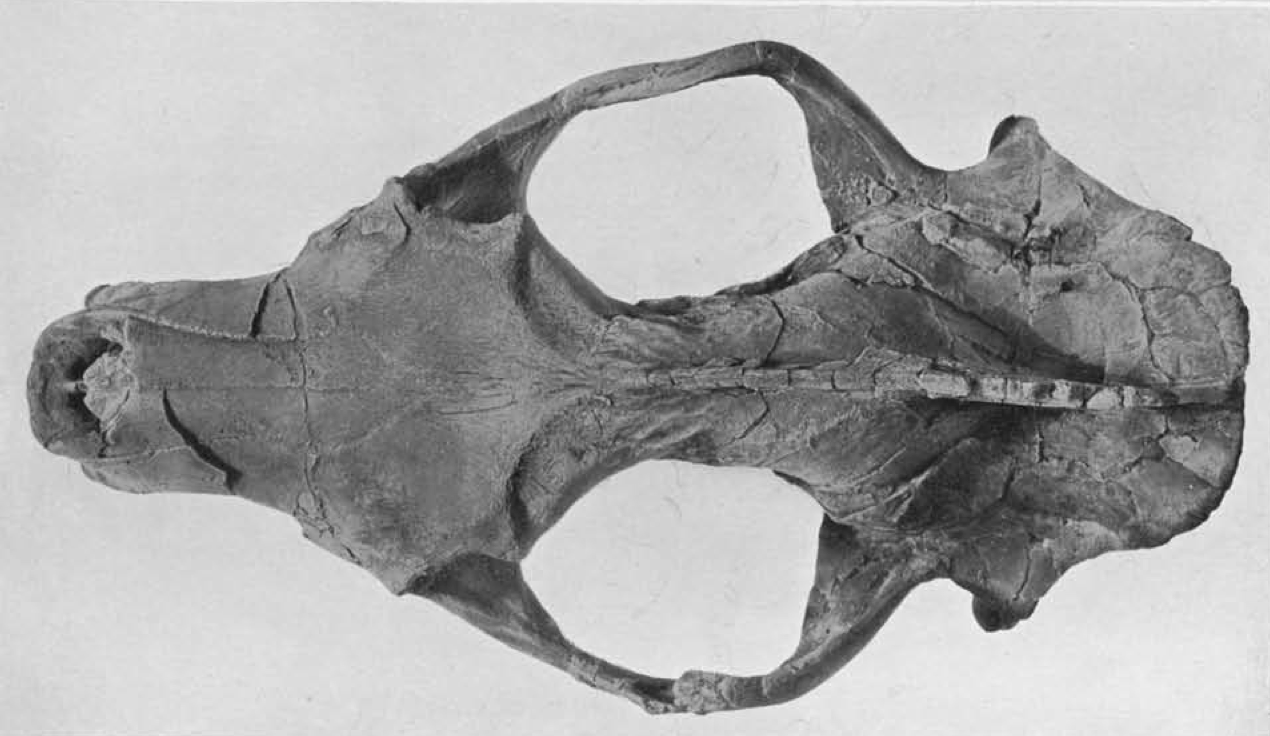
- Top view of a fossilized skull of the Eocene creodont mammal Limnocyon
  †Limnocyon
  - †Limnocyon cuspidens – type locality for species
  - †Limnocyon medius
  - †Limnocyon potens – type locality for species
  - †Limnocyon velox – type locality for species
  - †Limnocyon verus – type locality for species
- †Limnoecus
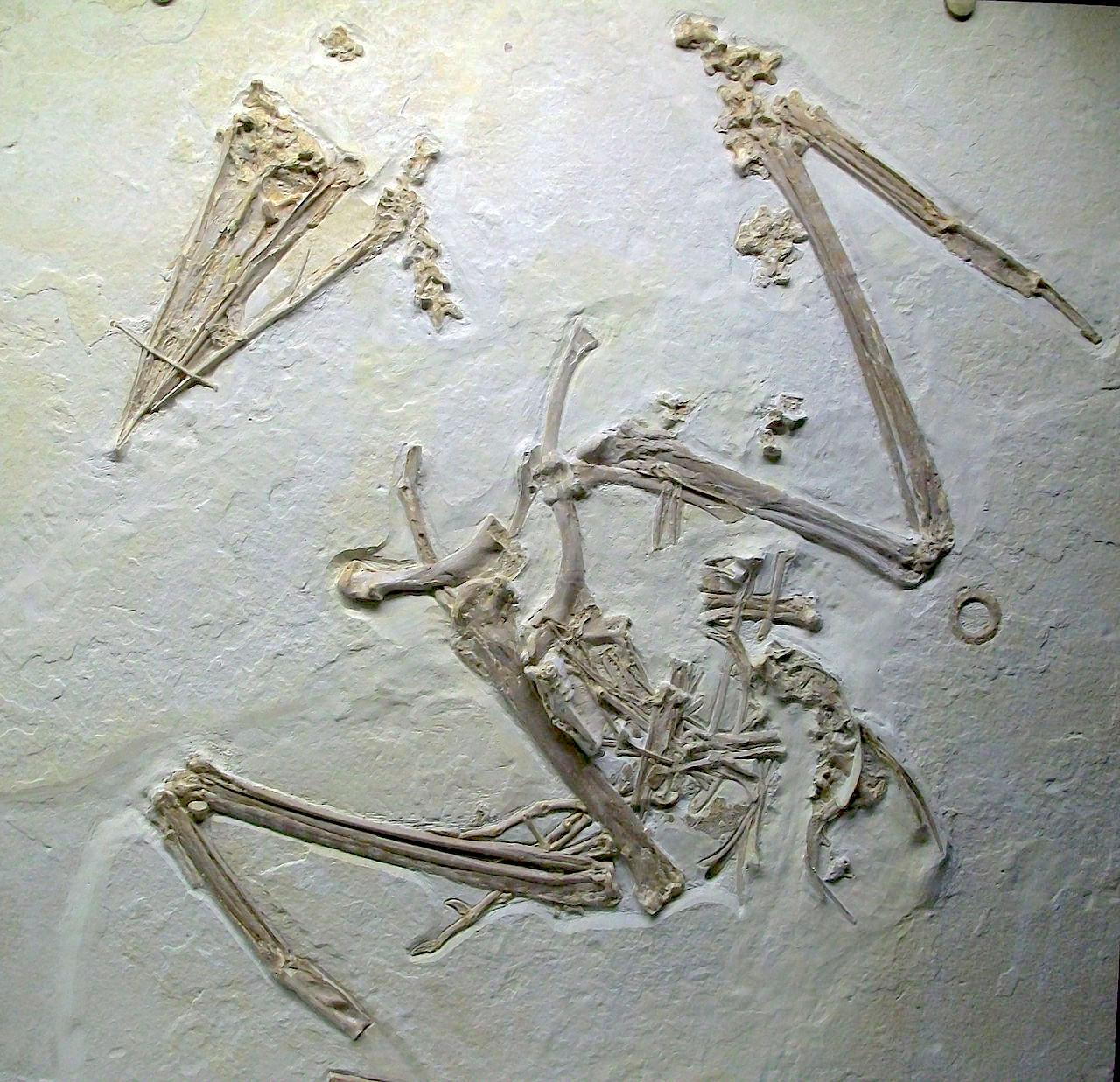
- Fossilized skeleton of the Eocene freshwater frigatebird Limnofregata
  †Limnofregata – type locality for genus
  - †Limnofregata azygosternon – type locality for species
  - †Limnofregata hutchisoni – type locality for species
- Lindera
  - †Lindera obtusata
  - †Lindera varifolia – type locality for species
- †Lisserpeton
  - †Lisserpeton bairdi
- †Listronotus
  - †Listronotus muratus – type locality for species
- †Litaletes
  - †Litaletes disjunctus
  - †Litaletes ondolinde
- †Lithexorista – type locality for genus
  - †Lithexorista scudderi – type locality for species
- †Lithohypoderma
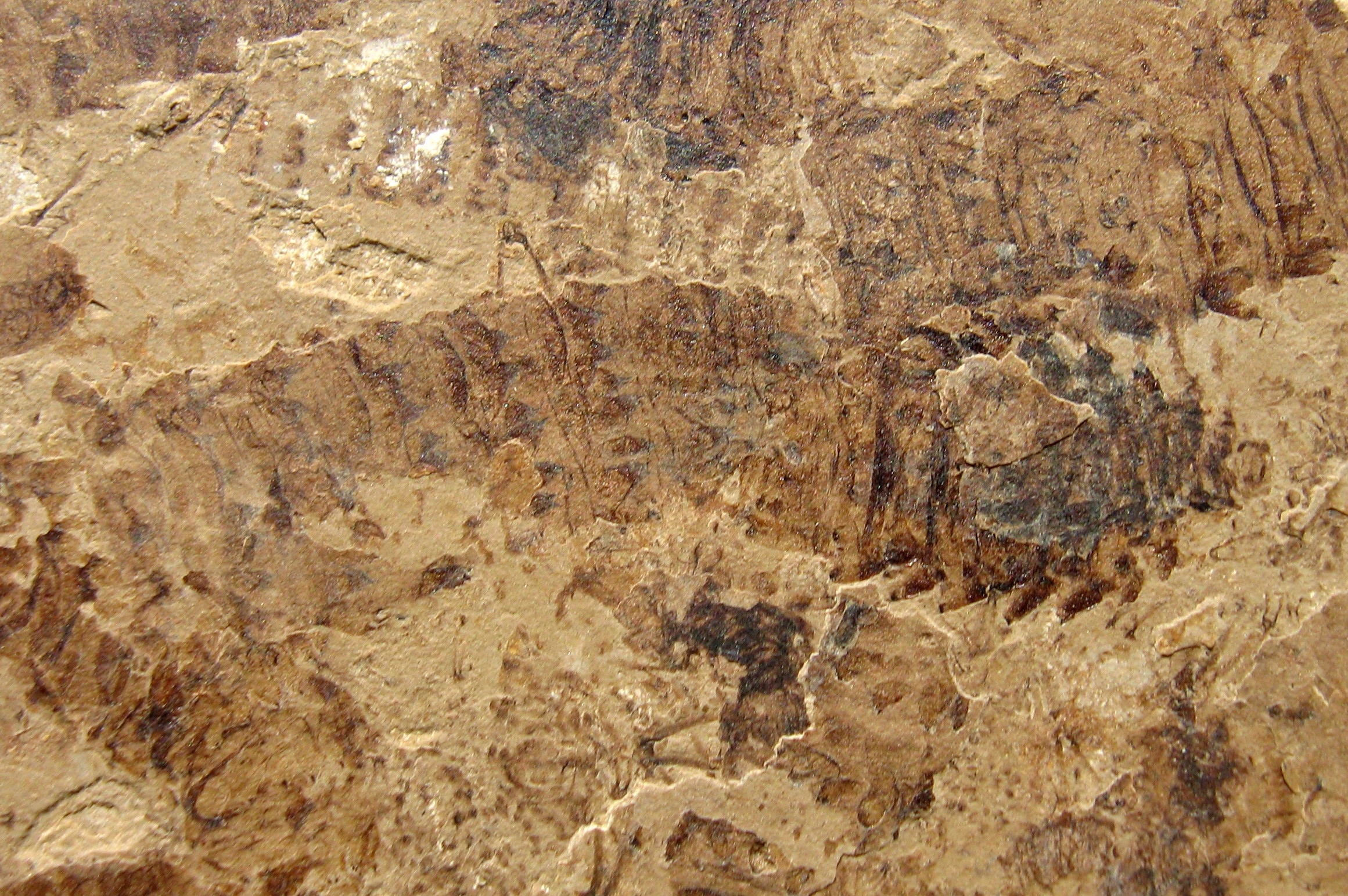
  - A Lithohypoderma ascarides larva
    †Lithohypoderma ascarides - type locality for species
- †Lithophis – type locality for genus
  - †Lithophis sargenti – type locality for species
- †Lithophysa – type locality for genus
  - †Lithophysa tumulta – type locality for species
- †Lithopsis – type locality for genus
  - †Lithopsis elongata – type locality for species
  - †Lithopsis fimbriata – type locality for species
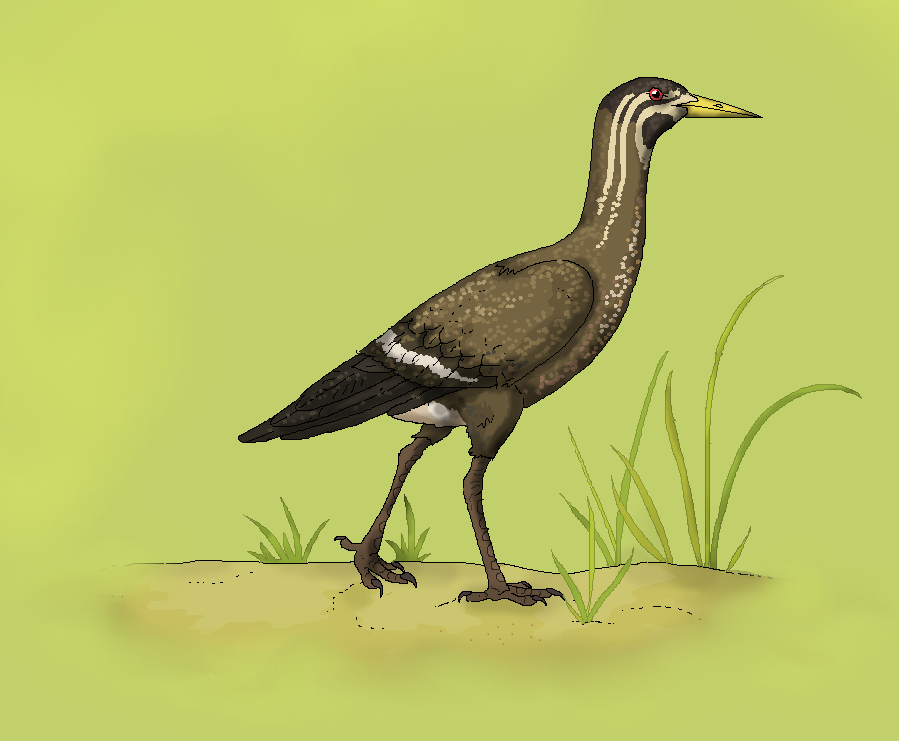
- Life restoration of the Paleocene-Eocene bird Lithornis
  †Lithornis
  - †Lithornis plebius – type locality for species
  - †Lithornis promiscuus – type locality for species
- †Lithotorus – type locality for genus
  - †Lithotorus cressoni – type locality for species
- †Litocherus
  - †Litocherus lacunatus – type locality for species
  - †Litocherus notissimus
  - †Litocherus zygeus – type locality for species
- †Litolagus
  - †Litolagus molidens
- †Litolestes
  - †Litolestes ignotus – type locality for species
- †Litomylus
  - †Litomylus dissentaneus – type locality for species
  - †Litomylus ishami – type locality for species
  - †Litomylus scaphicus – type locality for species
- †Litoyoderimys
  - †Litoyoderimys auogoleus
- †Lophiotherium
  - †Lophiotherium vasacciensis – type locality for species
- †Lophiparamys
  - †Lophiparamys debequensis
  - †Lophiparamys murinus
  - †Lophiparamys woodi
- †Lophocion
  - †Lophocion grangeri – type locality for species
- †Loveina – type locality for genus
  - †Loveina minuta
  - †Loveina sheai
  - †Loveina wapitiensis
  - †Loveina zephyri – type locality for species
- †Loxolophus
  - †Loxolophus criswelli
  - †Loxolophus faulkneri – type locality for species
  - †Loxolophus hyattianus – or unidentified comparable form
  - †Loxolophus priscus
- †Lucashyus – type locality for genus
  - †Lucashyus coombsae – type locality for species
- †Lyctocoris – tentative report
  - †Lyctocoris terreus – type locality for species
- Lygodium
  - †Lygodium coloradense
  - †Lygodium kaulfussi
- Lynx
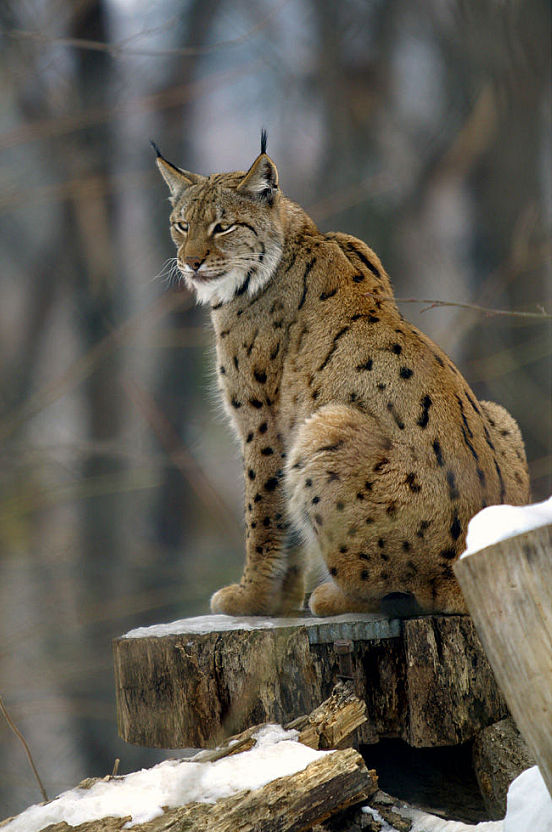
  - A living Lynx lynx, or Eurasian lynx
    †Lynx lynx – tentative report
- †Lystra – tentative report
  - †Lystra leei – type locality for species
  - †Lystra richardsoni – type locality for species

== M ==
- †Maceopolipollenites
  - †Maceopolipollenites amplus
  - †Maceopolipollenites leboensis
  - †Maceopolipollenites rotundus
  - †Maceopolipollenites tenuipolus
  - †Maceopolipollenites triorbicularis
- †Macginitiea
  - †Macginitiea gracilis
  - †Macginitiea wyomingensis
- †Machaeroides
  - †Machaeroides eothen
  - †Machaeroides simpsoni – type locality for species
- †Machaerosaurus
  - †Machaerosaurus torrejonensis
- Macrocranion
  - †Macrocranion junnei – type locality for species
  - †Macrocranion nitens
  - †Macrocranion robinsoni
- †Macrotarsius
  - †Macrotarsius siegerti – type locality for species
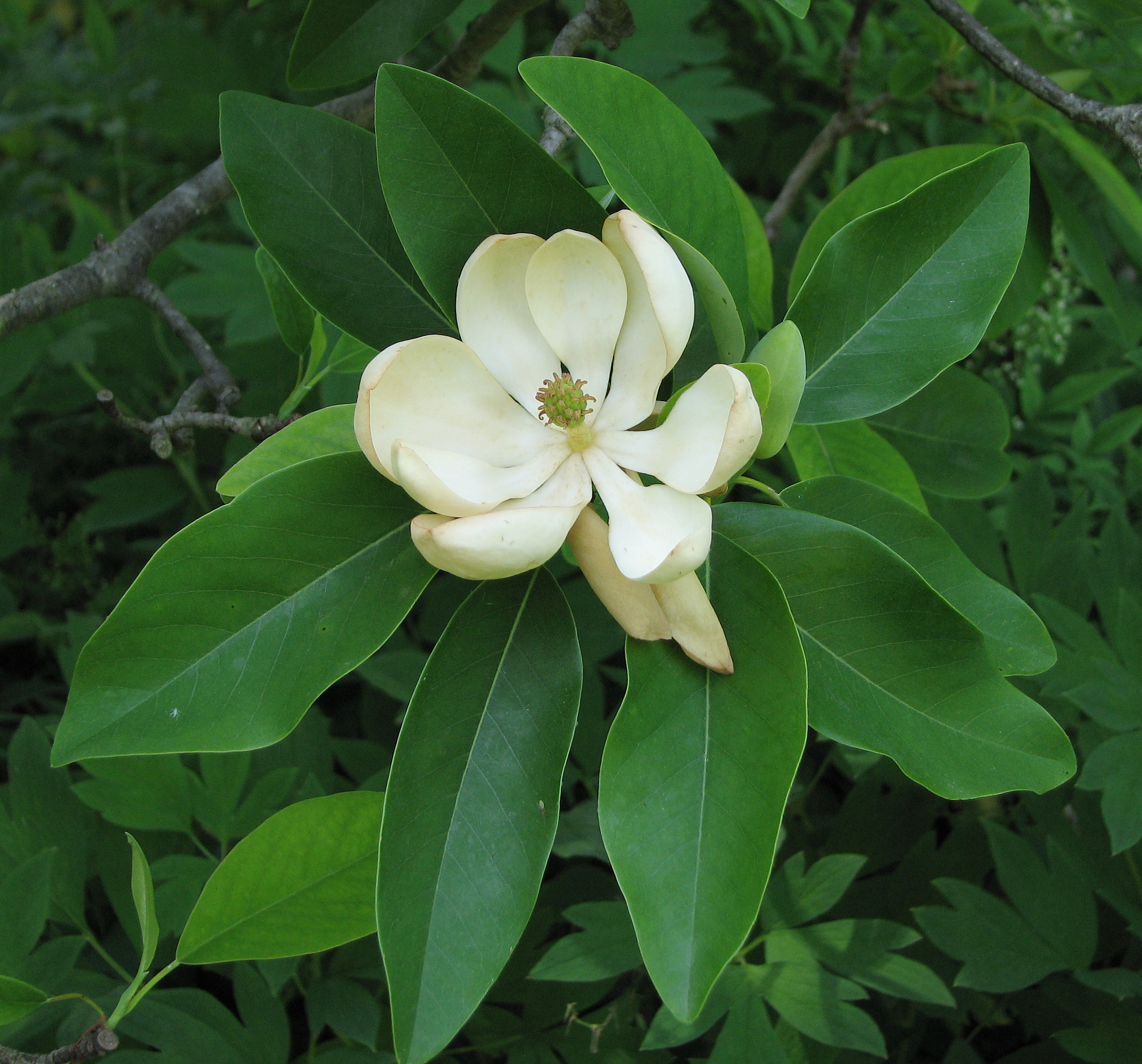
- Close-up view of a Magnolia flower
  Magnolia
  - †Magnolia borealis
  - †Magnolia californica
  - †Magnolia culveri
  - †Magnolia magnifica
  - †Magnolia magnifolia
  - †Magnolia microphylla
  - †Magnolia pollardi
  - †Magnolia spectabilis
- †Maiorana
  - †Maiorana ferrisensis – type locality for species
  - †Maiorana noctiluca
- †Malapoenna
  - †Malapoenna cuneata
  - †Malapoenna lamarensis
- †Malaquiferus
  - †Malaquiferus tourteloti – type locality for species
- †Malfelis – type locality for genus
  - †Malfelis badwaterensis – type locality for species
- †Mammacyon
  - †Mammacyon ferocior – type locality for species
- †Mammuthus
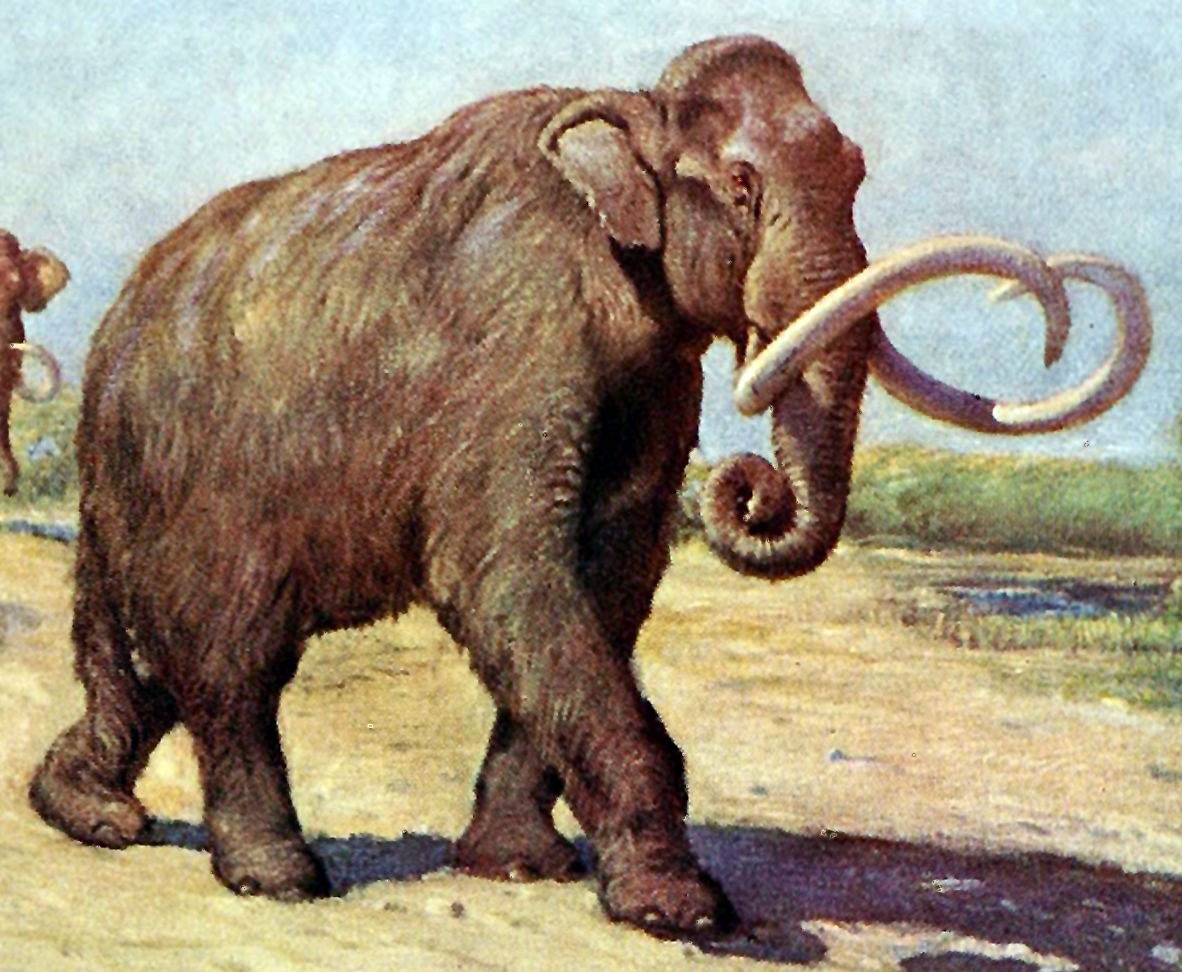
  - Life restoration of a herd of Mammuthus columbi, or Columbian mammoths. The extent of the fur depicted is hypothetical. Charles R. Knight (1909).
    †Mammuthus columbi
- Marmota
- †Marsholestes
  - †Marsholestes dasypelix – type locality for species
- †Mattimys
  - †Mattimys kalicola
- †Megacerops
  - †Megacerops osborni – type locality for species
- †Megadelphus
  - †Megadelphus lundeliusi
- †Megalagus
  - †Megalagus brachyodon
  - †Megalagus primitivus
  - †Megalagus turgidus
- †Megalesthonyx
  - †Megalesthonyx hopsoni
- Restorative portrait, reconstructed skull, and actual fossil of the Miocene weasel relative Megalictis
  †Megalictis
  - †Megalictis ferox
  - †Megalictis petersoni
- †Melanosaurus – type locality for genus
  - †Melanosaurus maximus – type locality for species
- †Melastomites
  - †Melastomites montanensis
- †Meliakrouniomys
  - †Meliakrouniomys skinneri
- †Meliosma
  - †Meliosma flexuosa
  - †Meliosma longifolia
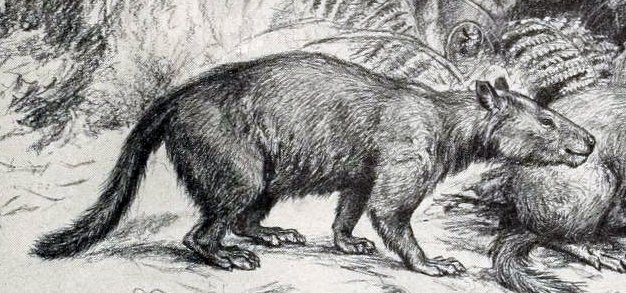
- Life restoration of the Eocene mammal Meniscotherium. Robert Bruce Horsfall (1913).
  †Meniscotherium
  - †Meniscotherium chamense
  - †Meniscotherium priscum
  - †Meniscotherium tapiacetum
  - †Meniscotherium tapiacitum
- †Menisperimites
  - †Menisperimites parvareolatus
- †Menispermites
  - †Menispermites limacioides – type locality for species
  - †Menispermites parvareolatus
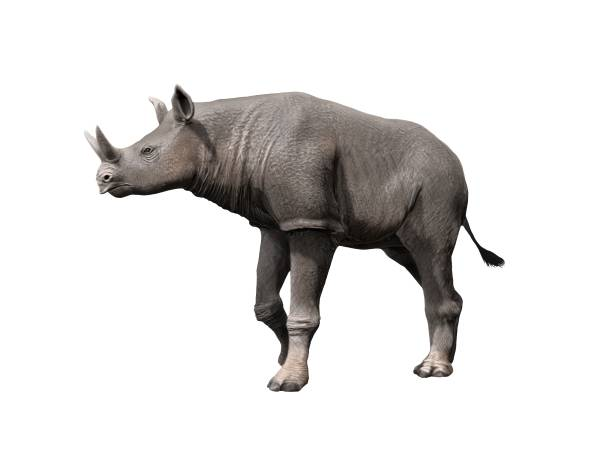
- Life restoration of the Miocene rhinoceros Menoceras
  †Menoceras
  - †Menoceras arikarense
  - †Menoceras barbouri
- †Menops
  - †Menops heloceras
  - †Menops marshi – or unidentified comparable form
- †Mentoclaenodon
  - †Mentoclaenodon acrogenius – type locality for species
- Mergus
  - †Mergus merganser
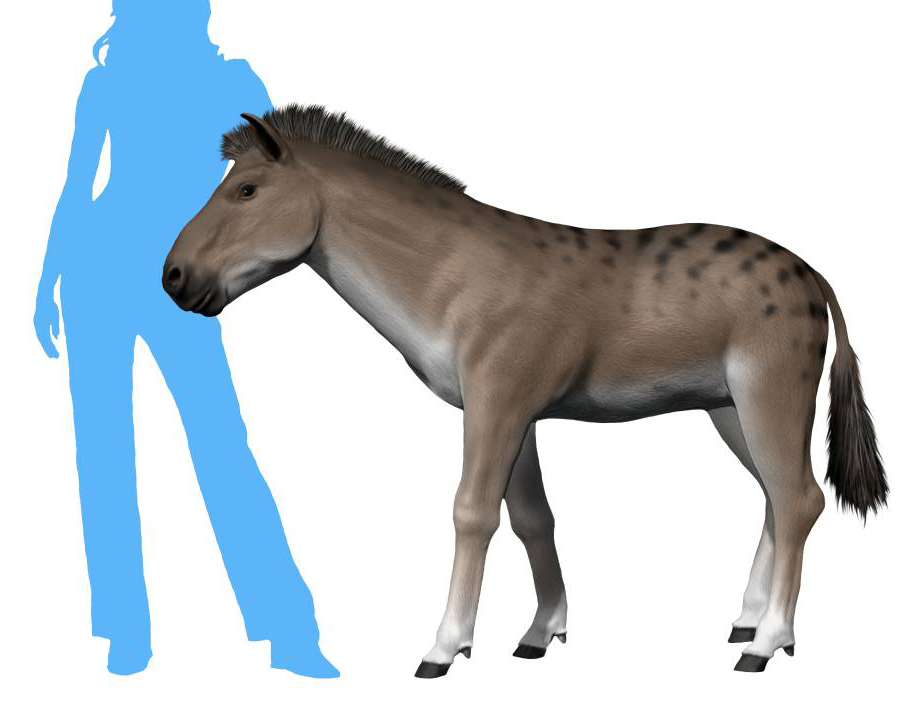
- Life restoration of the Miocene three-toed horse Merychippus
  †Merychippus
  - †Merychippus coloradense
  - †Merychippus insignis – or unidentified comparable form
  - †Merychippus primus
- †Merychyus
  - †Merychyus arenarum
  - †Merychyus crabilli
  - †Merychyus elegans – or unidentified comparable form
  - †Merychyus minimus
- †Merycobunodon – tentative report
  - †Merycobunodon walshi – type locality for species
- †Merycochoerus
  - †Merycochoerus chelydra
  - †Merycochoerus magnus
  - †Merycochoerus matthewi
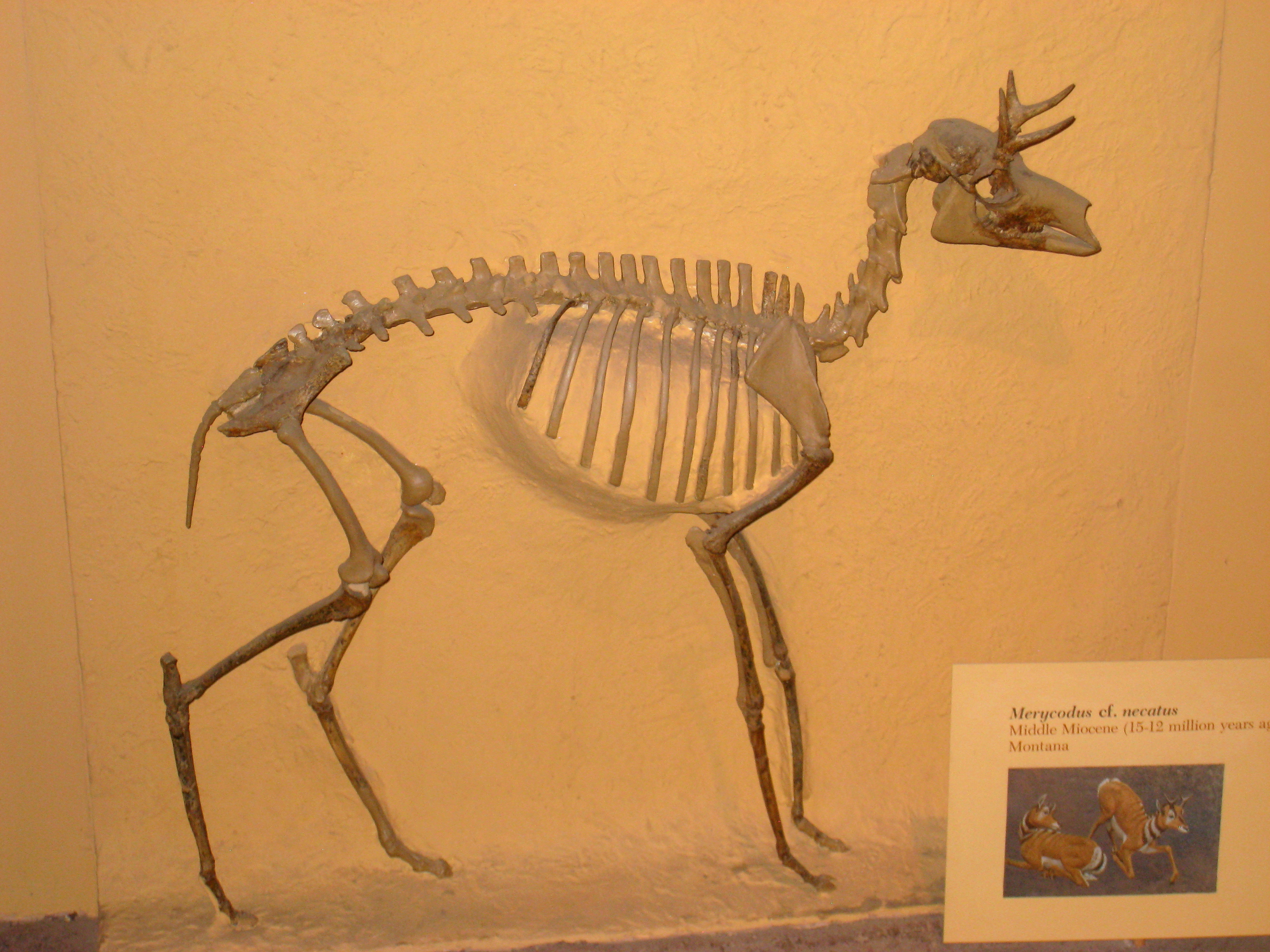
- Mounted fossilized skeleton of the Miocene pronghorn Merycodus
  †Merycodus
  - †Merycodus sabulonis – or unidentified comparable form
  - †Merycodus warreni – or unidentified comparable form
- †Merycoides
  - †Merycoides longiceps
  - †Merycoides pariogonus
- †Merycoidodon
  - †Merycoidodon culbertsoni – type locality for species
  - †Merycoidodon major
  - †Merycoidodon presidioensis – or unidentified comparable form
- †Mesatirhinus
  - †Mesatirhinus megarhinus
- †Mesocyon – report made of unidentified related form or using admittedly obsolete nomenclature
  - †Mesocyon temnodon
- †Mesodma
  - †Mesodma ambigua – type locality for species
  - †Mesodma formosa
  - †Mesodma garfieldensis – or unidentified comparable form
  - †Mesodma hensleighi
  - †Mesodma pygmaea
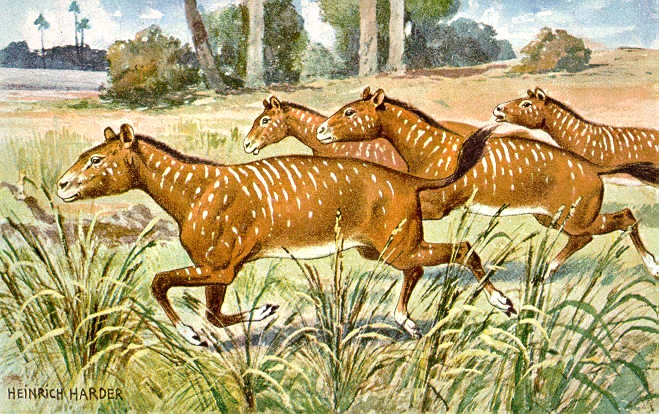
- Life restoration of the Eocene-Oligocene horse Mesohippus. Heinrich Harder (c. 1920).
  †Mesohippus
  - †Mesohippus bairdi
  - †Mesohippus westoni – or unidentified comparable form
- †Mesomeryx – or unidentified comparable form
  - †Mesomeryx grangeri
- †Mesonyx
  - †Mesonyx obtusidens – type locality for species
- †Mesoreodon
  - †Mesoreodon chelonyx
  - †Mesoreodon minor – type locality for species
- †Mesoscalops
  - †Mesoscalops scopelotemos
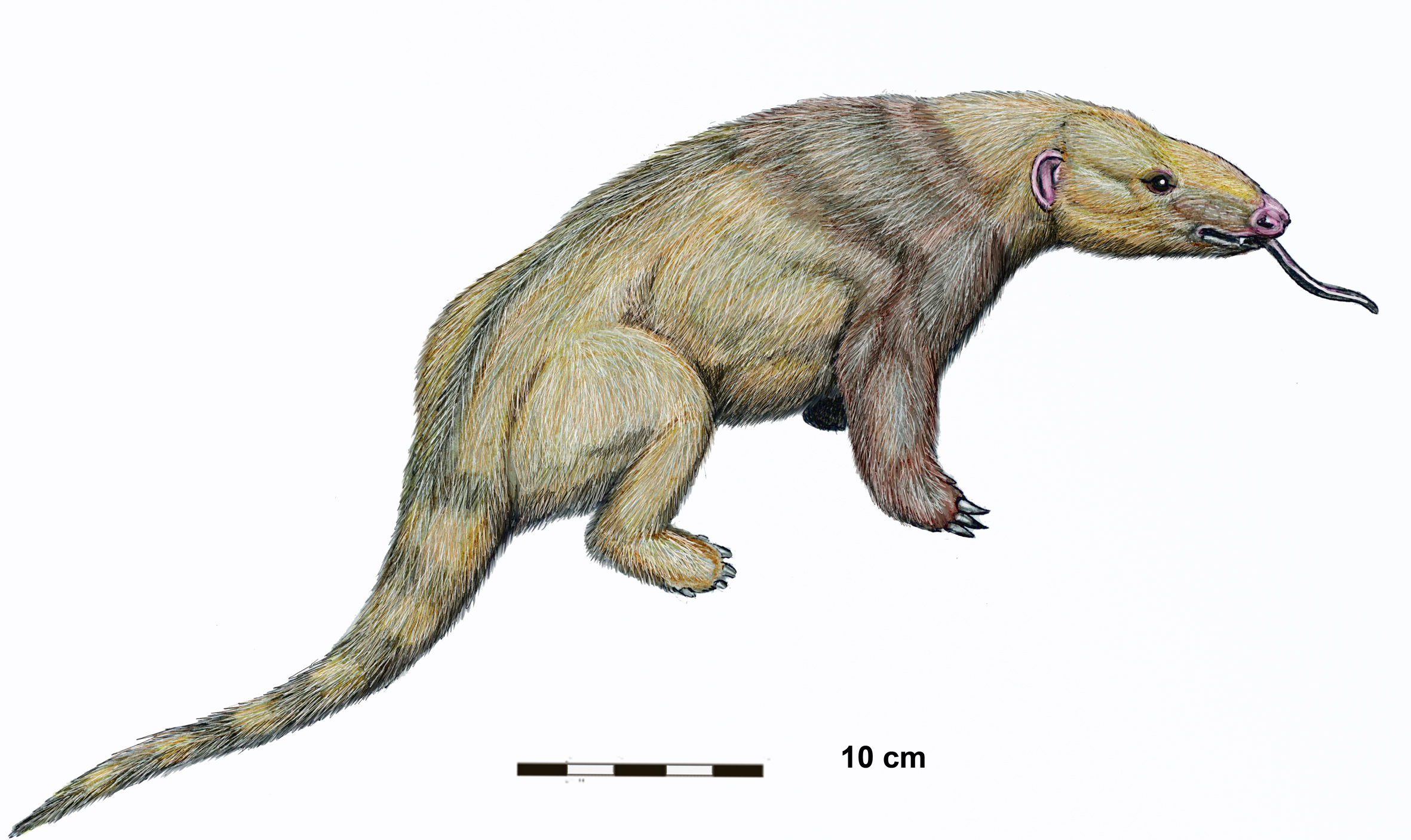
- Life restoration of the Eocene pangolin relative Metacheiromys
  †Metacheiromys
  - †Metacheiromys dasypus – type locality for species
  - †Metacheiromys marshi – type locality for species
- †Metadjidaumo
  - †Metadjidaumo hendryi – type locality for species
- †Metamynodon
  - †Metamynodon planifrons – or unidentified comparable form
- †Metanoiamys
  - †Metanoiamys paradoxus
- †Metarhinus
- Metasequoia
  - †Metasequoia occidentalis
- †Metatomarctus
  - †Metatomarctus canavus
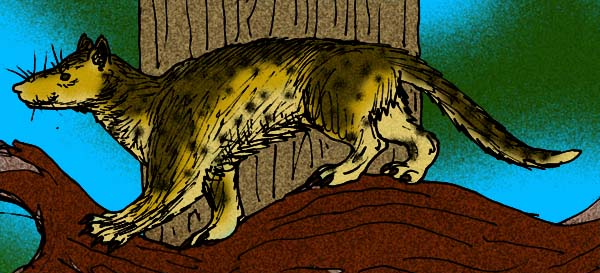
- Life restoration of the Paleocene-Eocene mammal Miacis
  †Miacis
  - †Miacis deutschi
  - †Miacis exiguus
  - †Miacis latidens
  - †Miacis medius
  - †Miacis parvivorus – type locality for species
  - †Miacis petilus
  - †Miacis vorax
- †Michenia
- Micrasema – tentative report
  - †Micrasema tessellatum – type locality for species
- †Microclaenodon
  - †Microclaenodon assurgens
- †Microcosmodon
  - †Microcosmodon conus – type locality for species
  - †Microcosmodon rosei – type locality for species
- †Micromomys
  - †Micromomys antelucanus
  - †Micromomys silvercouleei – type locality for species
- †Microparamys
  - †Microparamys cheradius
  - †Microparamys dubius
  - †Microparamys hunterae
  - †Microparamys minutus
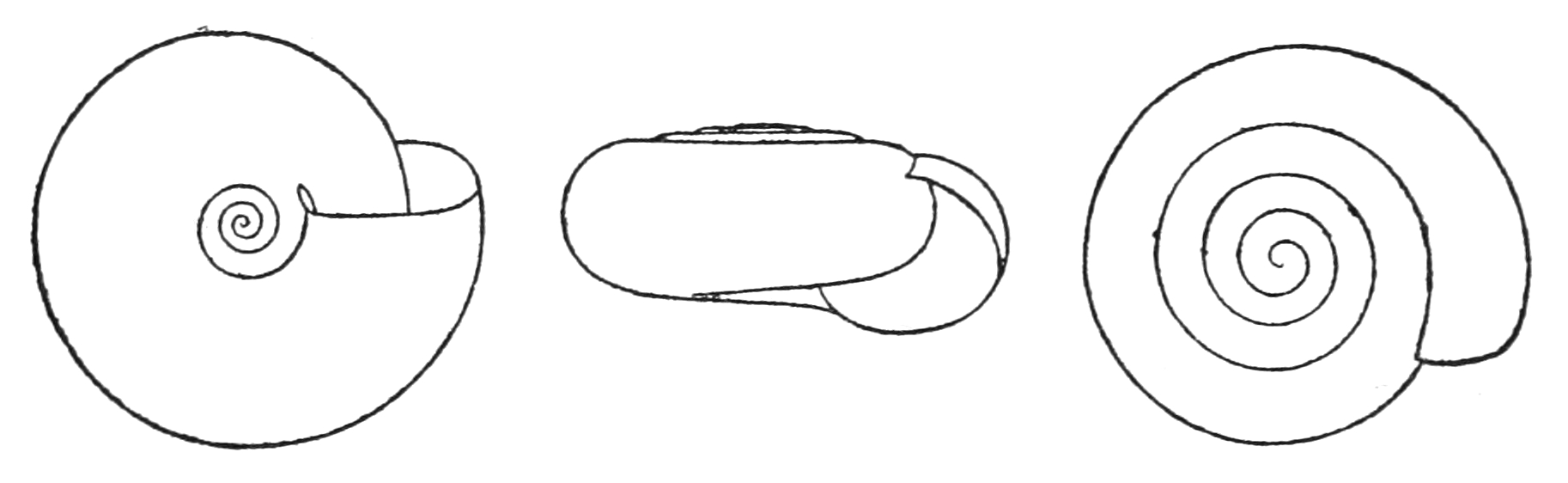
- Illustration of the shell in multiple views of a living Microphysula land snail
  Microphysula – or unidentified comparable form
- †Micropternodus
  - †Micropternodus borealis
- †Microsus
  - †Microsus cuspidatus – type locality for species
- †Microsyops
  - †Microsyops angustidens – type locality for species
  - †Microsyops annectens
  - †Microsyops cardiorestes
  - †Microsyops elegans – type locality for species
  - †Microsyops knightensis
  - †Microsyops latidens
  - †Microsyops scottianus
- Microtus
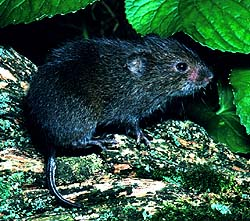
  - A living Microtus pennsylvanicus, or meadow vole
    †Microtus pennsylvanicus
- Mictomys
  - †Mictomys vetus
- †Mimatuta
  - †Mimatuta makpialutae
  - †Mimatuta minuial – type locality for species
- †Mimetodon
  - †Mimetodon churchilli – type locality for species
  - †Mimetodon silberlingi
- †Mimoperadectes
  - †Mimoperadectes houdei – type locality for species
  - †Mimoperadectes labrus – type locality for species
- †Mimosites
  - †Mimosites coloradensis
- †Mimotricentes
  - †Mimotricentes fremontensis – type locality for species
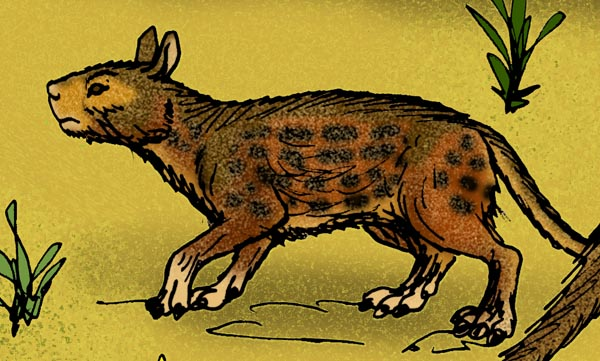
- Life restoration of the Eocene-Oligocene oreodont mammal Miniochoerus
  †Miniochoerus
  - †Miniochoerus affinis – type locality for species
  - †Miniochoerus chadronensis – type locality for species
  - †Miniochoerus forsythae
  - †Miniochoerus gracilis
- †Minippus
  - †Minippus index
- †Mioclaenus
  - †Mioclaenus opisthacus – or unidentified comparable form
  - †Mioclaenus turgidus
- †Miocyon
  - †Miocyon major – or unidentified comparable form
- †Mioheteromys
  - †Mioheteromys amplissimus
- †Miohippus
  - †Miohippus obliquidens
- †Miolabis
  - †Miolabis fissidens
- †Miomustela
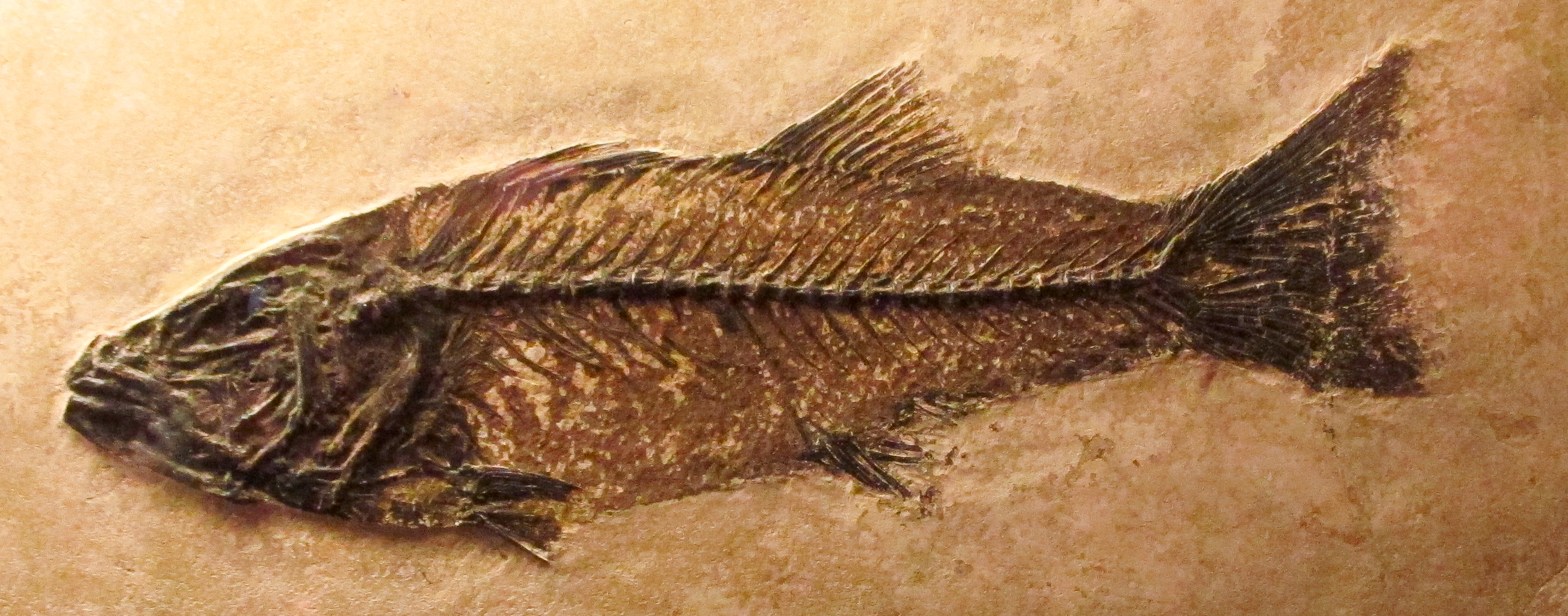
- Fossilized skeleton of the Eocene perch relative Mioplosus
  †Mioplosus
- †Miospermophilus
  - †Miospermophilus wyomingensis
- †Miotapirus
  - †Miotapirus harrisonensis – type locality for species
- †Miotylopus
  - †Miotylopus gibbi
  - †Miotylopus leonardi
  - †Miotylopus taylori – type locality for species
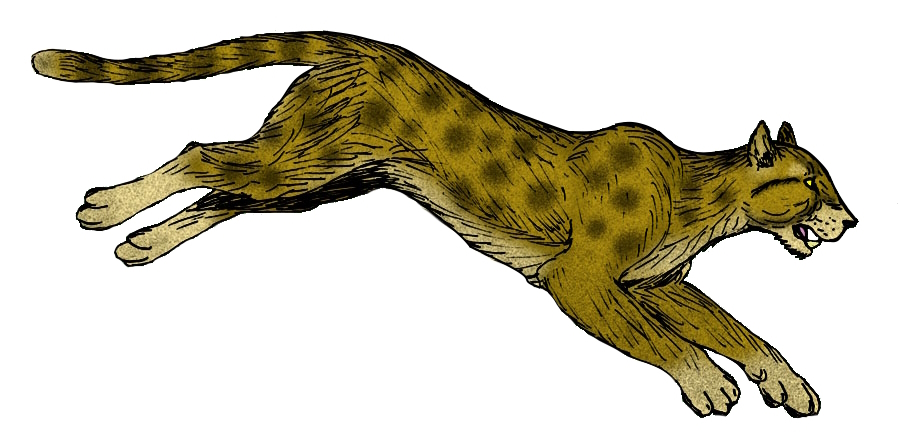
- Restoration of the Pliocene-Pleistocene Miracinonyx, or American cheetah
  †Miracinonyx
  - †Miracinonyx studeri
- †Mithrandir
  - †Mithrandir gillianus
- †Mitostylus
  - †Mitostylus seculorum – type locality for species
- †Mixodectes
  - †Mixodectes malaris
- Mnemosyne
  - †Mnemosyne terrentula – type locality for species
- †Mojavemys
  - †Mojavemys magnumarcus
- †Monosaulax
  - †Monosaulax curtus – or unidentified comparable form
- †Moropus
  - †Moropus hollandi
- Morus
  - †Morus montanensis
- †Musophyllum
  - †Musophyllum complicatum
- Mustela
  - †Mustela americana
  - †Mustela nigripes
- Mycetobia – tentative report
  - †Mycetobia terricola – type locality for species
- †Mylanodon – type locality for genus
  - †Mylanodon rosei – type locality for species
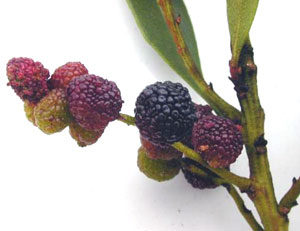
- Fruit of a living Myrica, or firetree
  Myrica
  - †Myrica lamarensis
  - †Myrica scottii
  - †Myrica wardii
- †Myrmecoboides
  - †Myrmecoboides montanensis
- Myrmica
- †Myrtophyllum
  - †Myrtophyllum torreyi
- †Mysops
  - †Mysops fraternus
  - †Mysops minimus – type locality for species
  - †Mysops parvus – type locality for species
- †Mytonolagus
  - †Mytonolagus petersoni
  - †Mytonolagus wyomingensis – type locality for species
- †Mytonomys
  - †Mytonomys coloradensis
  - †Mytonomys wortmani

== N ==
- †Namatomys
  - †Namatomys erythrus – type locality for species
  - †Namatomys lloydi
- †Nannodectes
  - †Nannodectes gazini – type locality for species
  - †Nannodectes gidleyi
  - †Nannodectes intermedius – type locality for species
  - †Nannodectes simpsoni – type locality for species
- †Nanodelphys
  - †Nanodelphys hunti
- †Nanomomys
  - †Nanomomys thermophilus
- †Nanotragulus
  - †Nanotragulus loomisi – type locality for species
  - †Nanotragulus ordinatus
- †Naocephalus – type locality for genus
  - †Naocephalus porrectus – type locality for species
- †Navajovius
  - †Navajovius kohlhaasae
- †Neanis
  - †Neanis schucherti
- †Necrocydnus
  - †Necrocydnus gosiutensis – type locality for species
- †Necygonus – type locality for genus
  - †Necygonus rotundatus – type locality for species
- †Nelumbago
  - †Nelumbago montanum
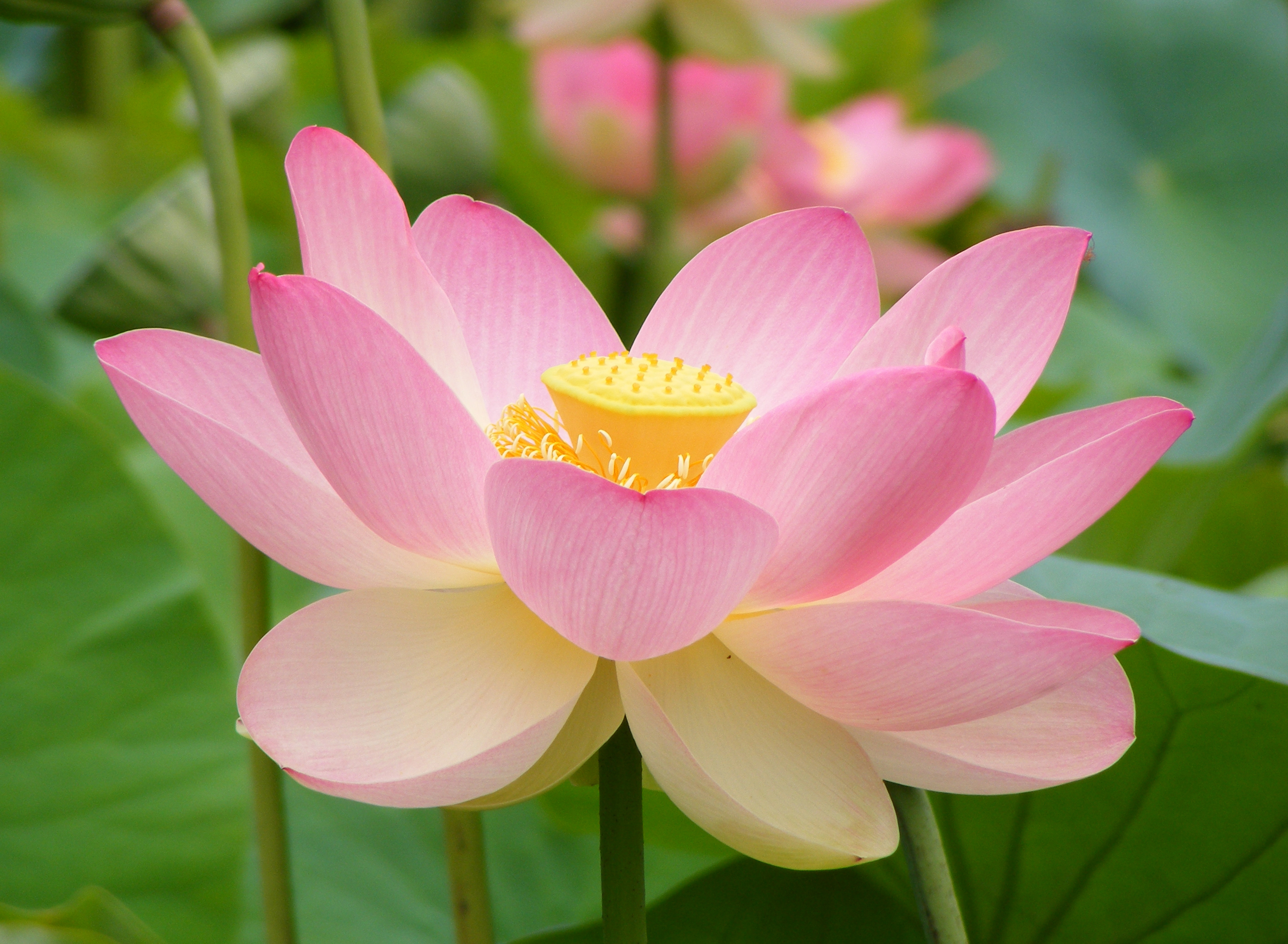
- A living Nelumbo lotus
  †Nelumbo
- †Neocathartes
  - †Neocathartes grallator
- †Neodiacodexis
  - †Neodiacodexis emryi
- †Neoliotomus
  - †Neoliotomus conventus
  - †Neoliotomus ultimus
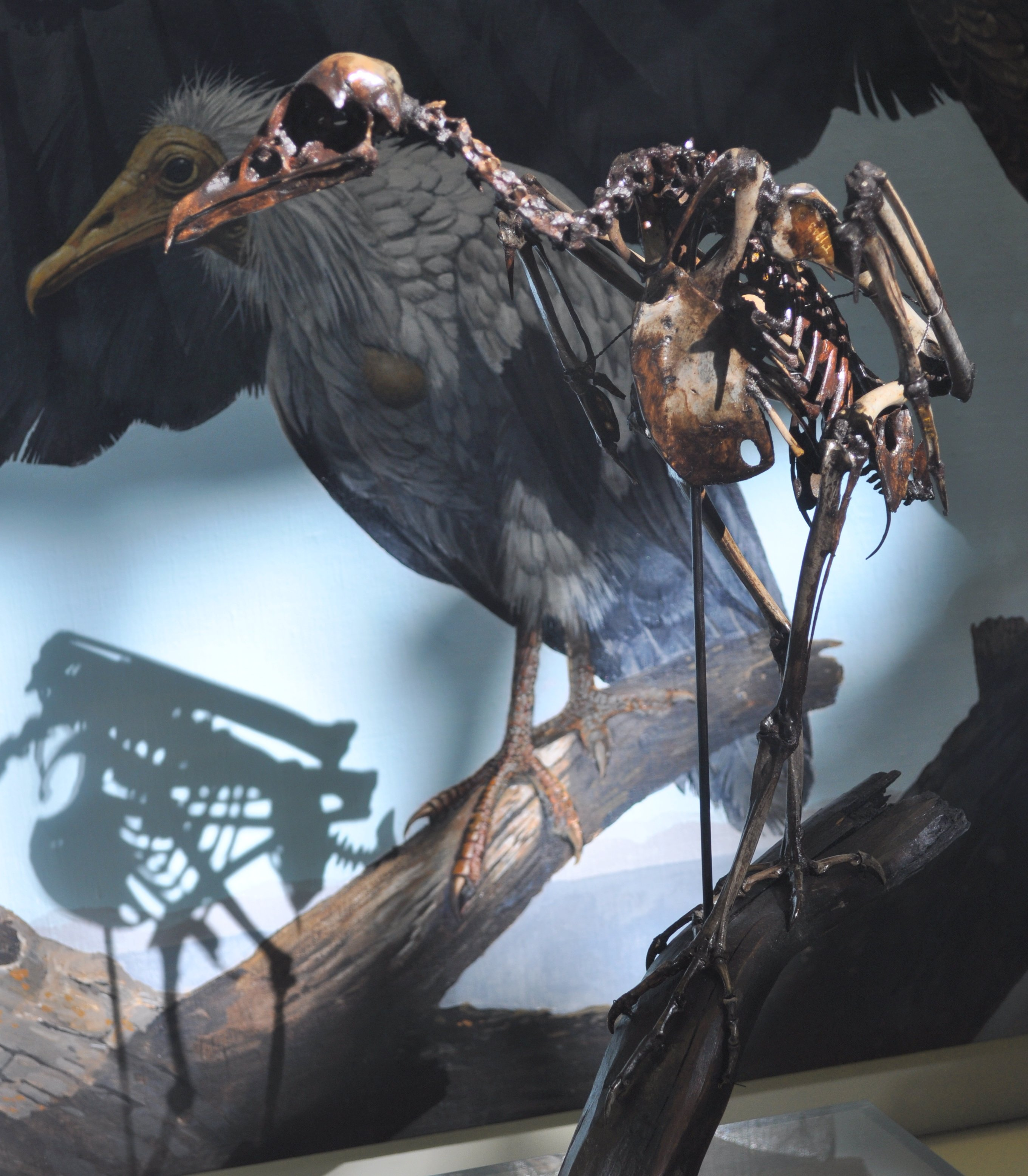
- Mounted fossilized skeleton of the Miocene Neophrontops
  Neophrontops
  - †Neophrontops americana
  - †Neophrontops americanus
- †Neoplagiaulax
  - †Neoplagiaulax grangeri – tentative report
  - †Neoplagiaulax hunteri
  - †Neoplagiaulax jepi – type locality for species
  - †Neoplagiaulax mckennai – type locality for species
  - †Neoplagiaulax nelsoni
- †Neothanes
  - †Neothanes testeus – type locality for species
- Neotoma
- †Neovulpavus
  - †Neovulpavus washakius
- †Nexuotapirus
  - †Nexuotapirus marslandensis
- †Niglarodon
- †Niptomomys
  - †Niptomomys doreenae
  - †Niptomomys favorum – type locality for species
  - †Niptomomys thelmae
- †Nonomys
  - †Nonomys simplicidens
- †Nordenskioldia
  - †Nordenskioldia borealis
- †Nosodendron
  - †Nosodendron tritavum – type locality for species
- †Notharctus
  - †Notharctus robinsoni – type locality for species
  - †Notharctus robustior
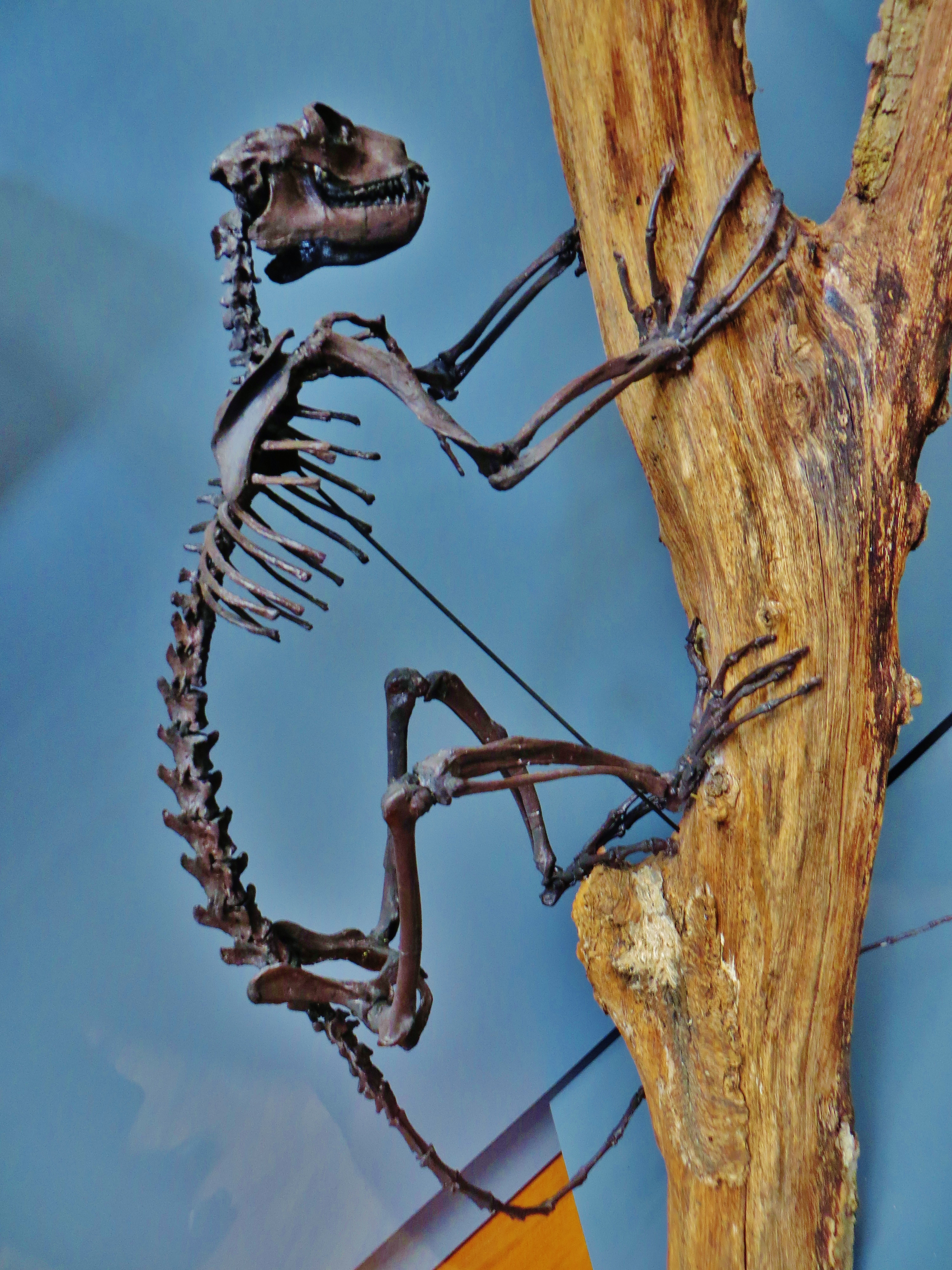
  - Mounted fossilized skeleton of the Eocene primate Notharctus tenebrosus
    †Notharctus tenebrosus – type locality for species
  - †Notharctus venticolus
- †Notogoneus
- †Notomorpha – type locality for genus
  - †Notomorpha garmanii – type locality for species
  - †Notomorpha gravis – type locality for species
  - †Notomorpha testudinea – type locality for species
- †Notoparamys – tentative report
  - †Notoparamys blochi – type locality for species
- †Nototamias – or unidentified comparable form
- †Nucifraga
  - †Nucifraga columbiana
- Numenius
  - †Numenius americanus
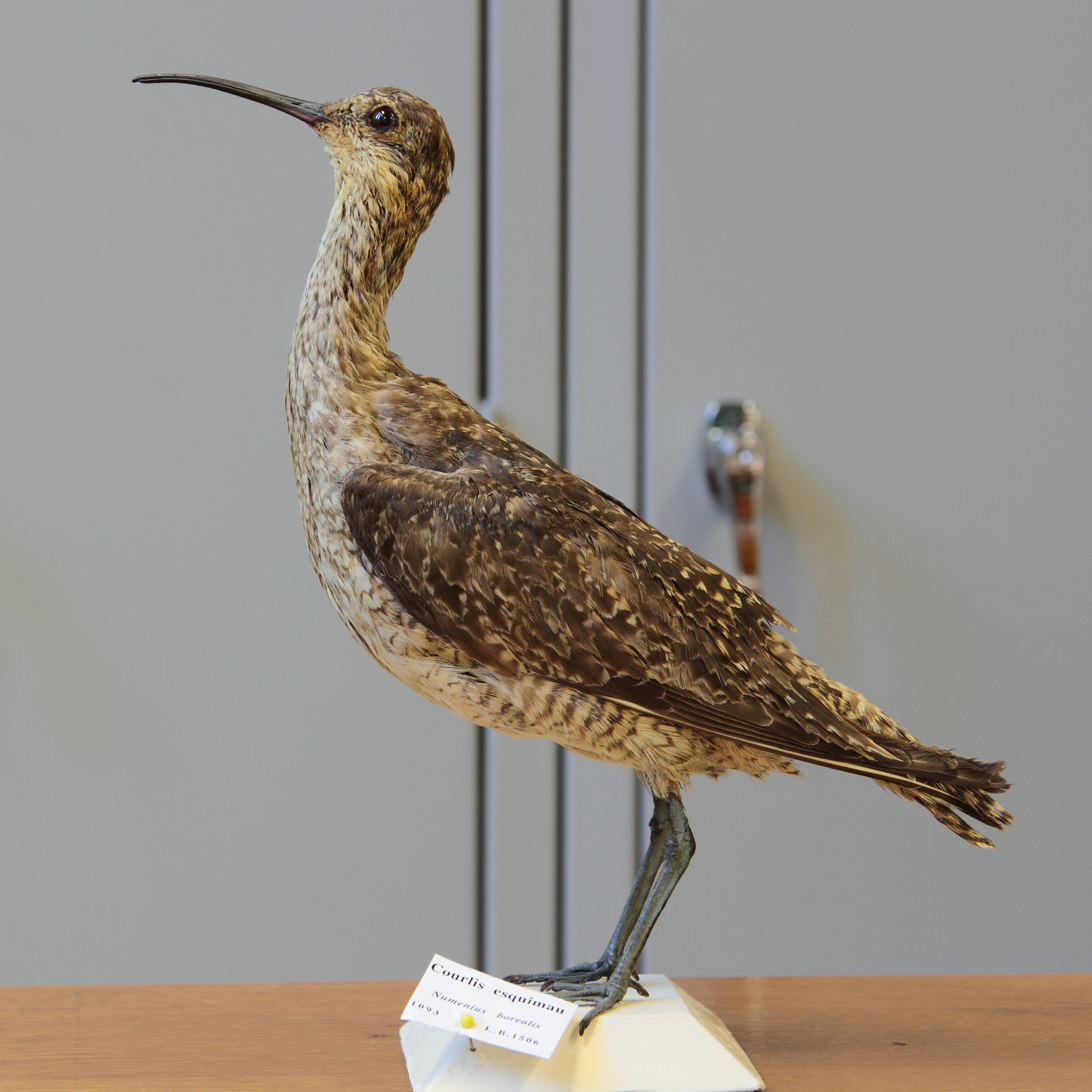
  - A taxidermied Numenius borealis, or Eskimo curlew
    †Numenius borealis
- †Nyctea
  - †Nyctea scandiaca
- †Nyctitherium
  - †Nyctitherium christopheri
  - †Nyctitherium gunnelli – type locality for species
  - †Nyctitherium serotinum – type locality for species
  - †Nyctitherium velox
- †Nyssa
  - †Nyssa alata
  - †Nyssa borealis

== O ==
- Ochotona
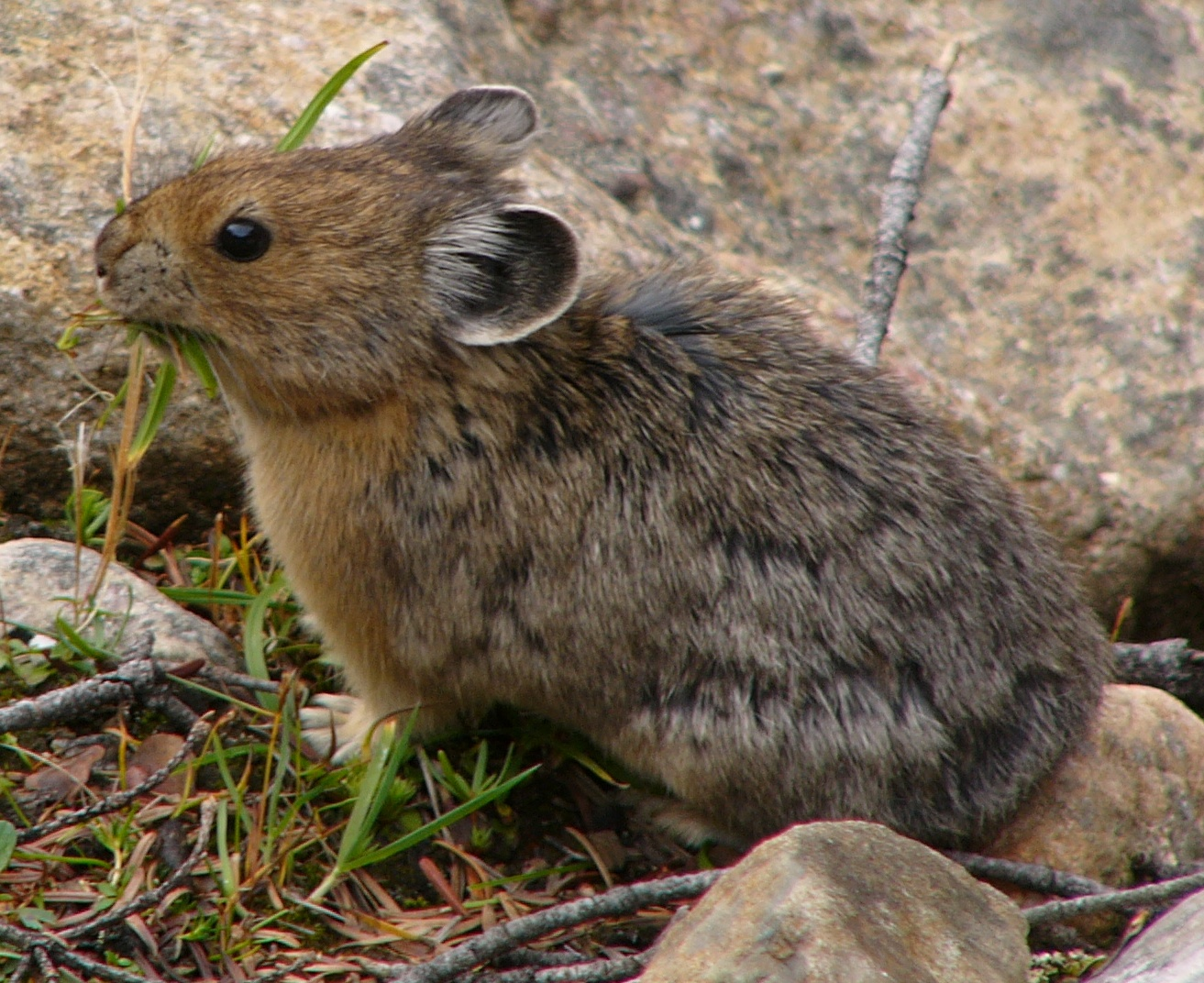
  - A living Ochotona princeps, or American pika
    †Ochotona princeps
- Ocotea
  - †Ocotea coloradensis
  - †Ocotea FW03 informal
- †Odaxosaurus
  - †Odaxosaurus jepseni – or unidentified comparable form
  - †Odaxosaurus piger
- †Ogmophis
  - †Ogmophis microcompactus – or unidentified comparable form
  - †Ogmophis voorhiesi
- †Oligodontosaurus – type locality for genus
  - †Oligodontosaurus wyomingensis – type locality for species
- †Oligoryctes
  - †Oligoryctes altitalonidus
  - †Oligoryctes cameronensis
- †Oligoscalops – tentative report
- †Oligospermophilus
- †Oligotheriomys
  - †Oligotheriomys senrudi
- †Oliveremys
  - †Oliveremys uintaensis – type locality for species
- †Omalodiscus
- †Omomys
  - †Omomys carteri
  - †Omomys lloydi
- Ondatra
  - †Ondatra meadensis
- †Onoclea
  - †Onoclea hesperia
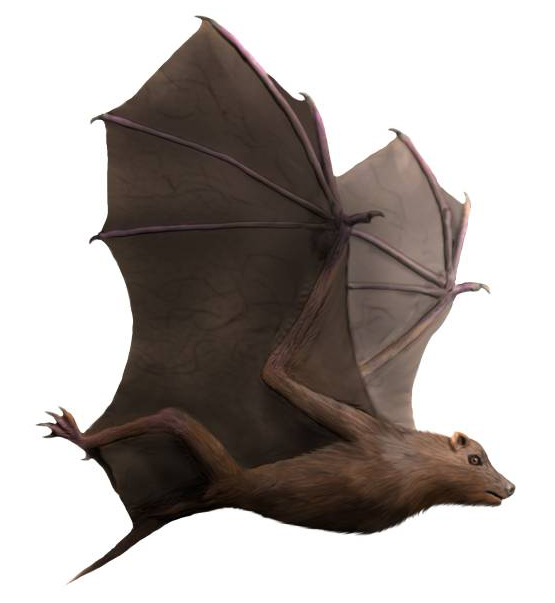
- Restoration of the Eocene bat Onychonycteris
  †Onychonycteris – type locality for genus
  - †Onychonycteris finneyi – type locality for species
- †Oodectes
  - †Oodectes herpestoides – type locality for species
  - †Oodectes jepseni
- Ophryastes
  - †Ophryastes compactus – type locality for species
- †Opisthotriton
  - †Opisthotriton kayi
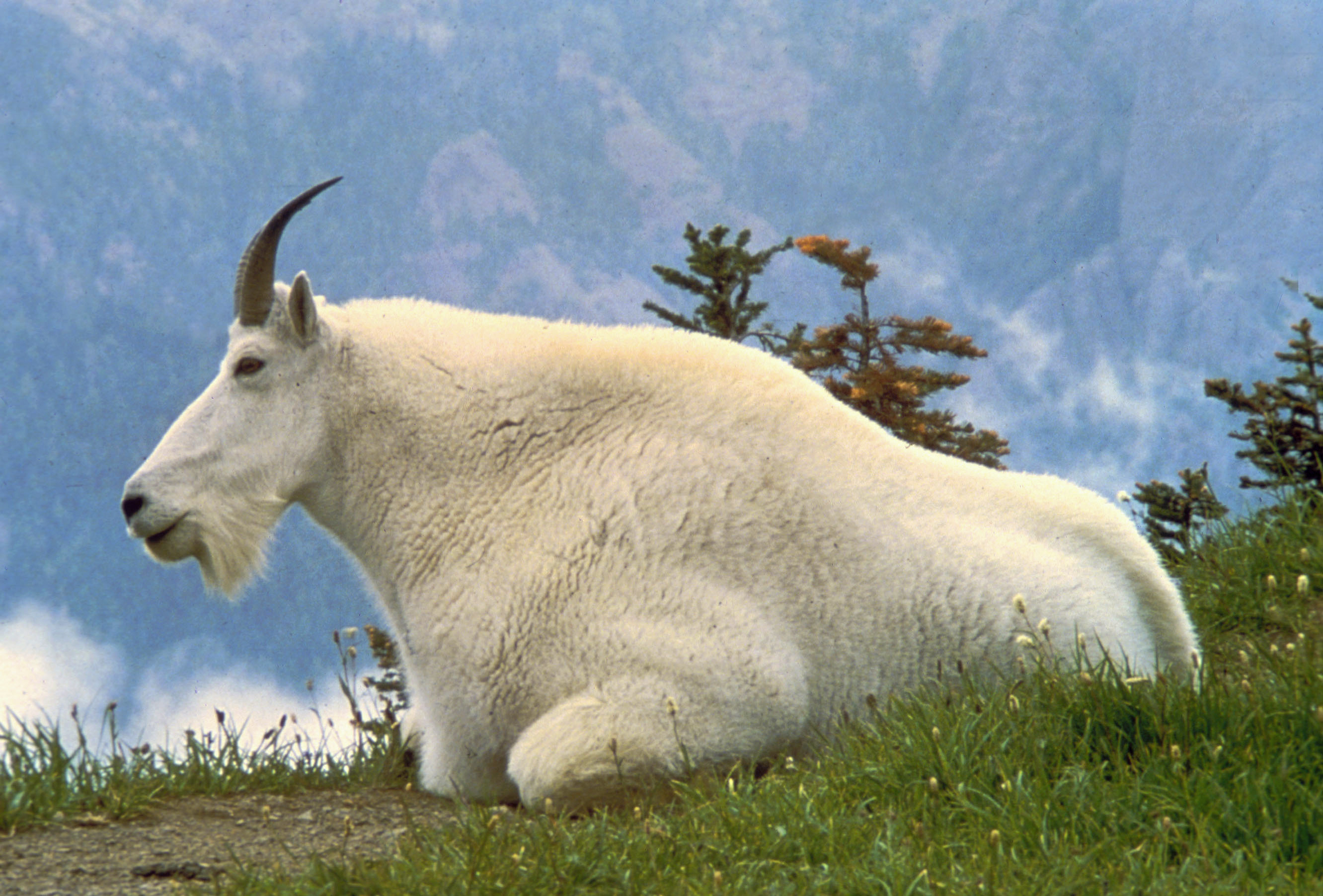
- A living Oreamnos, or mountain goat
  Oreamnos
- †Oreoconus
- †Oreodontoides
  - †Oreodontoides oregonensis
- Oreohelix
  - †Oreohelix megarche
- †Oreolagus
  - †Oreolagus colteri
  - †Oreolagus nebrascensis
- †Oreopanax
  - †Oreopanax elongatum
- †Ormiscus
  - †Ormiscus partitus – type locality for species
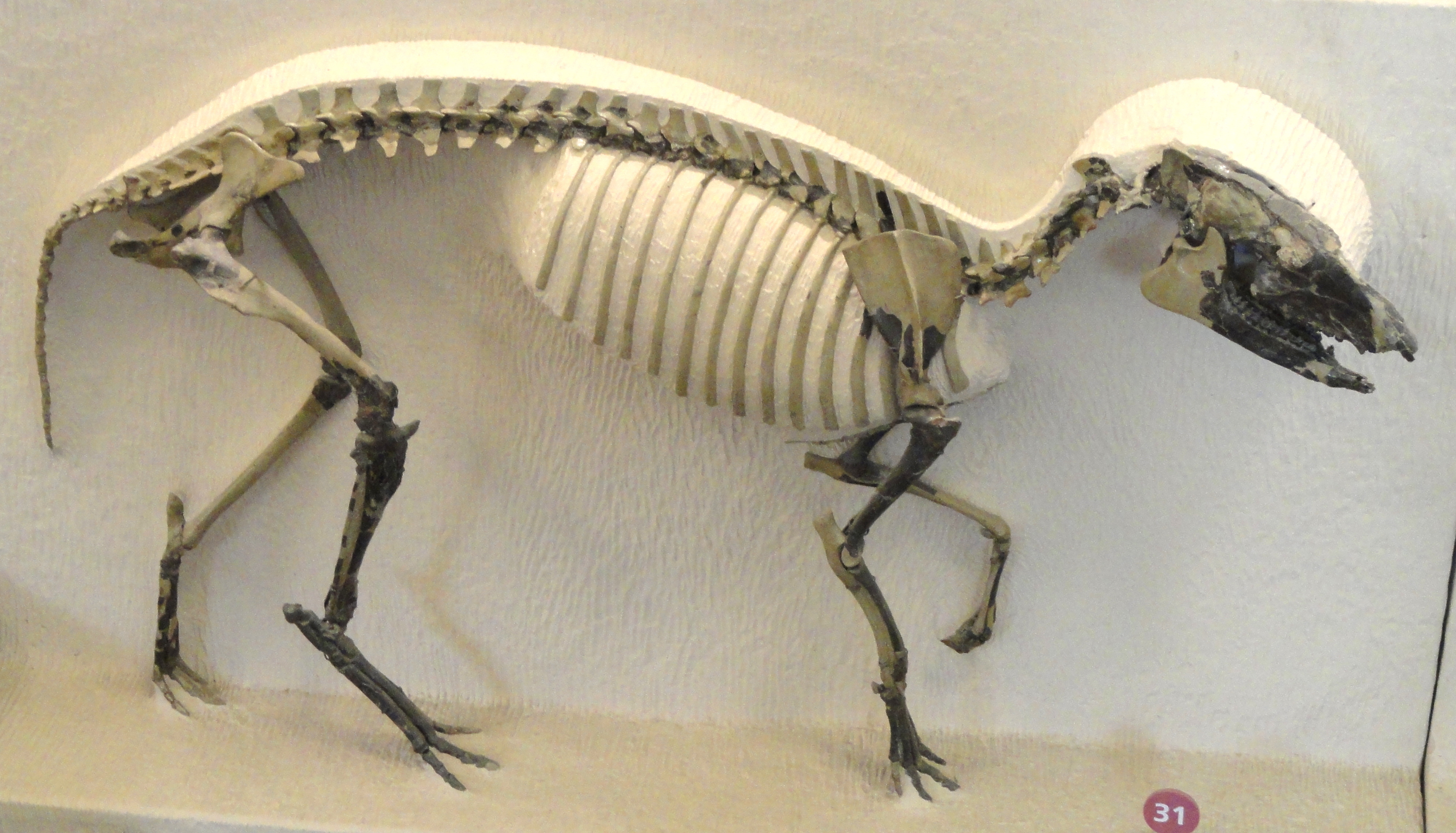
- Mounted fossilized skeleton of the Eocene horse Orohippus
  †Orohippus
  - †Orohippus major – type locality for species
  - †Orohippus proteros
  - †Orohippus pumilus – type locality for species
  - †Orohippus sylvaticus
- †Orthogenysuchus – type locality for genus
  - †Orthogenysuchus olseni – type locality for species
- †Osbornodon
  - †Osbornodon brachypus – type locality for species
- †Osmanthus
  - †Osmanthus praemissa
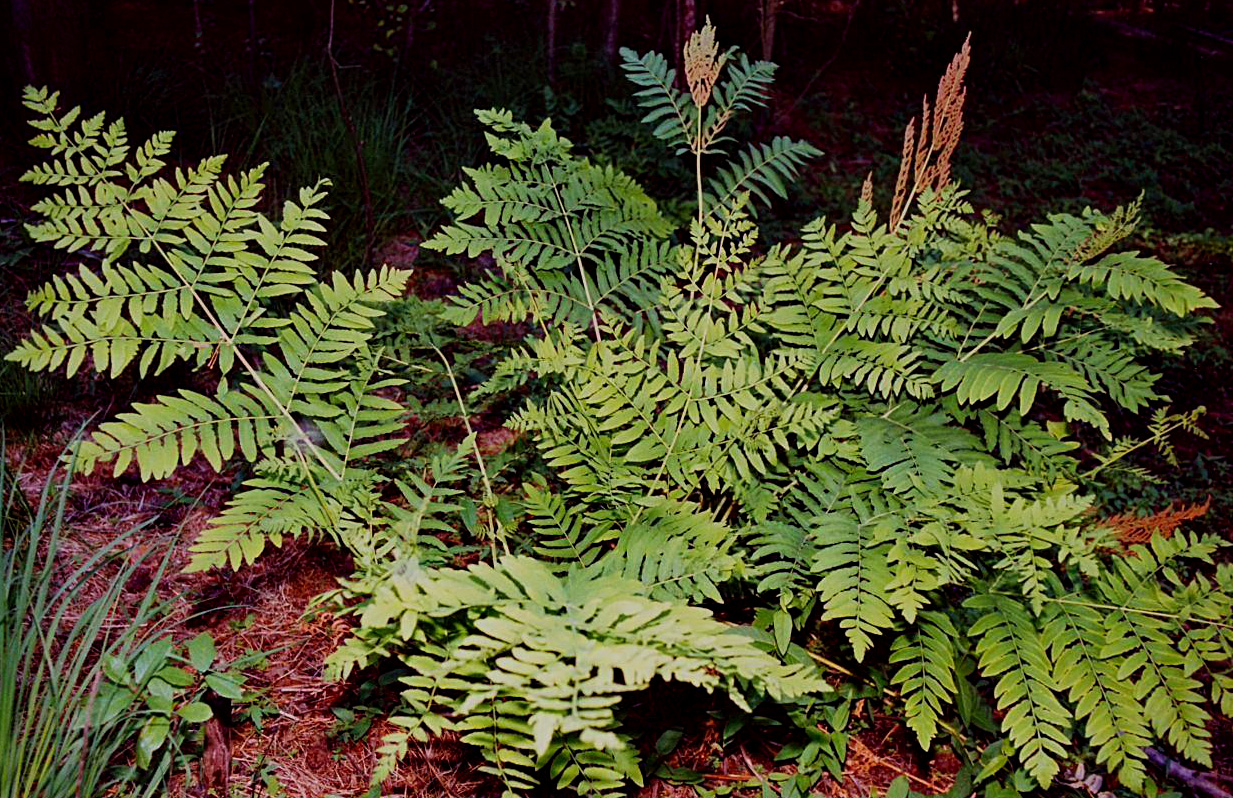
- Living Osmunda ferns
  †Osmunda
  - †Osmunda affinis
- †Osmundacidites
- †Otarocyon
  - †Otarocyon cooki
- †Otiorhynchites
  - †Otiorhynchites fossilis – type locality for species
  - †Otiorhynchites tysoni
- †Otiorhynchus
  - †Otiorhynchus dubius – type locality for species
  - †Otiorhynchus perditus – type locality for species
- †Ototriton – type locality for genus
  - †Ototriton solidus – type locality for species
- †Ourayia
  - †Ourayia hopsoni
  - †Ourayia uintensis
- Ovis
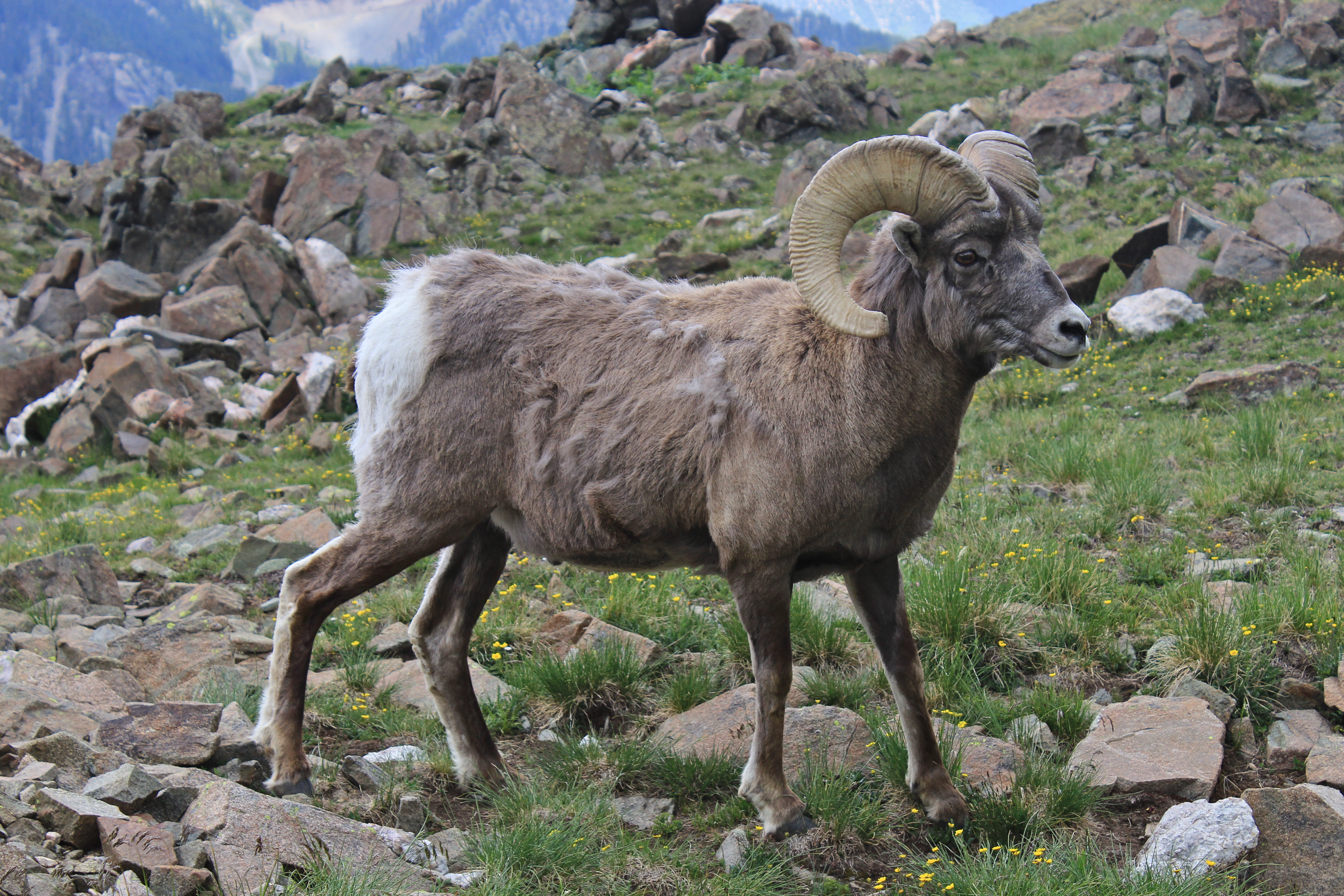
  - A living Ovis canadensis, or bighorn sheep
    †Ovis canadensis
- †Oxyacodon
  - †Oxyacodon agapetillus
  - †Oxyacodon apiculatus
  - †Oxyacodon priscilla
- †Oxyaena
  - †Oxyaena forcipata
  - †Oxyaena gulo
  - †Oxyaena intermedia
  - †Oxyaena lupina
- †Oxyclaenus
  - †Oxyclaenus cuspidatus
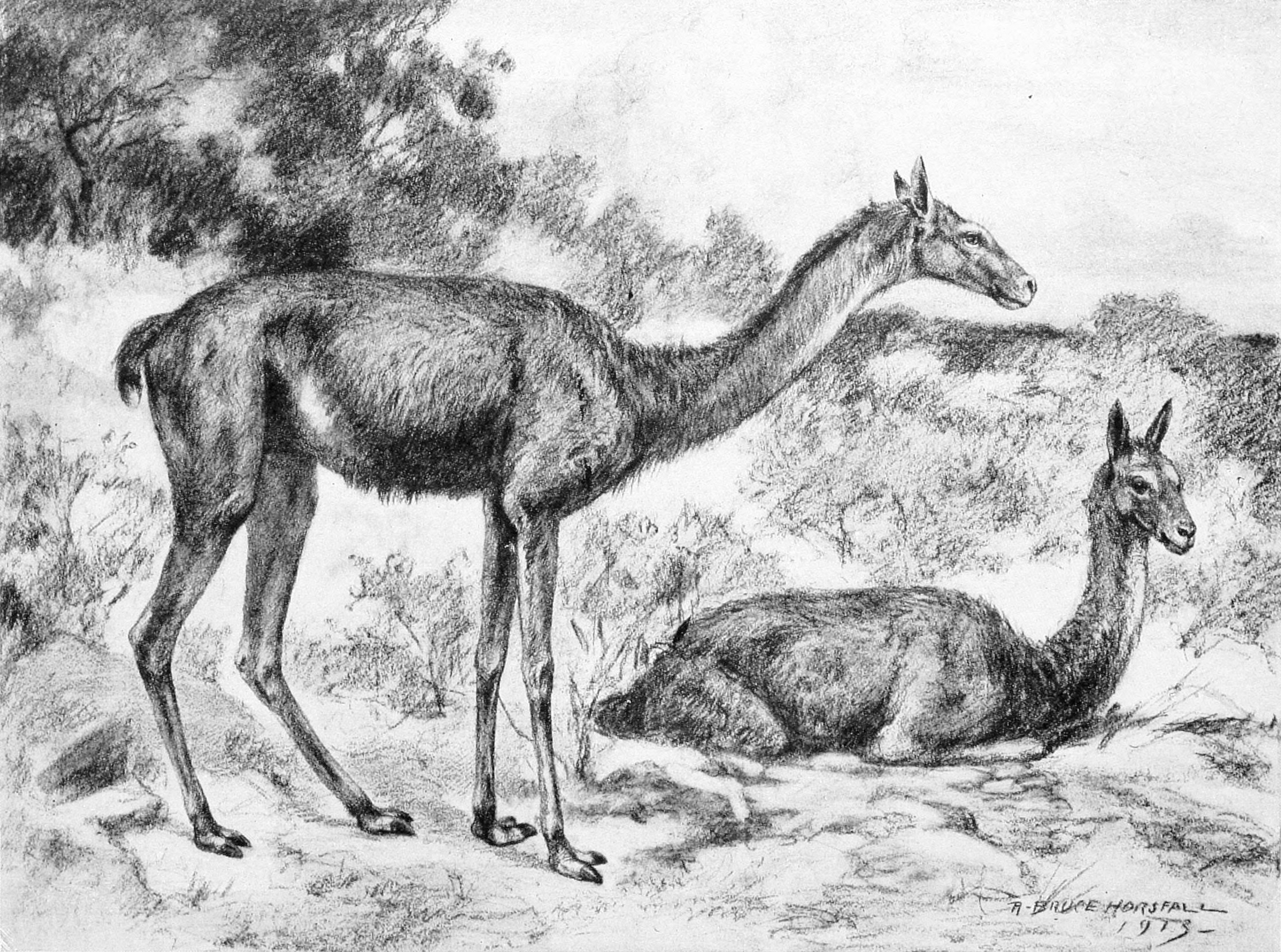
- Life restoration of a pair of the Oligocene-Miocene camel Oxydactylus. Robert Bruce Horsfall (1913).
  †Oxydactylus
  - †Oxydactylus longipes – or unidentified comparable form
  - †Oxydactylus lulli – type locality for species
  - †Oxydactylus wyomingensis
- †Oxyprimus
  - †Oxyprimus galadrielae – type locality for species
  - †Oxyprimus putorius

== P ==
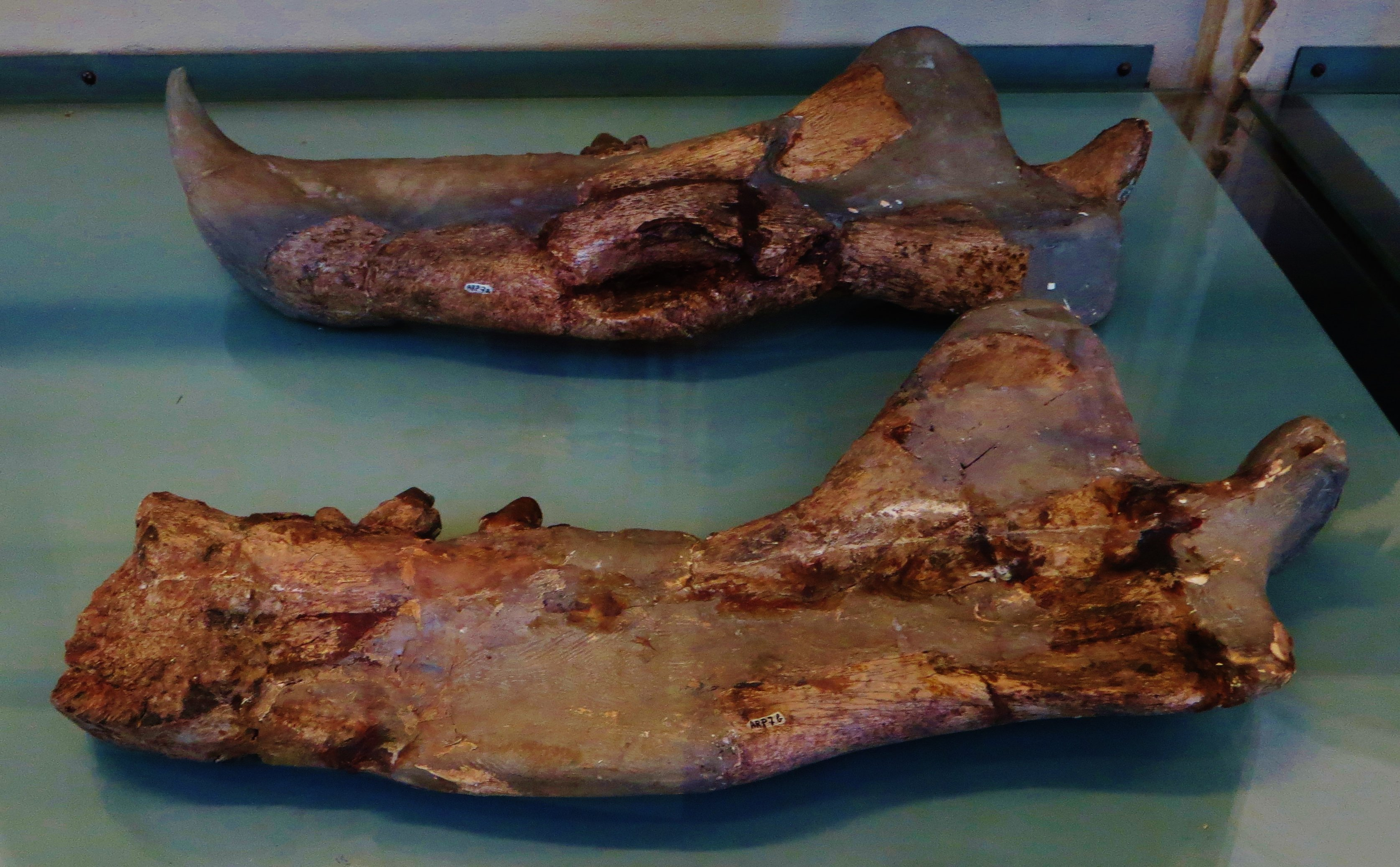
- Fossilized mandibles of the Paleocene-Eocene mesonychian mammal Pachyaena
  †Pachyaena
  - †Pachyaena gigantea
  - †Pachyaena gracilis
  - †Pachyaena ossifraga
- Pachycondyla
  - †Pachycondyla labandeirai – type locality for species
- †Pachylobius
  - †Pachylobius compressus
- †Palaeanodon
  - †Palaeanodon ignavus
  - †Palaeanodon Ignavus
  - †Palaeanodon nievelti
  - †Palaeanodon parvulus – tentative report
- †Palaearctonyx
  - †Palaearctonyx meadi – type locality for species
- †Palaechthon
  - †Palaechthon alticuspis – or unidentified comparable form
  - †Palaechthon woodi
- †Palaeictops
  - †Palaeictops bicuspis
  - †Palaeictops bridgeri
  - †Palaeictops multicuspis
- †Palaeocarpinus
  - †Palaeocarpinus aspinosa
- †Palaeocarya
  - †Palaeocarya clarnensis
- †Palaeogale
  - †Palaeogale sanguinarius
  - †Palaeogale sectoria
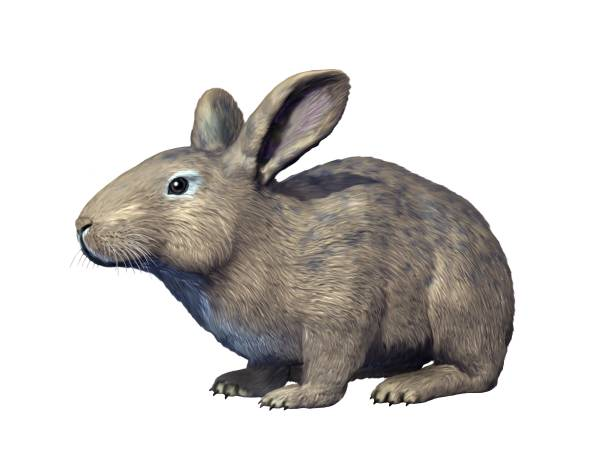
- Restoration of the Oligocene rabbit relative Palaeolagus
  †Palaeolagus
  - †Palaeolagus burkei
  - †Palaeolagus haydeni
  - †Palaeolagus hypsodus – type locality for species
  - †Palaeolagus intermedius
  - †Palaeolagus philoi
  - †Palaeolagus primus – type locality for species
  - †Palaeolagus temnodon
- †Palaeonictis
  - †Palaeonictis occidentalis
  - †Palaeonictis peloria – type locality for species
  - †Palaeonictis wingi – type locality for species
- †Palaeophasianus – type locality for genus
  - †Palaeophasianus meleagroides – type locality for species
- †Palaeorallus – type locality for genus
  - †Palaeorallus troxelli – type locality for species
- †Palaeoryctes
  - †Palaeoryctes cruoris – type locality for species
  - †Palaeoryctes puercensis
  - †Palaeoryctes punctatus
- †Palaeosinomenium – or unidentified comparable form
  - †Palaeosinomenium venablesii
- †Palaeosinopa
  - †Palaeosinopa didelphoides
  - †Palaeosinopa dorri – type locality for species
  - †Palaeosinopa incerta – type locality for species
  - †Palaeosinopa lacus – type locality for species
  - †Palaeosinopa lutreola
  - †Palaeosinopa veterrima
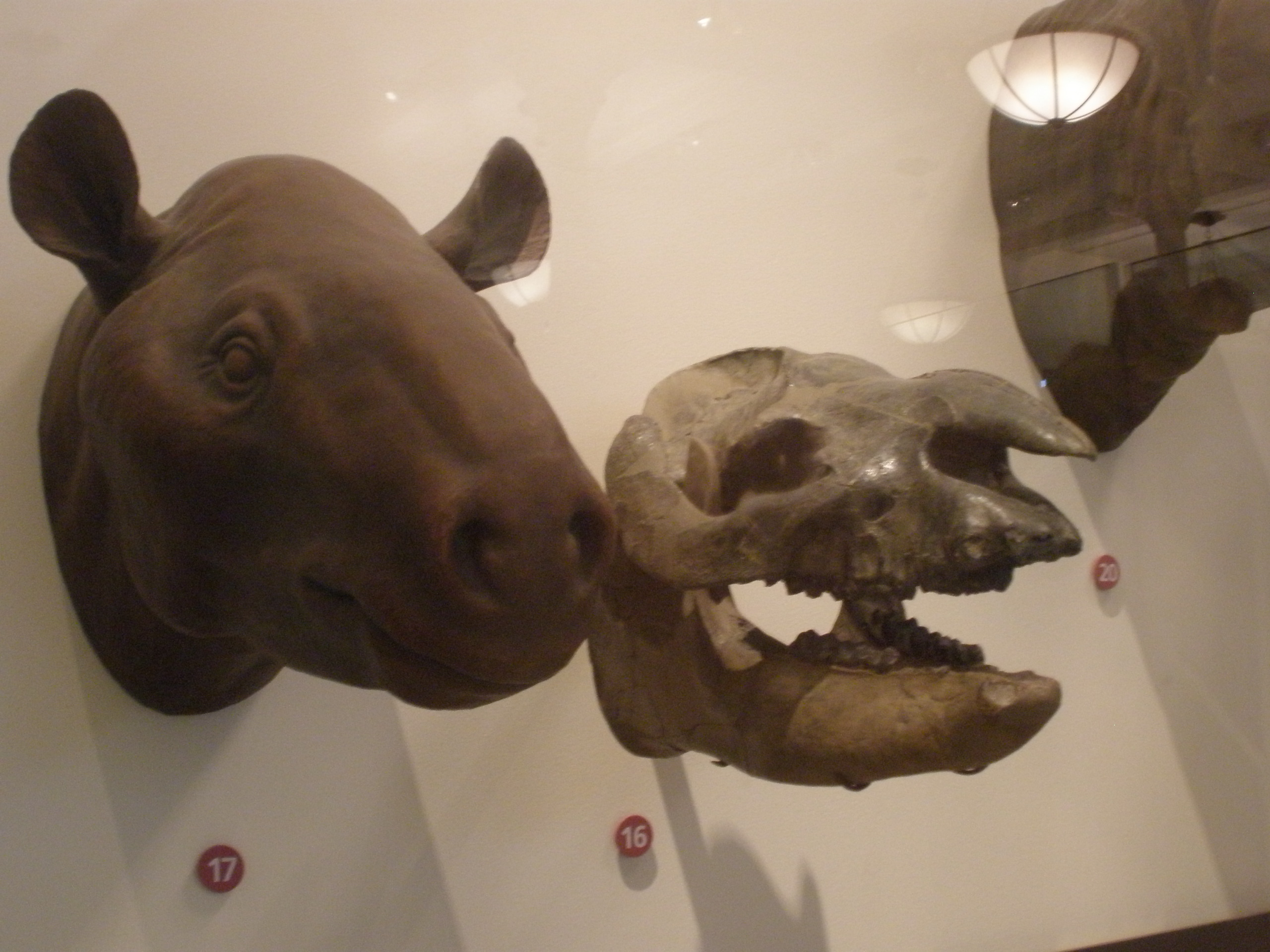
- Restorative model and fossilized skull of the Eocene brontothere mammal Palaeosyops
  †Palaeosyops
  - †Palaeosyops fontinalis
  - †Palaeosyops paludosus – type locality for species
  - †Palaeosyops robustus – type locality for species
- †Palaeotheca
  - †Palaeotheca terrestris – type locality for species
- †Palaeoxantusia – type locality for genus
  - †Palaeoxantusia amara – type locality for species
  - †Palaeoxantusia fera – type locality for species
- †Palatobaena – type locality for genus
  - †Palatobaena bairdi – type locality for species
  - †Palatobaena gaffneyi – type locality for species
- †Palecphora
  - †Palecphora patefacta – type locality for species
- †Palenochtha
  - †Palenochtha minor
  - †Palenochtha weissae – type locality for species
- †Paleoamphiuma – type locality for genus
  - †Paleoamphiuma tetradactylum – type locality for species
- †Paleomyrtinaea
  - †Paleomyrtinaea FW66 informal
- †Paleonelumbo
  - †Paleonelumbo macroloba
- †Paleonuphar
  - †Paleonuphar hesperium
- †Paleotomus
  - †Paleotomus carbonensis – type locality for species
  - †Paleotomus milleri – type locality for species
  - †Paleotomus radagasti
- †Palepidophyma – type locality for genus
  - †Palepidophyma lilliputiana – type locality for species
  - †Palepidophyma paradisa – type locality for species
- Paliurus
  - †Paliurus colombi
- †Palmocarpon
  - †Palmocarpon subcylindricum
- †Pandaniidites
  - †Pandaniidites radicus
- Panthera
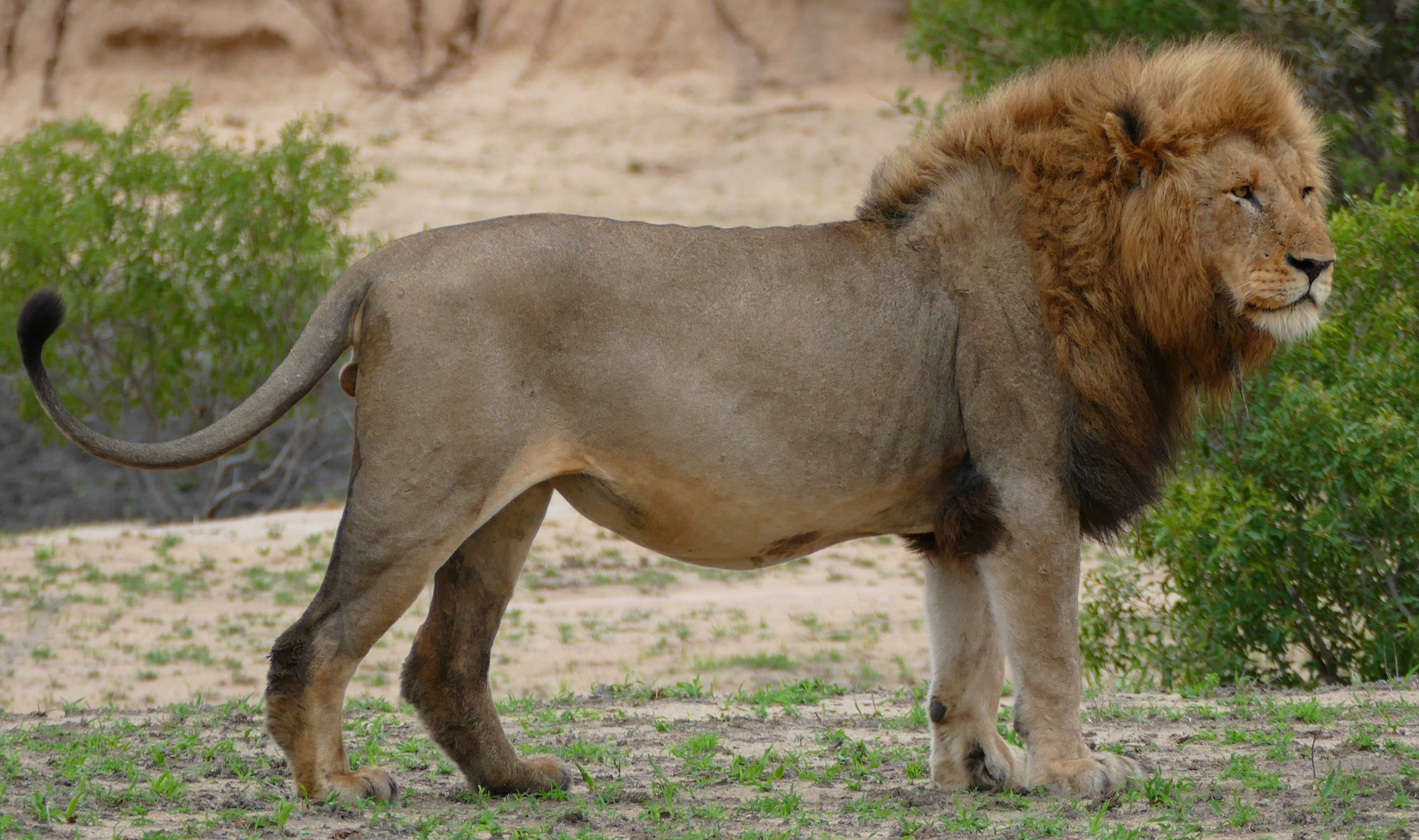
  - A living Panthera leo, or lion
    †Panthera leo
- †Pantolambda
  - †Pantolambda cavirictus
  - †Pantolambda intermedius – or unidentified comparable form
- †Pantolestes
  - †Pantolestes longieundus – type locality for species
  - †Pantolestes natans – or unidentified comparable form
- †Paracathartes
  - †Paracathartes howardae
- †Paracosoryx
  - †Paracosoryx wilsoni
- †Paracynarctus
  - †Paracynarctus kelloggi
- †Paradjidaumo
  - †Paradjidaumo hypsodus
  - †Paradjidaumo trilophus
- †Paraenhydrocyon
  - †Paraenhydrocyon josephi
  - †Paraenhydrocyon robustus
  - †Paraenhydrocyon wallovianus
- †Paraepicrates
  - †Paraepicrates brevispondylus – type locality for species
- †Paraglyptosaurus
  - †Paraglyptosaurus princeps – type locality for species
- †Parahippus
  - †Parahippus pawniensis
  - †Parahippus pristinus – tentative report
  - †Parahippus wyomingensis – type locality for species
- †Paralatindia
  - †Paralatindia saussurei – type locality for species
- †Paramerychyus
  - †Paramerychyus harrisonensis
  - †Paramerychyus relictus
- †Paramys
  - †Paramys adamus – type locality for species
  - †Paramys compressidens
  - †Paramys copei
  - †Paramys delicatior
  - †Paramys delicatus
  - †Paramys excavatus
  - †Paramys leptodus
  - †Paramys pycnus
  - †Paramys relictus
  - †Paramys taurus
- †Parandrita
  - †Parandrita vestita – type locality for species
- †Paranolis – type locality for genus
  - †Paranolis delicatus – type locality for species
- †Paranymphaea
  - †Paranymphaea crassifolia
- †Paranymphea
  - †Paranymphea crassifolia
- †Parapliosaccomys
  - †Parapliosaccomys transversus
- †Paraprionosaurus – type locality for genus
  - †Paraprionosaurus wyomingensis – type locality for species
- †Parapternodus
  - †Parapternodus antiquus – type locality for species
- †Pararyctes
  - †Pararyctes pattersoni – type locality for species
- †Parasauromalus – type locality for genus
  - †Parasauromalus olseni – type locality for species
- †Paraternstroemia
  - †Paraternstroemia hyphovenosa
- †Paratomarctus
  - †Paratomarctus temerarius
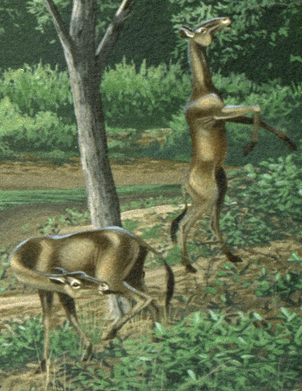
- Life restoration the Eocene-Oligocene camel Paratylopus (upper right)
  †Paratylopus
  - †Paratylopus labiatus
  - †Paratylopus primaevus
- †Parectypodus
  - †Parectypodus clemensi
  - †Parectypodus lunatus
  - †Parectypodus sinclairi
  - †Parectypodus sylviae
- †Pareumys
  - †Pareumys grangeri
- †Parictis
  - †Parictis dakotensis
  - †Parictis gilpini
  - †Parictis parvus
  - †Parictis personi
- †Paromomys
  - †Paromomys depressidens
  - †Paromomys maturus
- †Parophisaurus
  - †Parophisaurus pawneensis
- †Parvericius
  - †Parvericius montanus
- †Parvileguminophyllum
  - †Parvileguminophyllum coloradensis
- †Parvitragulus
  - †Parvitragulus priscus
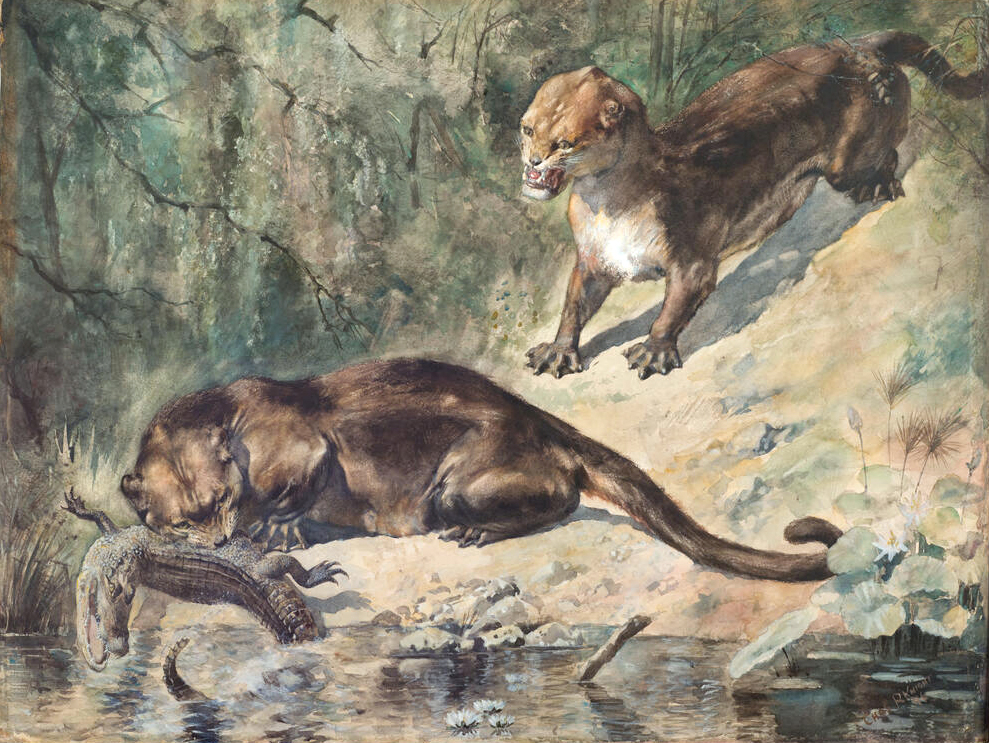
- Life restoration of the Eocene creodont mammal Patriofelis. Charles R. Knight (1896).
  †Patriofelis
  - †Patriofelis ferox – type locality for species
  - †Patriofelis ulta
- †Patriomanis
  - †Patriomanis americanus
- †Pauromys
  - †Pauromys schaubi – type locality for species
- †Peltosaurus
- †Pelycodus
- †Pelycomys
  - †Pelycomys placidus
- †Penetrigonias
  - †Penetrigonias dakotensis
- †Penosphyllum
  - †Penosphyllum cordatum
- †Pentacemylus – tentative report
- †Pentacodon
- †Pentacosmodon
  - †Pentacosmodon pronus – type locality for species
- †Peradectes
  - †Peradectes californicus
  - †Peradectes chesteri
  - †Peradectes elegans – type locality for species
  - †Peradectes protinnaminatus
  - †Peradectes protinnominatus
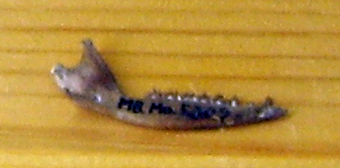
- Fossilized mandible of the Eocene-Miocene mammal Peratherium
  †Peratherium
  - †Peratherium comstocki
  - †Peratherium edwardi
  - †Peratherium marsupium
- †Perchoerus
  - †Perchoerus minor
- †Periptychus
  - †Periptychus carinidens
  - †Periptychus coarctatus
- Perognathus
  - †Perognathus furlongi
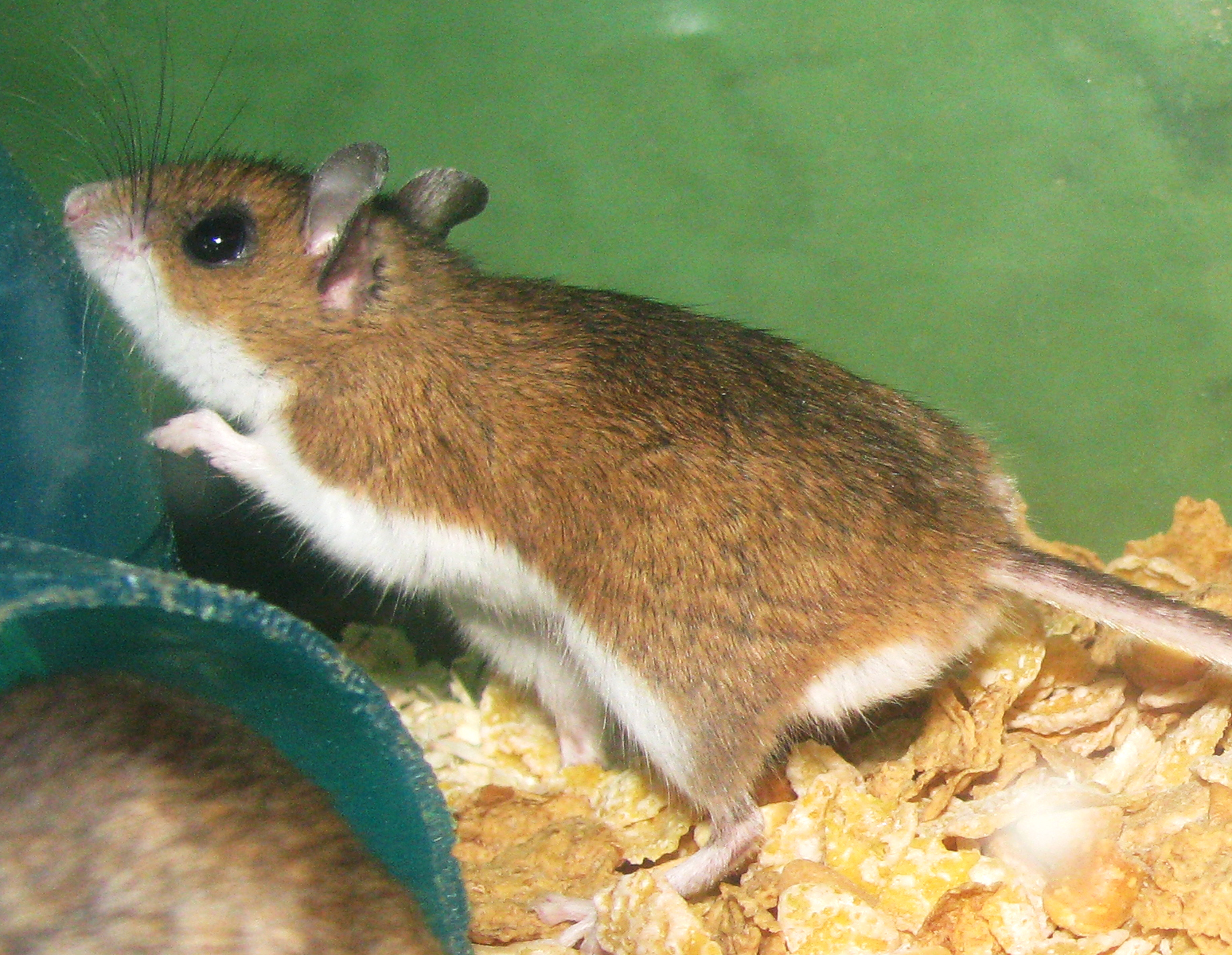
- A living Peromyscus, or deer mouse
  Peromyscus
- Persea
  - †Persea brossiana
  - †Persea coriacea – type locality for species
  - †Persea pseudocarolinensis
- †Perseoxylon
  - †Perseoxylon aromaticum
- †Persites
  - †Persites argutus
- †Petauristodon
- †Phalaenoptilus
  - †Phalaenoptilus nuttallii
- †Phareodus
  - †Phareodus encaustus
  - †Phareodus testis
- †Phenacocoelus
  - †Phenacocoelus typus
- †Phenacodaptes
  - †Phenacodaptes sabulosus – type locality for species
- †Phenacodontid
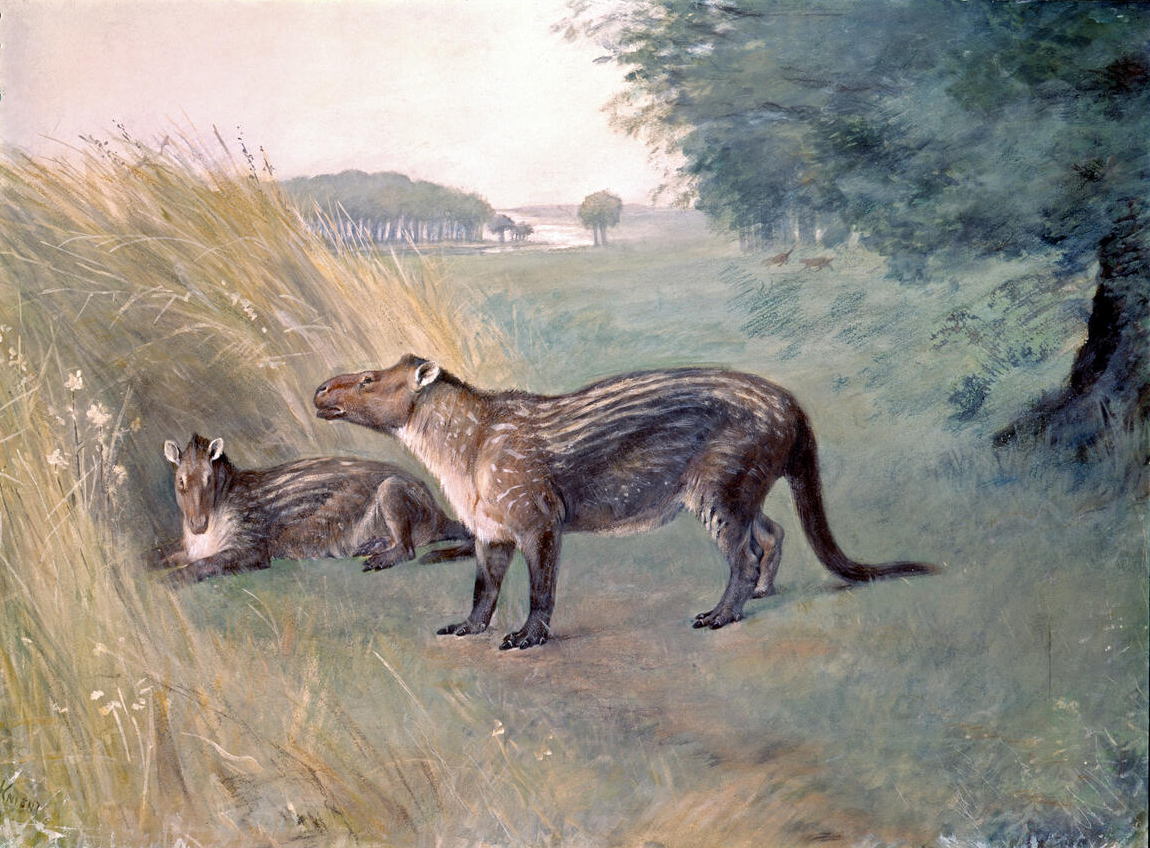
- Life restoration of the Paleocene-Eocene ungulate Phenacodus. Charles R. Knight (1898).
  †Phenacodus
  - †Phenacodus bisonensis – type locality for species
  - †Phenacodus grangeri
  - †Phenacodus intermedius
  - †Phenacodus magnus
  - †Phenacodus matthewi
  - †Phenacodus trilobatus
  - †Phenacodus vortmani
- †Phenacolemur
  - †Phenacolemur fortior – type locality for species
  - †Phenacolemur mcgrewi – type locality for species
  - †Phenacolemur praecox
  - †Phenacolemur shifrae
  - †Phenacolemur simonsi
  - †Phenacolemur cavatus – type locality for species
- Phenacomys
  - †Phenacomys longicaudus
- †Phenolia
  - †Phenolia incapax – type locality for species
- Philhydrus
- †Philodendron – or unidentified related form
  - †Philodendron RR61 informal
- †Philotrox
  - †Philotrox condoni
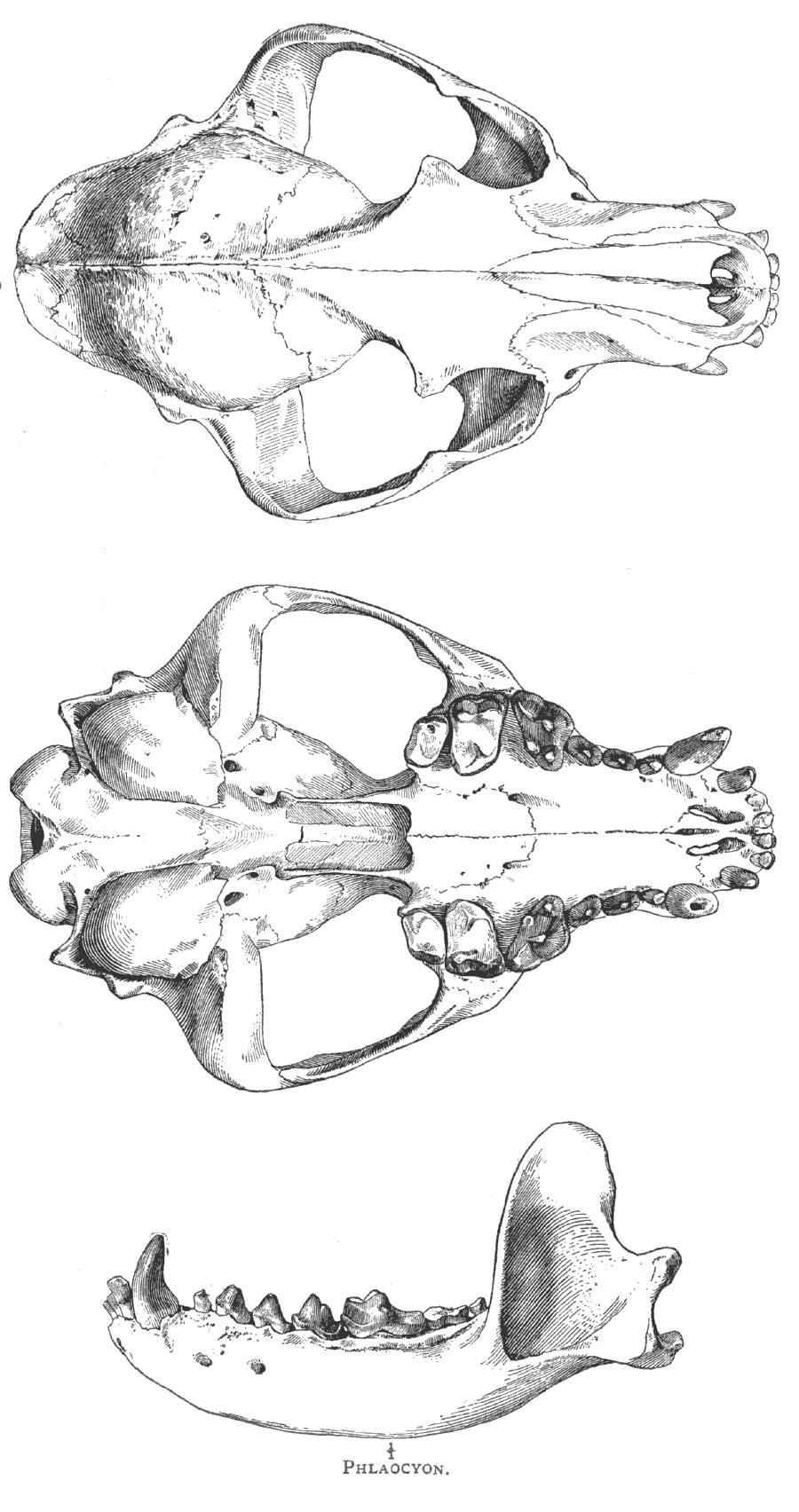
- Illustration of a fossilized skull in multiple views of the Oligocene-Miocene bone-crushing dog Phlaocyon
  †Phlaocyon
  - †Phlaocyon annectens
  - †Phlaocyon leucosteus
  - †Phlaocyon minor
  - †Phlaocyon multicuspus
- †Phoebe
- Phragmites – tentative report
  - †Phragmites latissima
- †Phyllites
  - †Phyllites crassifolia
  - †Phyllites demoresi
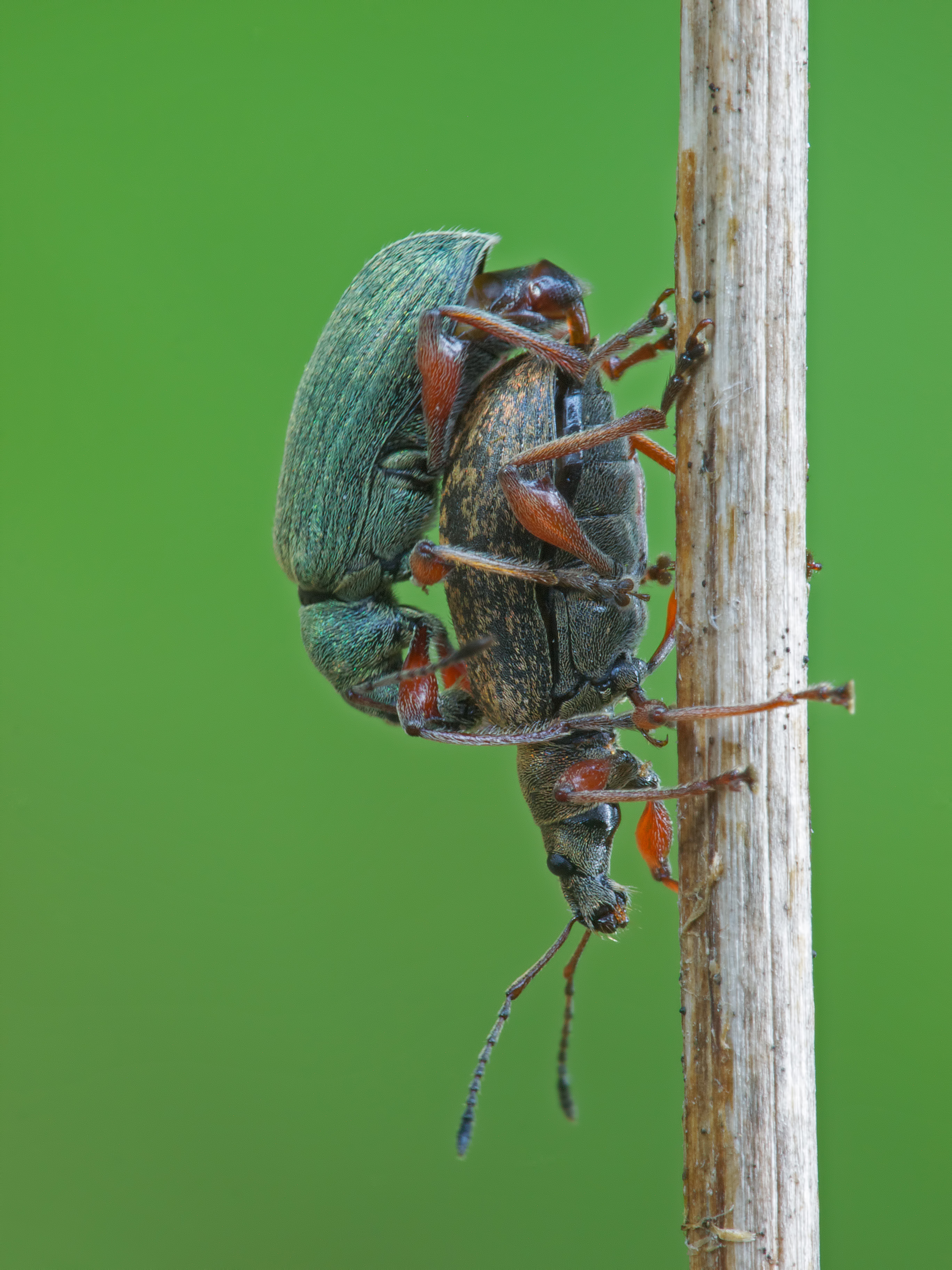
- A living Phyllobius weevil
  Phyllobius
  - †Phyllobius avus
- Physa
- Phytocrene
  - †Phytocrene sordida
- Pica
  - †Pica pica
- †Piceoerpeton – type locality for genus
  - †Piceoerpeton willwoodense – type locality for species
- †Picrodus
  - †Picrodus calgariensis
  - †Picrodus canpacius
  - †Picrodus silberlingi
- †Picromomys
  - †Picromomys petersonorum – type locality for species
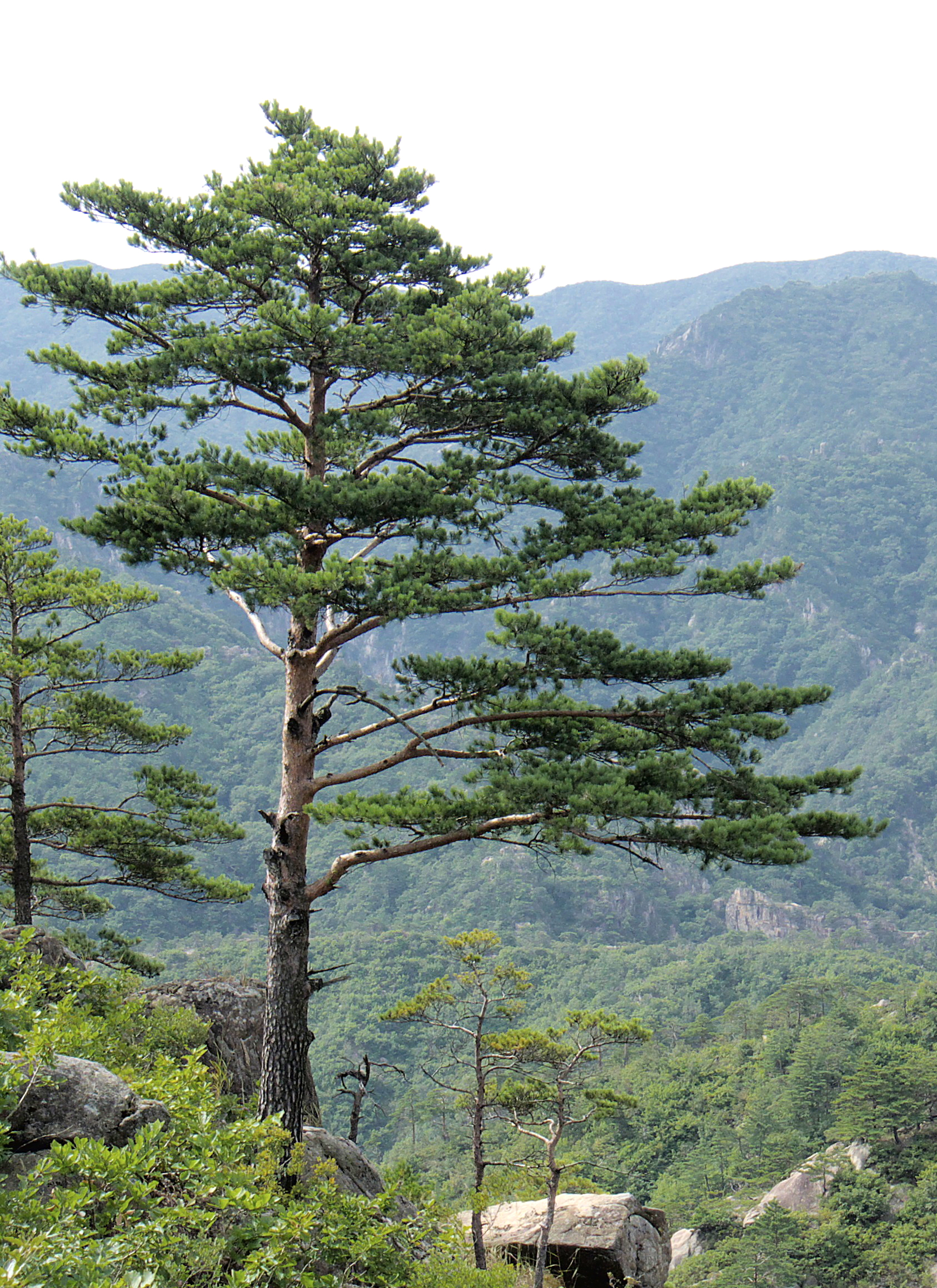
- A living Pinus, or pine tree
  Pinus
  - †Pinus balli
  - †Pinus florissanti
  - †Pinus GR542 informal
  - †Pinus gracilistrobus
  - †Pinus iddingsi
  - †Pinus Lesquereux
  - †Pinus macrolepis
  - †Pinus premurrayana
  - †Pinus wardii
- †Pipestoneomys
  - †Pipestoneomys bisulcatus – or unidentified comparable form
- Pipilo
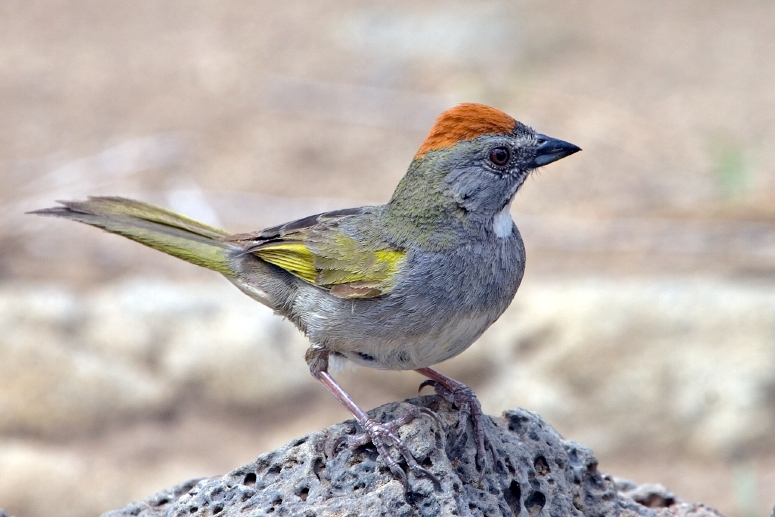
  - A living Pipilo chlorurus, or green-tailed towhee
    †Pipilo chlorurus
- †Plagioctenodon
  - †Plagioctenodon krausae
  - †Plagioctenodon rosei
  - †Plagioctenodon savagei
  - †Plagioctenodon thewisseni – type locality for species
  - †Plagioctenodon dawsonae – type locality for species
  - †Plagioctenodon goliath – type locality for species
- †Plagioctenoides
  - †Plagioctenoides microlestes – type locality for species
  - †Plagioctenoides tombowni – type locality for species
  - †Plagioctenoides cryptos – type locality for species
- †Plagiomene
  - †Plagiomene accola
  - †Plagiomene multicuspis
- †Planatus
  - †Planatus raynoldsi
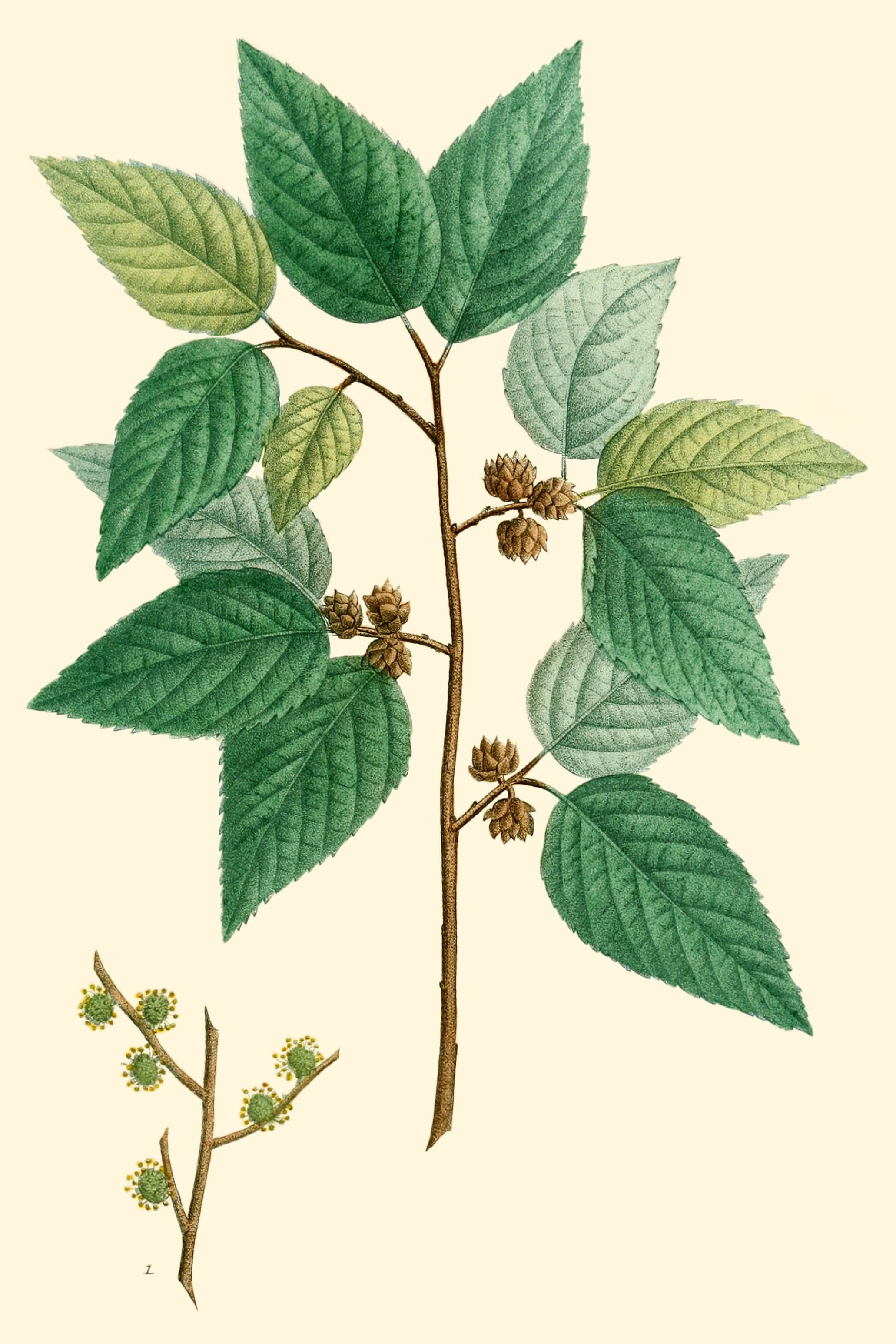
- Illustration of a branch with nuts from a Planera, or water elm tree
  †Planera
  - †Planera longifolia
- †Planetetherium
  - †Planetetherium mirabile
- †Planetochelys
  - †Planetochelys dithyros
- †Planorbina
  - †Planorbina pseudoammonius
- †Plastomenoides
  - †Plastomenoides lamberti
- †Plastomenus
  - †Plastomenus molopinus
  - †Plastomenus oedemius – type locality for species
  - †Plastomenus tantillus – type locality for species
  - †Plastomenus thomasi
  - †Plastomenus visendus – type locality for species
- †Plataninium
  - †Plataninium haydeni
- †Platanophyllum
  - †Platanophyllum whitneyi
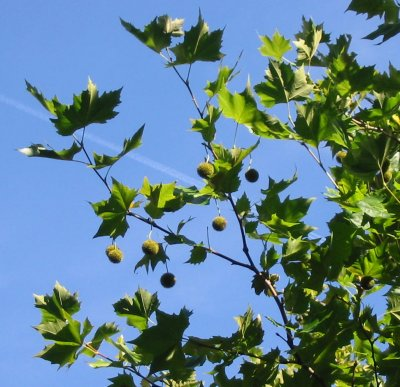
- Leaves and fruit of a living Platanus, or plane tree
  Platanus
  - †Platanus brownii
  - †Platanus GR552 informal
  - †Platanus gracilis
  - †Platanus guillelmae
  - †Platanus montana
  - †Platanus raynoldsi
  - †Platanus raynoldsii
  - †Platanus wyomingensis
- Platycarya
  - †Platycarya americana
  - †Platycarya BB09 informal
  - †Platycarya castaneopis
  - †Platycarya castaneopsis
- Platynus
  - †Platynus caesus – type locality for species
  - †Platynus senex – type locality for species
- Plecia
  - †Plecia dejecta – type locality for species
  - †Plecia pealei – type locality for species
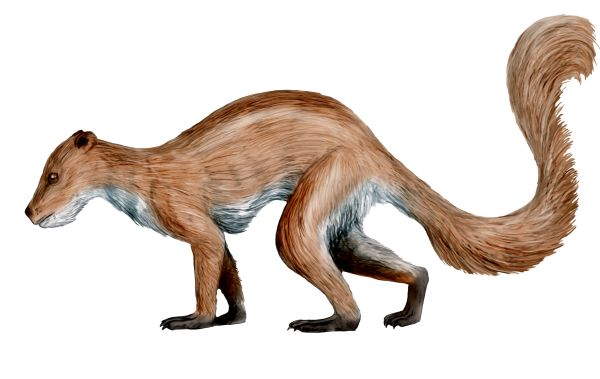
- Life restoration of the Paleocene-Eocene primate Plesiadapis
  †Plesiadapis
  - †Plesiadapis anceps – type locality for species
  - †Plesiadapis churchilli
  - †Plesiadapis cookei
  - †Plesiadapis dubius
  - †Plesiadapis fodinatus – type locality for species
  - †Plesiadapis gingerichi
  - †Plesiadapis praecursor
  - †Plesiadapis rex
  - †Plesiadapis simonsi – type locality for species
- †Plesiolestes
  - †Plesiolestes problematicus – type locality for species
- †Pliophenacomys
  - †Pliophenacomys meadensis
  - †Pliophenacomys primaevus
- †Poabromylus
  - †Poabromylus golzi
- †Poebrodon
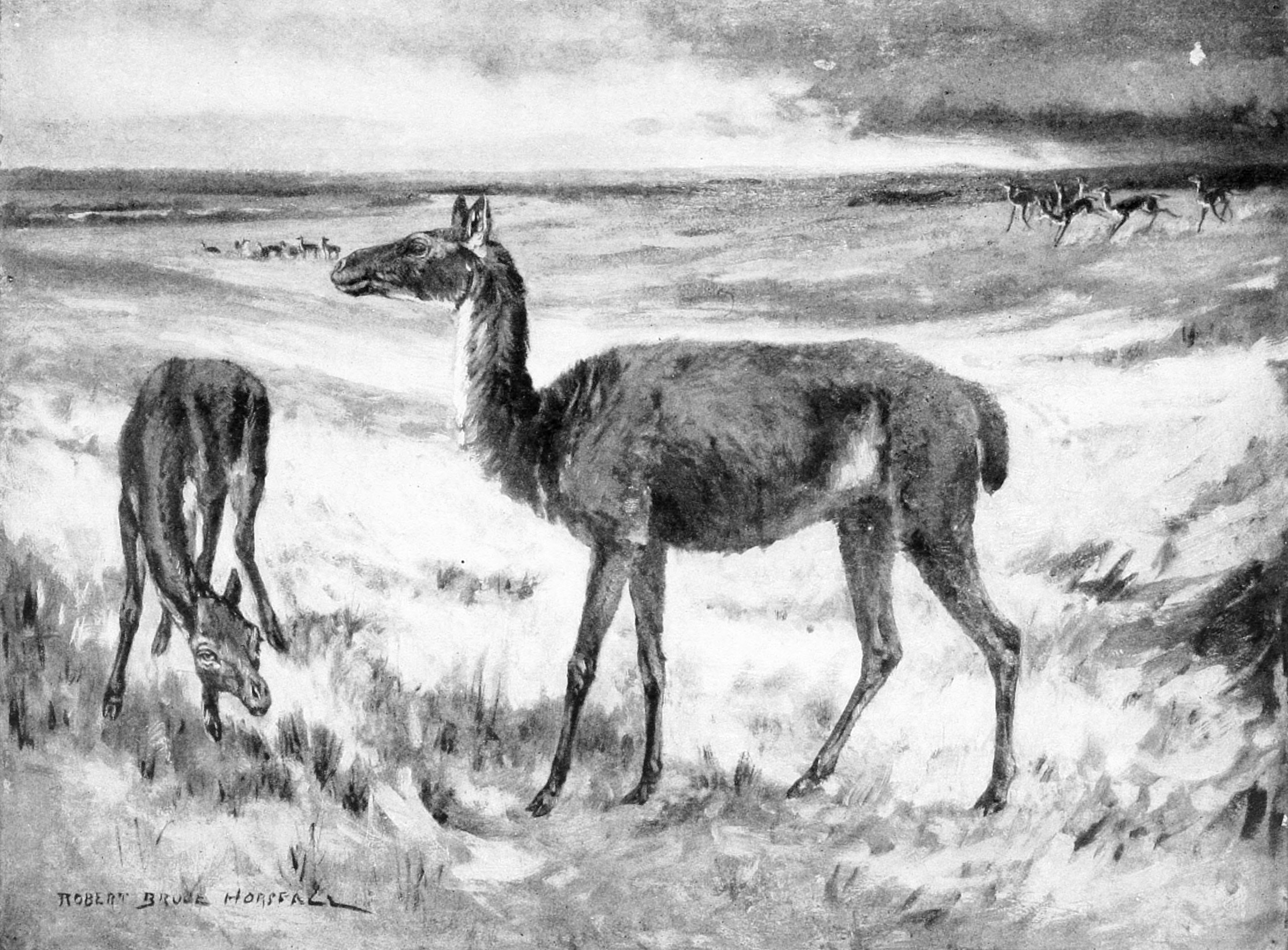
- Life restoration of the Eocene-Oligocene camel Poebrotherium
  †Poebrotherium
  - †Poebrotherium eximium
  - †Poebrotherium wilsoni
- †Poliomyia – type locality for genus
  - †Poliomyia recta – type locality for species
- †Pollyosbornia
  - †Pollyosbornia altidens – or unidentified comparable form
- Polygyra
- †Pontifactor
  - †Pontifactor bestiola – type locality for species
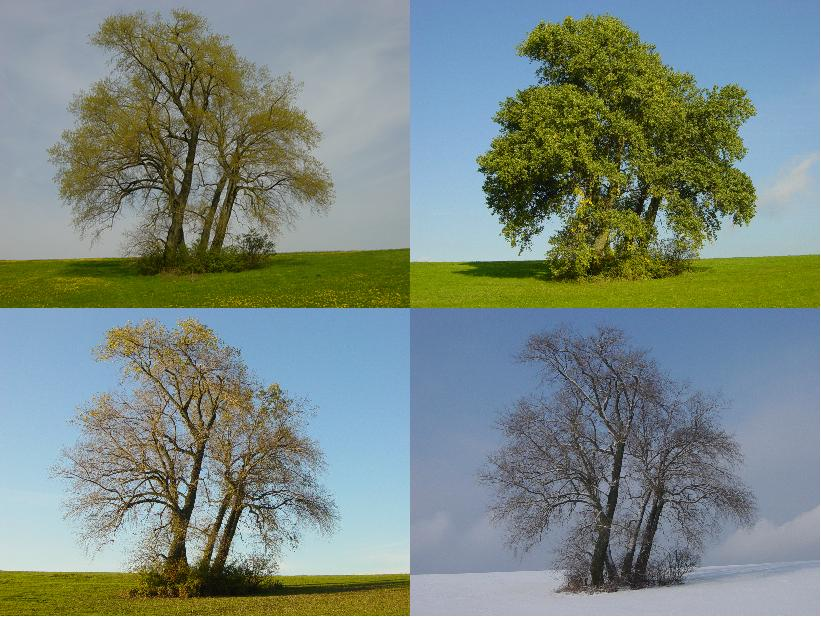
- Montage of photographs in spring (top left), summer (top right), autumn (bottom left), and winter (bottom right) of Populus, or poplar tree
  Populus
  - †Populus balsamoides
  - †Populus cinnamomoides
  - †Populus daphnogenoides
  - †Populus FW60 informal
  - †Populus glandulifera
  - †Populus meigsii
  - †Populus nebraskana
  - †Populus speciosa
  - †Populus vivaria
  - †Populus wilmattae
  - †Populus wyomingiana
  - †Populus xantholithensis
- Porzana
  - †Porzana carolina
- †Potamogeton
- †Premnoides
  - †Premnoides douglassi
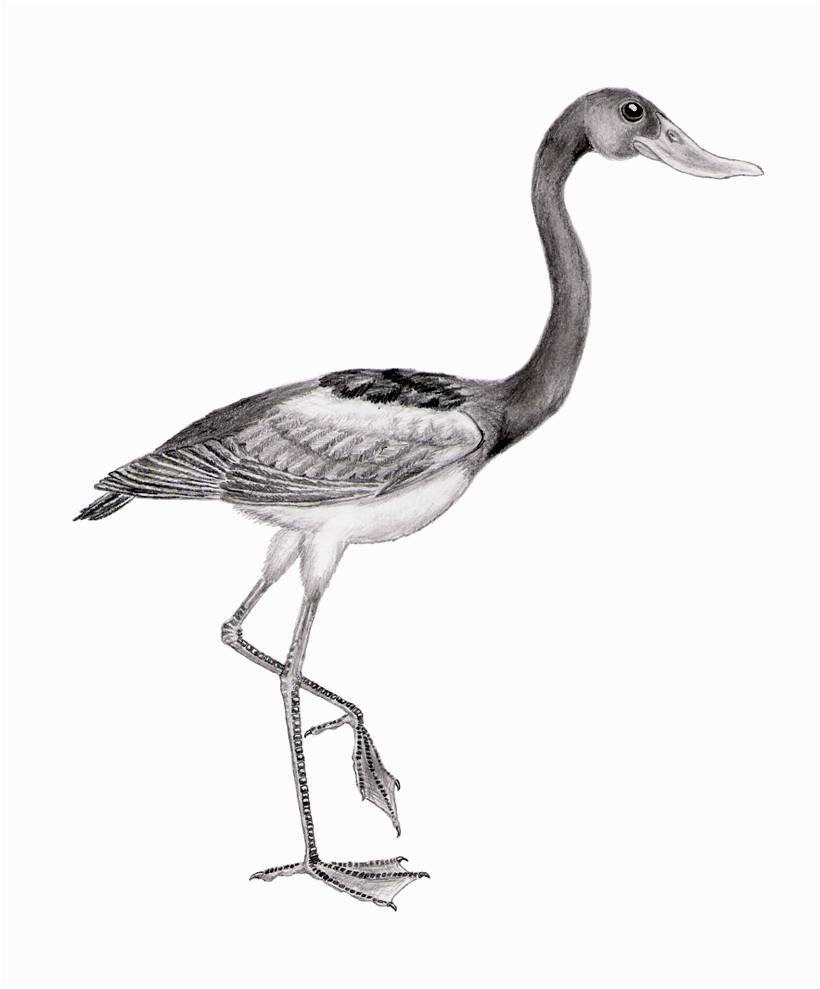
- Life restoration of the Paleocene-Eocene waterfowl Presbyornis
  †Presbyornis
- †Primobucco
  - †Primobucco kistneri
  - †Primobucco mcgrewi
- †Princetonia
  - †Princetonia yalensis
- †Priscacara
- †Priscachara
- †Pristichampsus
- †Probathyopsis
  - †Probathyopsis harrisorum
  - †Probathyopsis lysitensis
  - †Probathyopsis praecursor
- †Problastomeryx
  - †Problastomeryx primus – type locality for species
- †Procaimanoidea
  - †Procaimanoidea kayi – type locality for species
- †Procamelus
  - †Procamelus grandis
- †Procerberus
  - †Procerberus formicarum – or unidentified comparable form
  - †Procerberus grandis – or unidentified comparable form
- †Prochetodon
  - †Prochetodon cavus – type locality for species
  - †Prochetodon foxi
  - †Prochetodon taxus – type locality for species
- †Procydnus – tentative report
  - †Procydnus mamillanus – type locality for species
- †Procynodictis
  - †Procynodictis vulpiceps
- †Prodiacodon
  - †Prodiacodon concordiarcensis – type locality for species
  - †Prodiacodon furor – or unidentified comparable form
  - †Prodiacodon puercensis – or unidentified comparable form
  - †Prodiacodon tauricinerei
- †Proharrymys
  - †Proharrymys schlaikjeri
- †Prolimnocyon
  - †Prolimnocyon antiguus
  - †Prolimnocyon antiquus
  - †Prolimnocyon atavus
  - †Prolimnocyon eerius
  - †Prolimnocyon haematus – type locality for species
- †Promartes
  - †Promartes lepidus
  - †Promartes olcotti
  - †Promartes vantasselensis
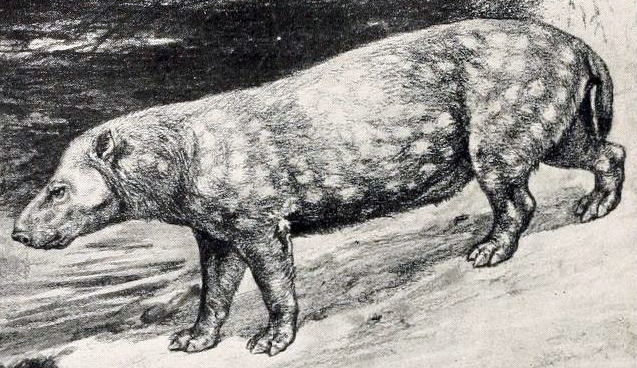
- Restoration of the Miocene hippopotamus-like oreodont Promerycochoerus both onshore and in the water. Robert Bruce Horsfall (1913).
  †Promerycochoerus
  - †Promerycochoerus carrikeri
  - †Promerycochoerus superbus
- †Promioclaenus
  - †Promioclaenus acolytus
  - †Promioclaenus pipiringosi – type locality for species
- †Pronemobius
  - †Pronemobius induratus – type locality for species
  - †Pronemobius tertiarius – type locality for species
- †Pronothodectes
  - †Pronothodectes jepi – type locality for species
- †Propalaeanodon – type locality for genus
  - †Propalaeanodon schaffi – type locality for species
- †Proscalops
  - †Proscalops miocaenus
  - †Proscalops secundus – or unidentified comparable form
- †Prosciurus
  - †Prosciurus vetustus
- †Protadjidaumo – tentative report
  - †Protadjidaumo typus
- †Protagras – type locality for genus
  - †Protagras lacustris – type locality for species
- †Protamphipteryx – type locality for genus
  - †Protamphipteryx basalis – type locality for species
- †Prothryptacodon
  - †Prothryptacodon furens
  - †Prothryptacodon hilli – type locality for species
- †Protictis
  - †Protictis agastor – type locality for species
  - †Protictis aprophatos
  - †Protictis haydenianus
  - †Protictis microlestes
  - †Protictis paralus
- †Protoboysia
  - †Protoboysia complicata
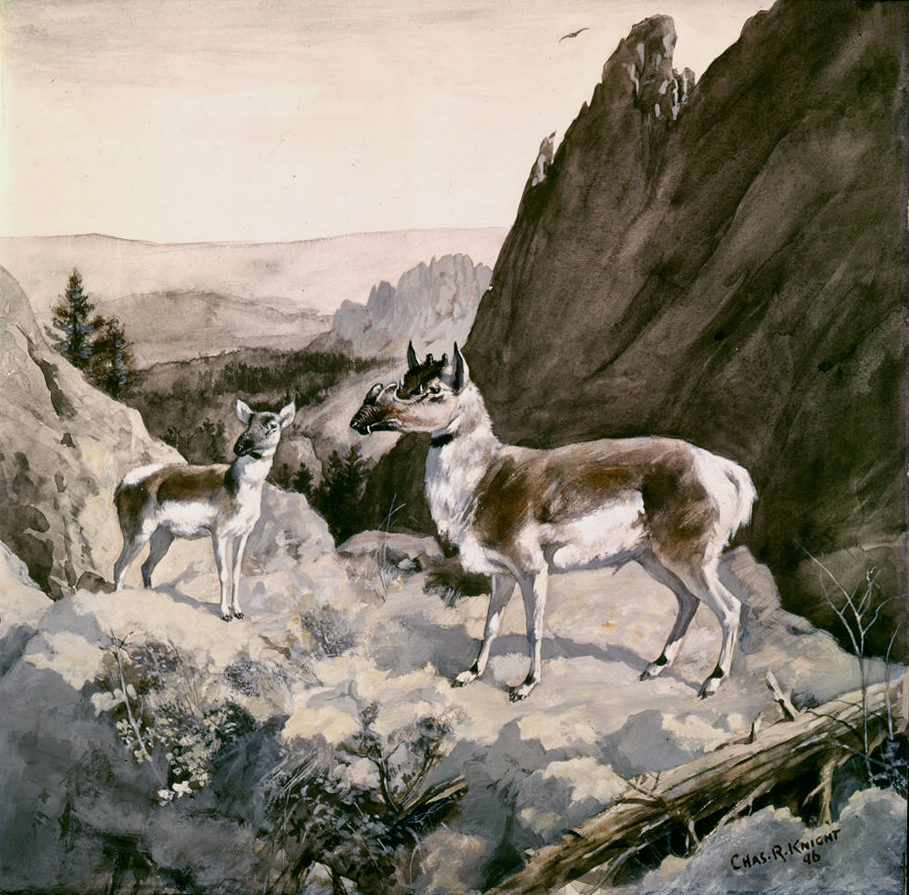
- Life restoration of a female (left) and male of the Oligocene-Miocene even-toed ungulate Protoceras. Charles R. Knight (1896).
  †Protoceras
  - †Protoceras neatodelpha – type locality for species
- †Protochelydra
  - †Protochelydra zangerli – or unidentified comparable form
- †Protochriacus
  - †Protochriacus simplex – or unidentified comparable form
- †Protohippus
  - †Protohippus perditus – or unidentified comparable form
- †Protolabis
  - †Protolabis heterodontus – or unidentified comparable form
- †Protomarctus
  - †Protomarctus optatus
- †Protopsalis
- †Protoptychus
  - †Protoptychus hatcheri
- †Protoreodon
  - †Protoreodon parvus – or unidentified comparable form
  - †Protoreodon petersoni – or unidentified comparable form
  - †Protoreodon pumilus
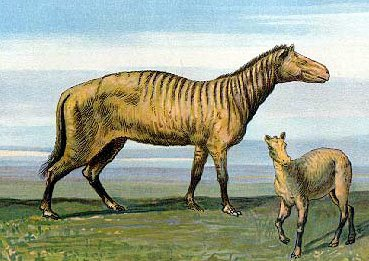
- Protorohippus
  †Protorohippus
  - †Protorohippus montanum
  - †Protorohippus venticolum
- †Protoselene – tentative report
  - †Protoselene novissimus – type locality for species
- †Protospermophilus
  - †Protospermophilus kelloggi
- †Protostrix
  - †Protostrix leptosteus
  - †Protostrix saurodosis – type locality for species
- †Prototomus
  - †Prototomus deimos – type locality for species
  - †Prototomus martis – type locality for species
  - †Prototomus phobos
  - †Prototomus robustus
  - †Prototomus secundarius
- †Protungulatum
  - †Protungulatum donnae
  - †Protungulatum gorgun
  - †Protungulatum sloani
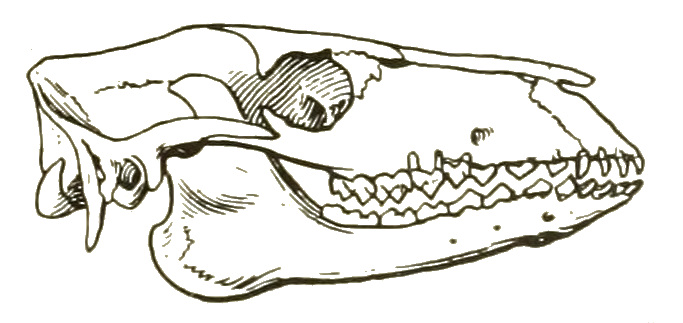
- Illustration of a fossilized skull of the Eocene camel Protylopus
  †Protylopus
  - †Protylopus petersoni
- †Provaranosaurus – type locality for genus
  - †Provaranosaurus acutus – type locality for species
  - †Provaranosaurus fatuus – type locality for species
- †Proviverroides
  - †Proviverroides piercei
- †Proxestops
  - †Proxestops silberlingii – type locality for species
- Prunus
  - †Prunus corrugis
  - †Prunus stewarti
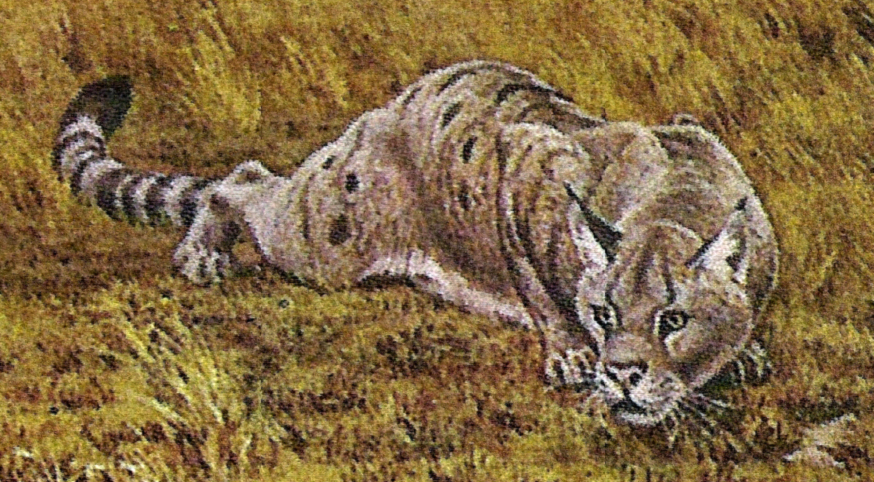
- Restoration of the Miocene cat Pseudaelurus
  †Pseudaelurus
  - †Pseudaelurus intrepidus
- †Pseudhipparion
  - †Pseudhipparion retrusum
- †Pseudoblastomeryx
  - †Pseudoblastomeryx advena
- †Pseudocemophora
  - †Pseudocemophora antiqua – or unidentified comparable form
- †Pseudocrypturus – type locality for genus
  - †Pseudocrypturus cercanaxius – type locality for species
- †Pseudocylindrodon
  - †Pseudocylindrodon medius
  - †Pseudocylindrodon tobeyi
- †Pseudodesmatochoerus – type locality for genus
  - †Pseudodesmatochoerus hoffmani – type locality for species
- †Pseudolabis
  - †Pseudolabis dakotensis
- †Pseudopalaeocastor
  - †Pseudopalaeocastor osmagnus
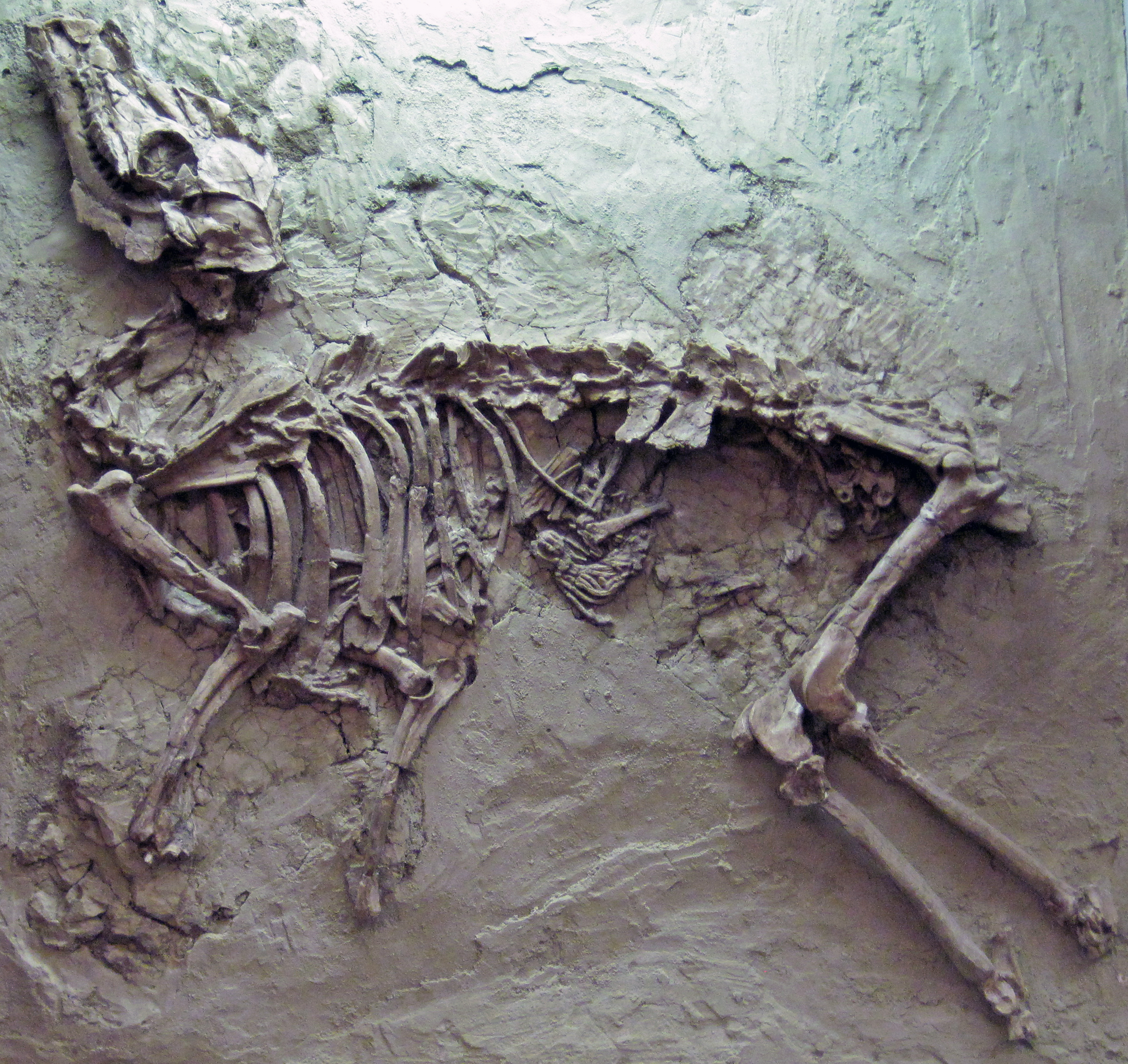
- Fossilized skeleton of the Eocene protoceratid mammal Pseudoprotoceras
  †Pseudoprotoceras
  - †Pseudoprotoceras longinaris
  - †Pseudoprotoceras minor – type locality for species
  - †Pseudoprotoceras taylori
- †Pseudotetonius
  - †Pseudotetonius ambiguus
- †Pseudotheridomys
  - †Pseudotheridomys pagei – or unidentified comparable form
- †Pseudotomus
  - †Pseudotomus hians – type locality for species
  - †Pseudotomus horribilis – type locality for species
  - †Pseudotomus robustus – type locality for species
- †Psilosemys – type locality for genus
  - †Psilosemys wyomingensis – type locality for species
- †Psilota
  - †Psilota tabidosa – type locality for species
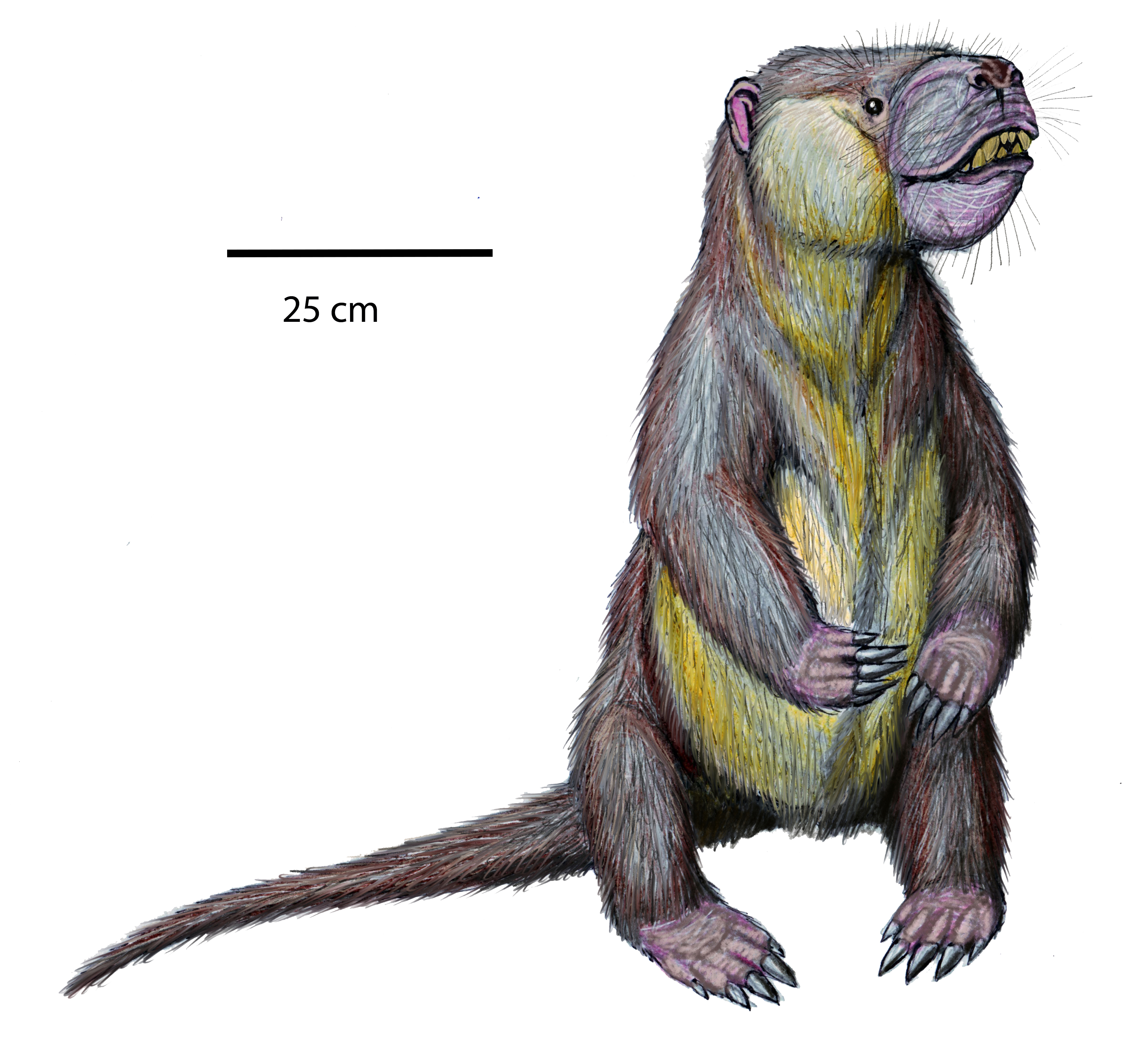
- Life restoration of the Paleocene taeniodont mammal Psittacotherium multifragum
  †Psittacotherium
  - †Psittacotherium multifragum
- Ptelea
  - †Ptelea cassioides
- Pteris – or unidentified related form
  - †Pteris silvicola
- Pterocarya
  - †Pterocarya glabra
  - †Pterocarya hispida
  - †Pterocarya macginitii
- †Pteromogoplistes
  - †Pteromogoplistes smithii – type locality for species
- †Pterospermites
  - †Pterospermites haguei
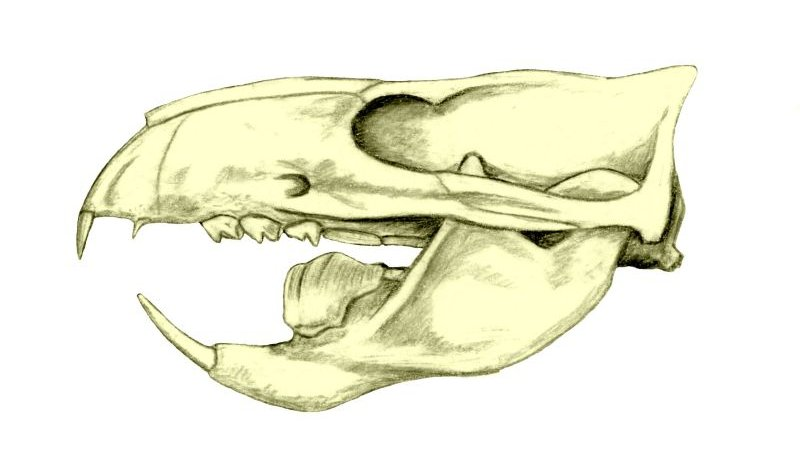
- Illustration of a fossilized skull of the Paleocene multituberculate mammal Ptilodus
  †Ptilodus
  - †Ptilodus fractus
  - †Ptilodus gnomus
  - †Ptilodus kummae
  - †Ptilodus mediaevus
  - †Ptilodus montanus – or unidentified comparable form
  - †Ptilodus tsosiensis – or unidentified comparable form
  - †Ptilodus wyomingensis – type locality for species
- †Pulverflumen
  - †Pulverflumen magnificum – type locality for species
- Puma
  - †Puma concolor
- Pupilla – or unidentified comparable form
- †Pyramidula
  - †Pyramidula ralstonensis
- †Pyrocyon
  - †Pyrocyon dioctetus

== Q ==
- †Quadratomus
  - †Quadratomus grandis
  - †Quadratomus grossus
  - †Quadratomus sundelli
- †Quercinium
  - †Quercinium knowltoni
  - †Quercinium lamarense
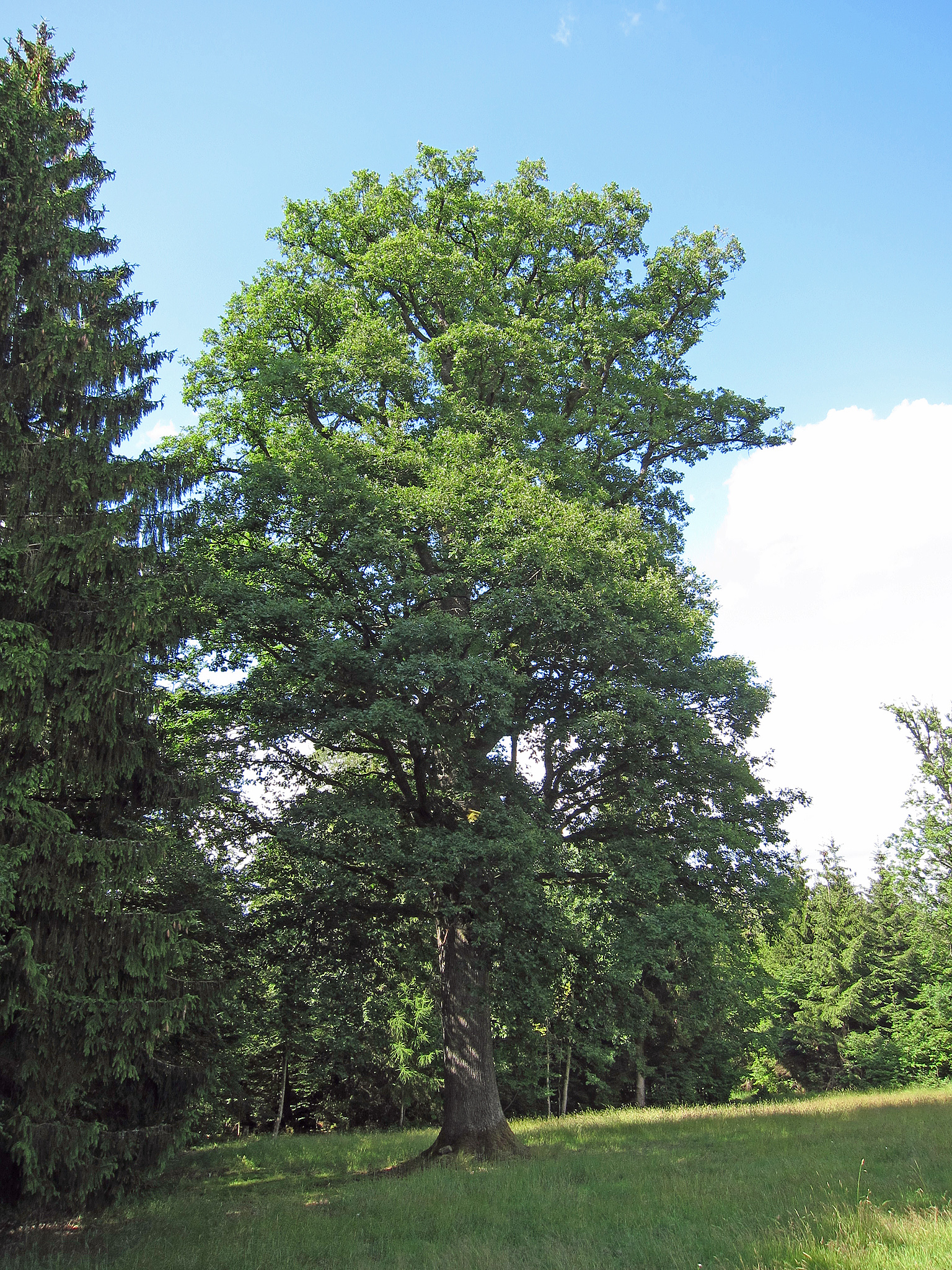
- A living Quercus, or oak tree
  Quercus
  - †Quercus consimilis – tentative report
  - †Quercus culveri
  - †Quercus cuneatus – type locality for species
  - †Quercus drymeja
  - †Quercus furcinervis
  - †Quercus GR522 informal
  - †Quercus GR575 informal
  - †Quercus greenlandica
  - †Quercus grosidentata
  - †Quercus hesperia
  - †Quercus magnifolia
  - †Quercus olafseni
  - †Quercus petros – type locality for species
  - †Quercus sullyi
  - †Quercus weedii
  - †Quercus yanceyi
- †Quereuxia
  - †Quereuxia angulata
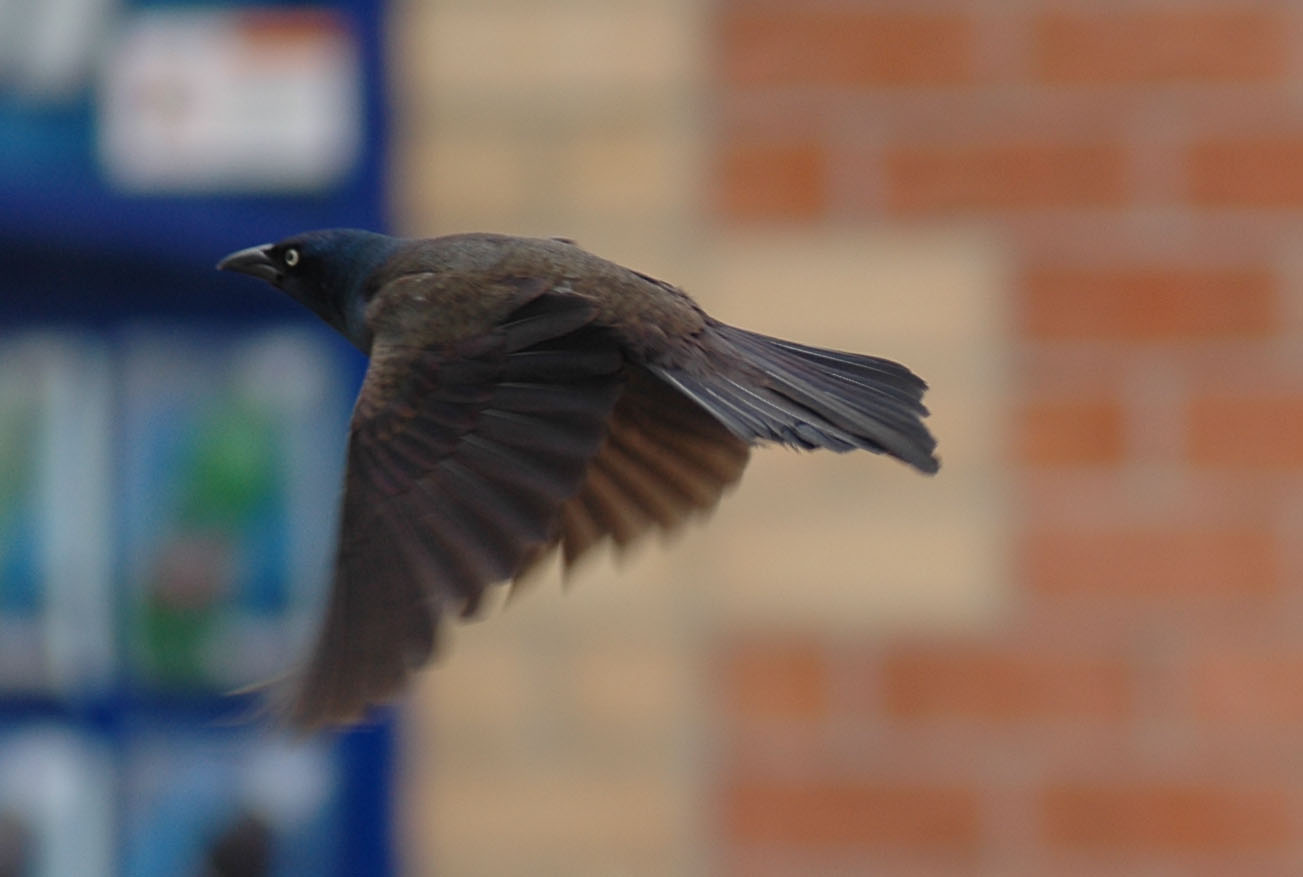
- A living Quiscalus, or grackle
  Quiscalus – or unidentified comparable form

== R ==
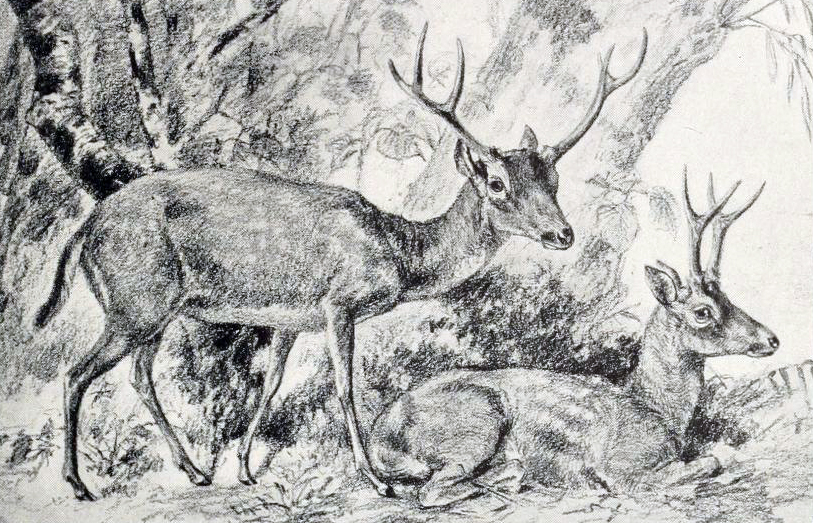
- Life restoration of the Miocene-Pliocene pronghorn Ramoceros and Cosoryx. Robert Bruce Horsfall (1913).
  †Ramoceros
- †Rapamys
  - †Rapamys wilsoni
- †Raphictis
  - †Raphictis gausion – type locality for species
- †Reithroparamyine
- †Reithroparamys
  - †Reithroparamys delicatissimus – type locality for species
  - †Reithroparamys huerfanensis
- †Restes – type locality for genus
  - †Restes rugosus – type locality for species
- †Reticuloidosporites
  - †Reticuloidosporites pseudomurii
- †Rhamnacinium
  - †Rhamnacinium radiatum
- †Rhamnus
  - †Rhamnus cleburni
  - †Rhamnus hirsuta
  - †Rhamnus rectinervis
- Rhineura – type locality for genus
  - †Rhineura hatcherii – type locality for species
- Rhinoclemmys – report made of unidentified related form or using admittedly obsolete nomenclature
  - †Rhinoclemmys terrestris
- Rhus
  - †Rhus mixta – tentative report
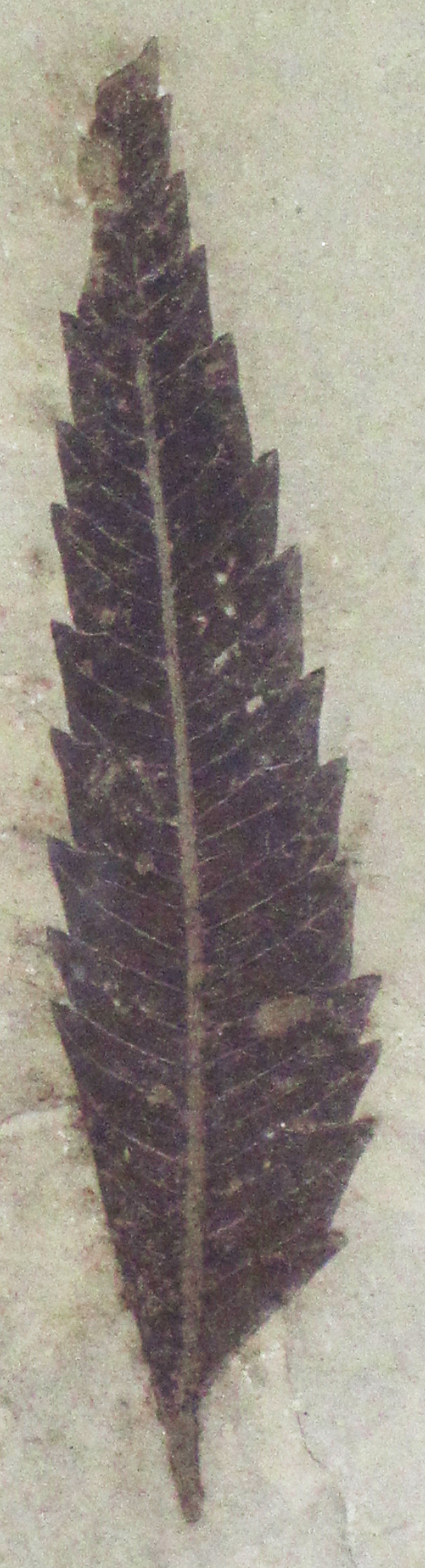
  - A Rhus nigricans leaf
    †Rhus nigricans
- †Rhyssa
  - †Rhyssa juvenis – type locality for species
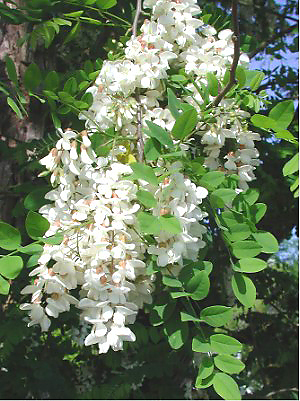
- Flowers of a living Robinia
  †Robinia
  - †Robinia wardi
- Rosa
  - †Rosa hilliae
- †Rymosia
  - †Rymosia strangulata – type locality for species

== S ==
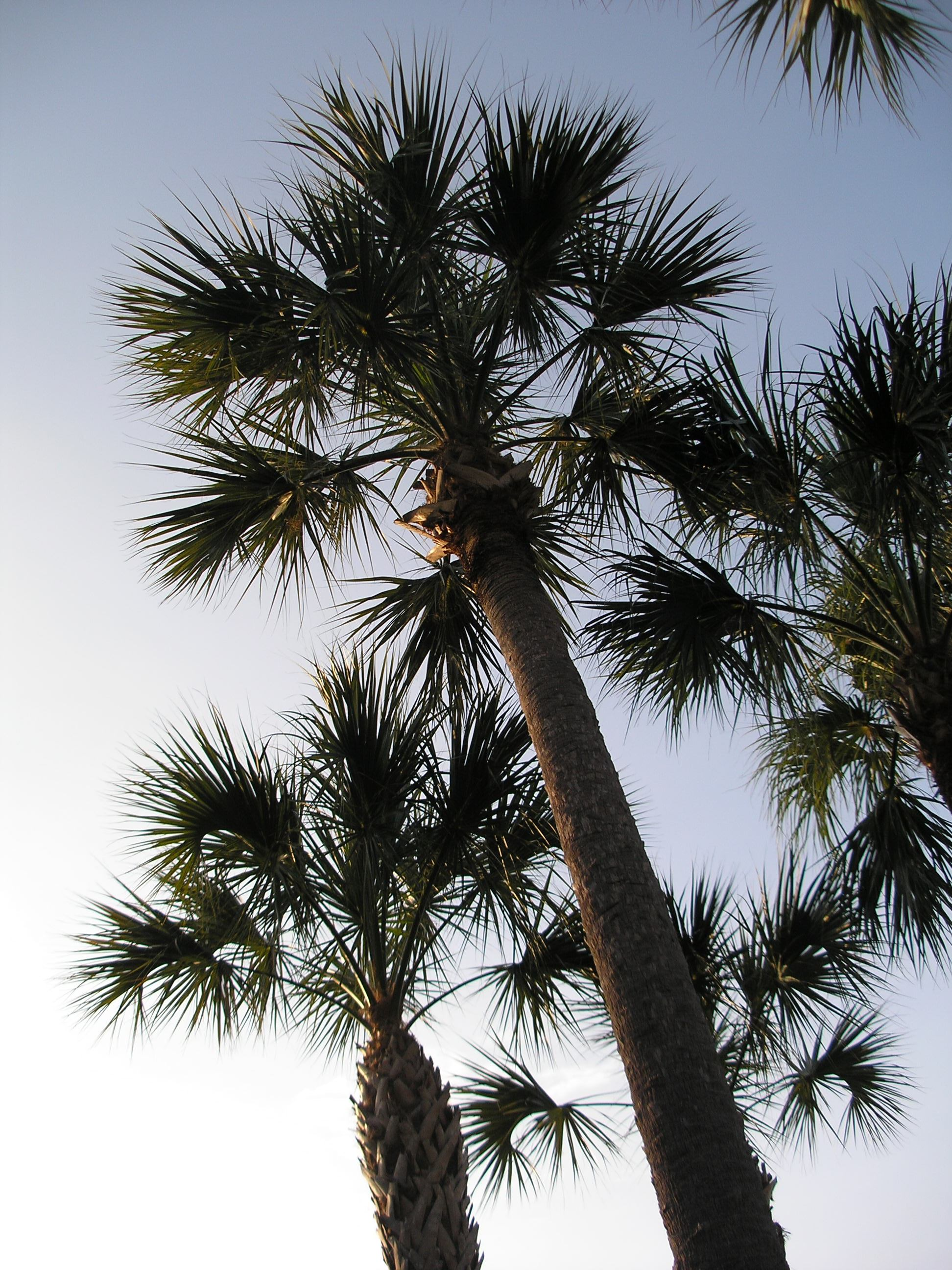
- Living Sabal, or palmettos
  Sabal
  - †Sabal grayana
  - †Sabal powelli
- †Sabalitesamesoneuron
  - †Sabalitesamesoneuron RR34 informal
- †Saccoloma
  - †Saccoloma gardneri
- †Sackenia
  - †Sackenia gibbosa – type locality for species
- †Salilx
  - †Salilx longiacuminata
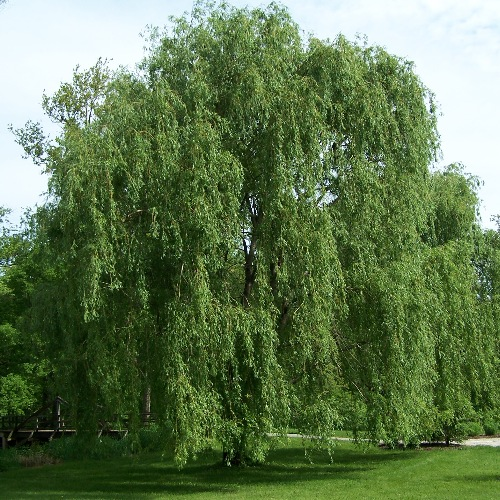
- A living Salix, or willow
  Salix
  - †Salix angusta
  - †Salix aquilina
  - †Salix cockerelli
  - †Salix elongata – tentative report
  - †Salix lavateri
  - †Salix varians
- †Salpinctes – or unidentified comparable form
  - †Salpinctes obsoletus
- †Salvinia
  - †Salvinia preauriculata
- †Sanctimus
  - †Sanctimus simonisi – type locality for species
  - †Sanctimus stouti – type locality for species
  - †Sanctimus stuartae
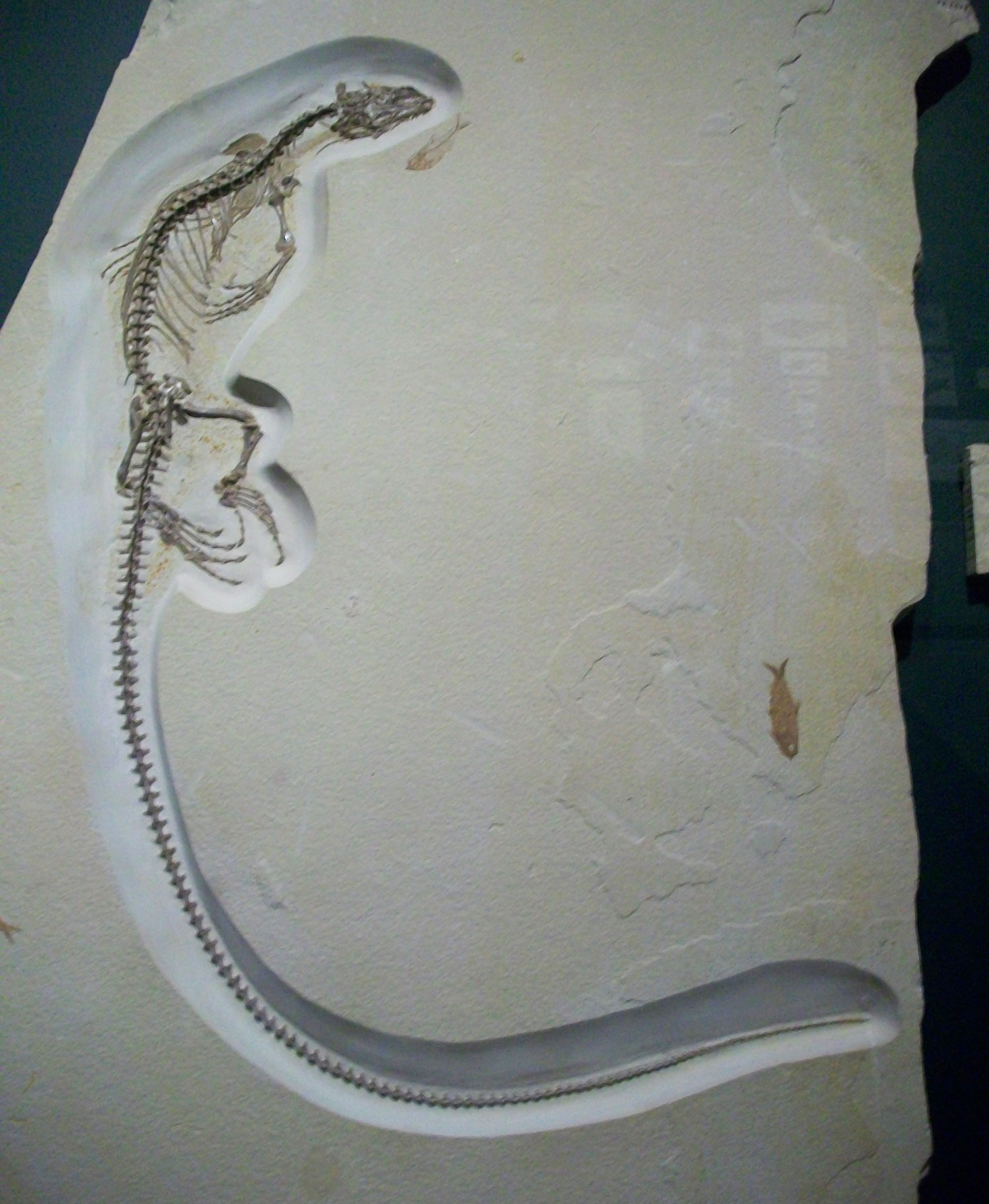
- Fossilized skeleton of the Eocene monitor lizard Saniwa
  †Saniwa – type locality for genus
  - †Saniwa ensidens – type locality for species
  - †Saniwa major – type locality for species
  - †Saniwa stenodon
- †Sapindaceous
- †Sapindus
  - †Sapindus alatus
  - †Sapindus grandifolioloides
  - †Sapindus grandifoliolus
  - †Sapindus wardii
- Sassafras
  - †Sassafras thermale
- †Scalopoides
- †Scapherpeton
  - †Scapherpeton tectum
- †Scenopagus
  - †Scenopagus curtidens
  - †Scenopagus edenensis
  - †Scenopagus hewettensis – type locality for species
  - †Scenopagus priscus
- †Schaubeumys
  - †Schaubeumys sabrae
- †Schizodontomys
  - †Schizodontomys harkseni
  - †Schizodontomys sulcidens
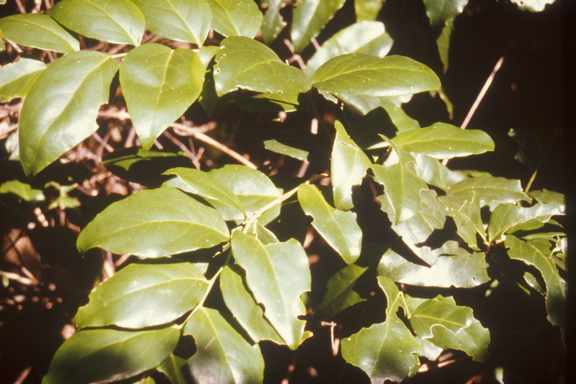
- Foliage of a living Schoepfia
  †Schoepfia
  - †Schoepfia republicensis
- Sciara
  - †Sciara scopuli – type locality for species
- †Scincoideus
  - †Scincoideus grassator – type locality for species
- Sciomyza – tentative report
  - †Sciomyza disjecta – type locality for species
  - †Sciomyza manca – type locality for species
- †Sciophila
  - †Sciophila hyatti – type locality for species
- †Sciuravus
  - †Sciuravus bridgeri – type locality for species
  - †Sciuravus nitidus – type locality for species
  - †Sciuravus popi – or unidentified comparable form
  - †Sciuravus wilsoni
- †Scottimus
  - †Scottimus ambiguus – or unidentified comparable form
  - †Scottimus kellamorum – type locality for species
  - †Scottimus viduus
- †Selenaletes
  - †Selenaletes scopaeus
- Sequoia
  - †Sequoia couttsiae
  - †Sequoia langsdorfii
  - †Sequoia magnifica
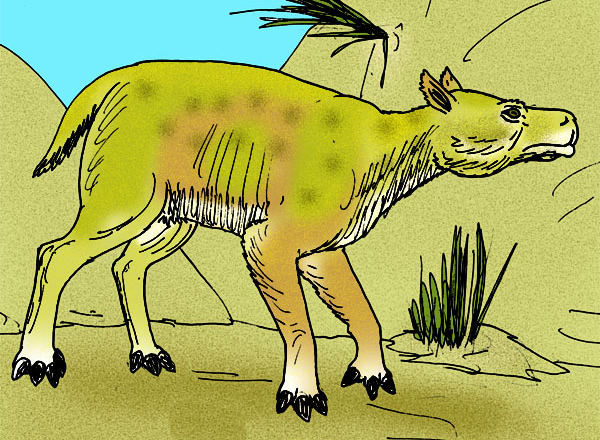
- Life restoration of two species of the Oligocene oreodont mammal genus Sespia
  †Sespia
  - †Sespia nitida
- †Shoshonius
  - †Shoshonius bowni
  - †Shoshonius cooperi
- †Sialia
- †Sifrhippus
  - †Sifrhippus grangeri
  - †Sifrhippus sandrae
- †Sigynorum – type locality for genus
  - †Sigynorum magnadivisus – type locality for species
- †Simoedosaurus
- †Simpsonictis
  - †Simpsonictis jaynanneae – type locality for species
  - †Simpsonictis pegus – type locality for species
  - †Simpsonictis tenuis
- †Simpsonlemur
  - †Simpsonlemur citatus
  - †Simpsonlemur jepseni – or unidentified comparable form
- †Sinclairella
- †Sinomenium – or unidentified related form
  - †Sinomenium RR08 informal
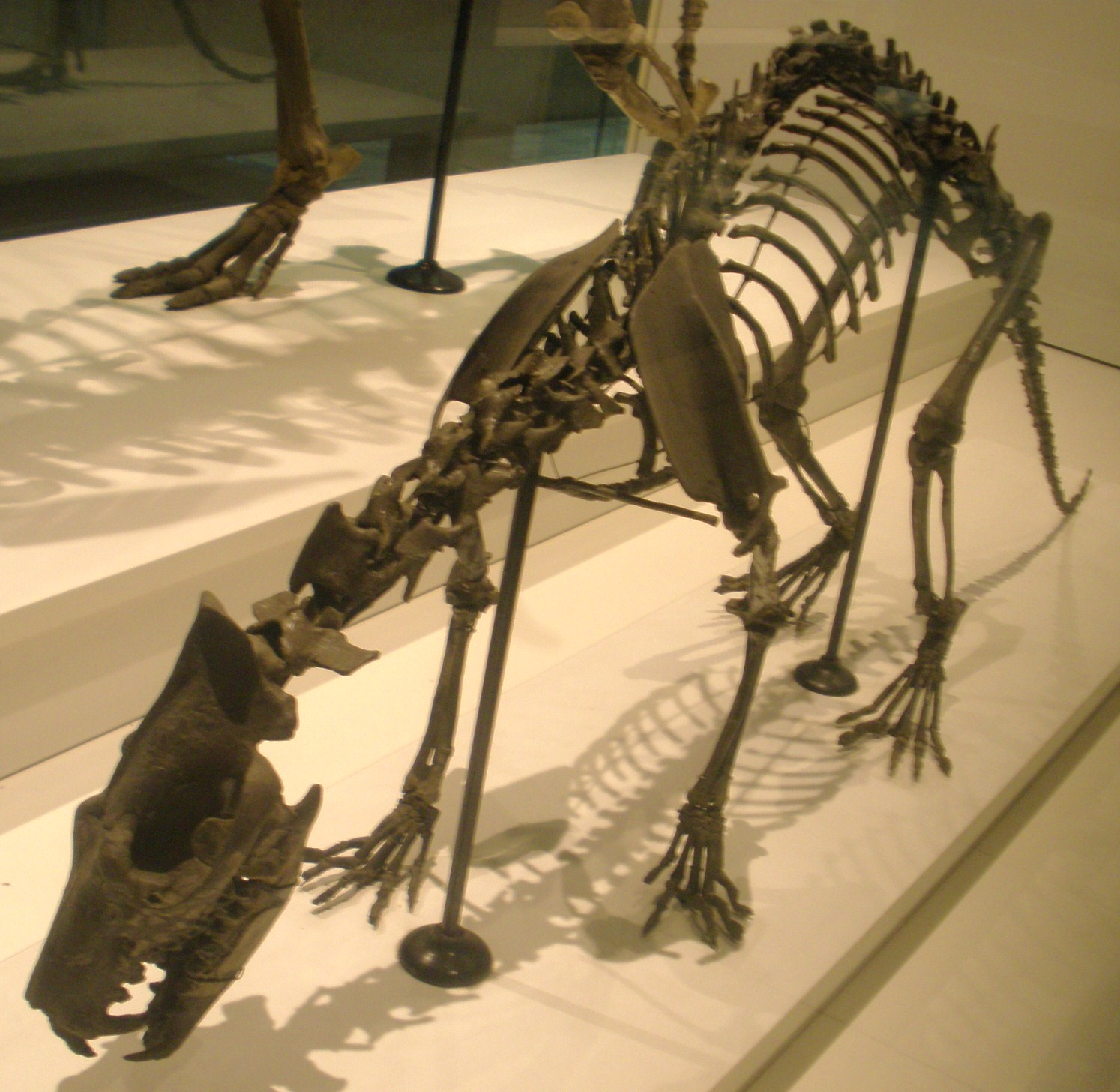
- Fossilized skeleton of the Eocene-Oligocene creodont mammal Sinopa
  †Sinopa
  - †Sinopa agilis – type locality for species
  - †Sinopa major – type locality for species
  - †Sinopa minor
  - †Sinopa rapax – type locality for species
  - †Sinopa viverrinus
- †Siphonophoroides
  - †Siphonophoroides antiqua – tentative report
- Siren
  - †Siren dunni – type locality for species
- Sitona
  - †Sitona grandaevus – type locality for species
  - †Sitona paginarum
- Sloanea – or unidentified related form
  - †Sloanea RR18 informal
- †Smilax
  - †Smilax GR550 informal
  - †Smilax lamarensis
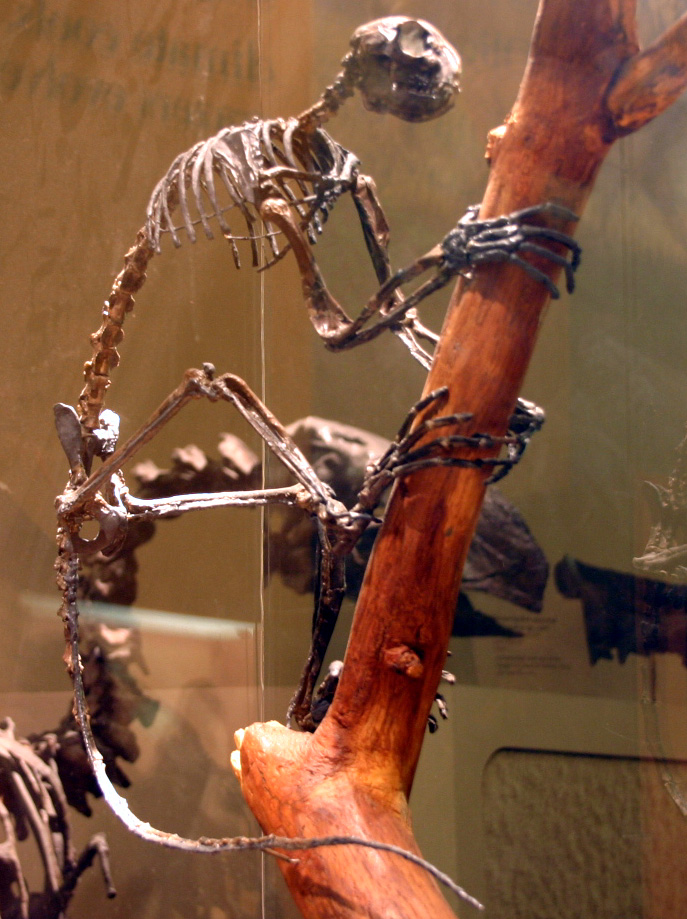
- Mounted fossilized skeleton of the Eocene primate Smilodectes
  †Smilodectes
  - †Smilodectes gibossus – type locality for species
  - †Smilodectes gracilis – type locality for species
  - †Smilodectes mcgrewi – type locality for species
  - †Smilodectes sororis – type locality for species
- Sorex
  - †Sorex hoyi
- †Sparganium
  - †Sparganium stygium
- †Spathorhynchus – type locality for genus
  - †Spathorhynchus fossorium – type locality for species
  - †Spathorhynchus natronicus
- Spermophilus
  - †Spermophilus primitivus
  - †Spermophilus variegatus
- †Sphacorhysis
  - †Sphacorhysis burntforkensis – type locality for species
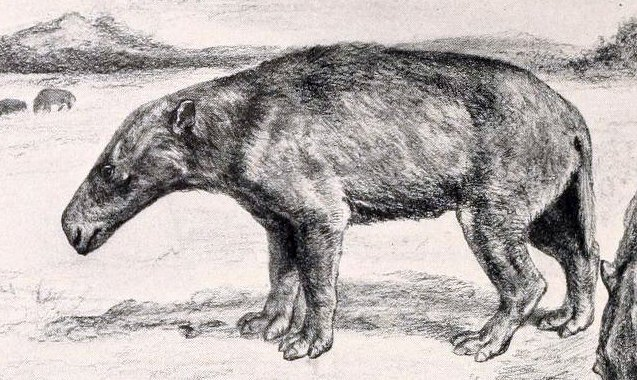
- Life restoration of the Eocene brontothere mammal Sphenocoelus
  †Sphenocoelus
  - †Sphenocoelus hyognathus
  - †Sphenocoelus uintensis
- Spirodela
  - †Spirodela magna
- †Spiza
  - †Spiza americana
- †Spurimus
  - †Spurimus scotti
  - †Spurimus selbyi
- Stagnicola
- †Staphylinites
  - †Staphylinites obsoletum – type locality for species
- †Stegobium
  - †Stegobium defunctus – type locality for species
- †Steinius
  - †Steinius annectens – type locality for species
  - †Steinius vespertinus
- †Steneofiber
  - †Steneofiber fossor
  - †Steneofiber gradatus
- †Stenocinclis – type locality for genus
  - †Stenocinclis anomala – type locality for species
- †Stenogomphus
  - †Stenogomphus scudderi – type locality for species
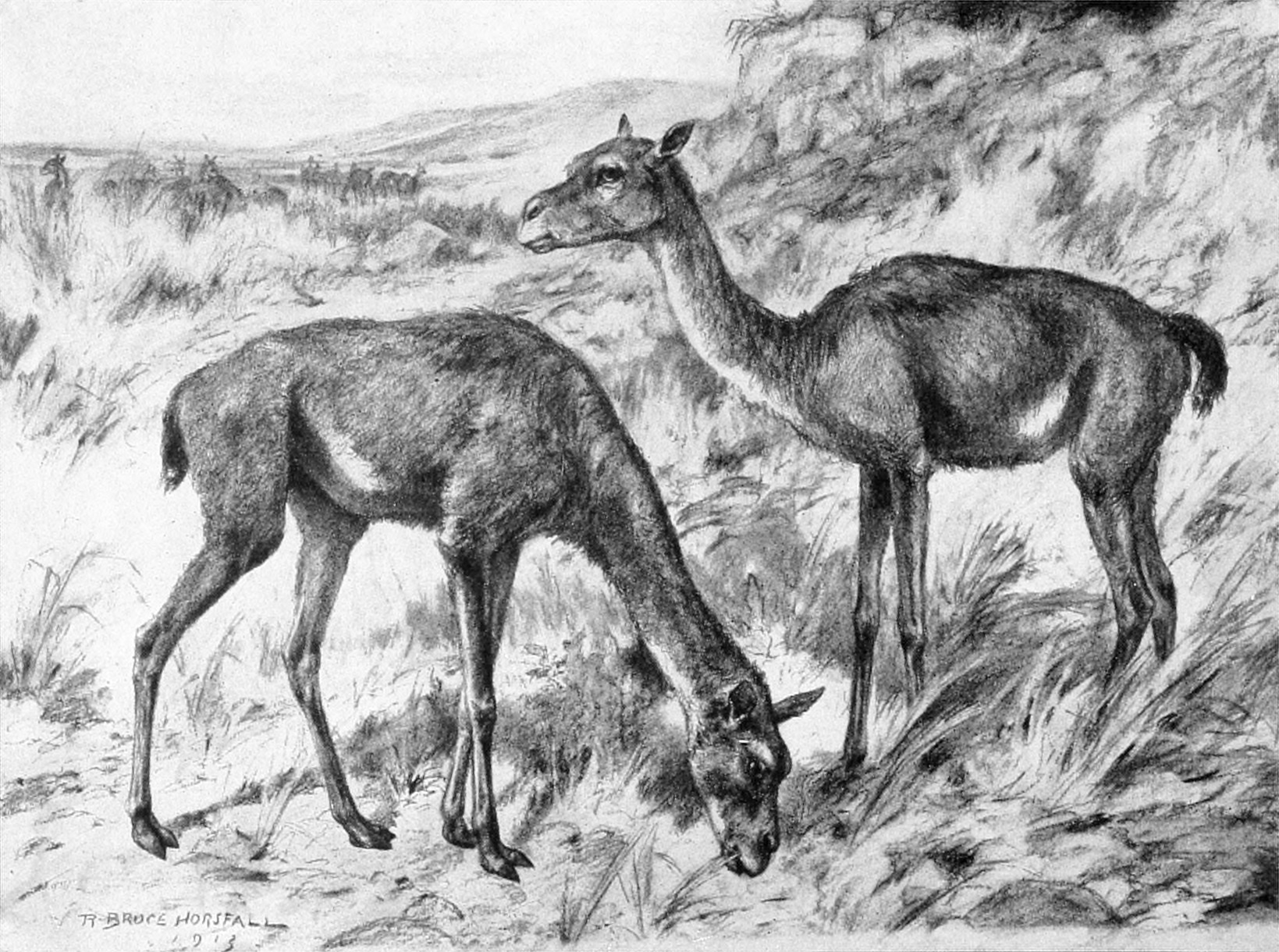
- Life restoration of the Oligocene-Miocene camel Stenomylus
  †Stenomylus
  - †Stenomylus gracilis
  - †Stenomylus hitchcocki
  - †Stenomylus keelinensis
- †Stenopelta
  - †Stenopelta punctulata – type locality for species
- Sterculia
  - †Sterculia coloradensis
- †Stibarus
  - †Stibarus quadricuspis
  - †Stibarus yoderensis
- †Stillingia
  - †Stillingia casca
- †Straitopollis
  - †Straitopollis tectatus
- †Strigorhysis – type locality for genus
  - †Strigorhysis bridgerensis – type locality for species
  - †Strigorhysis rugosus
- Sturnella
  - †Sturnella neglecta
- †Stygimys
  - †Stygimys gratus
  - †Stygimys kuszmauli
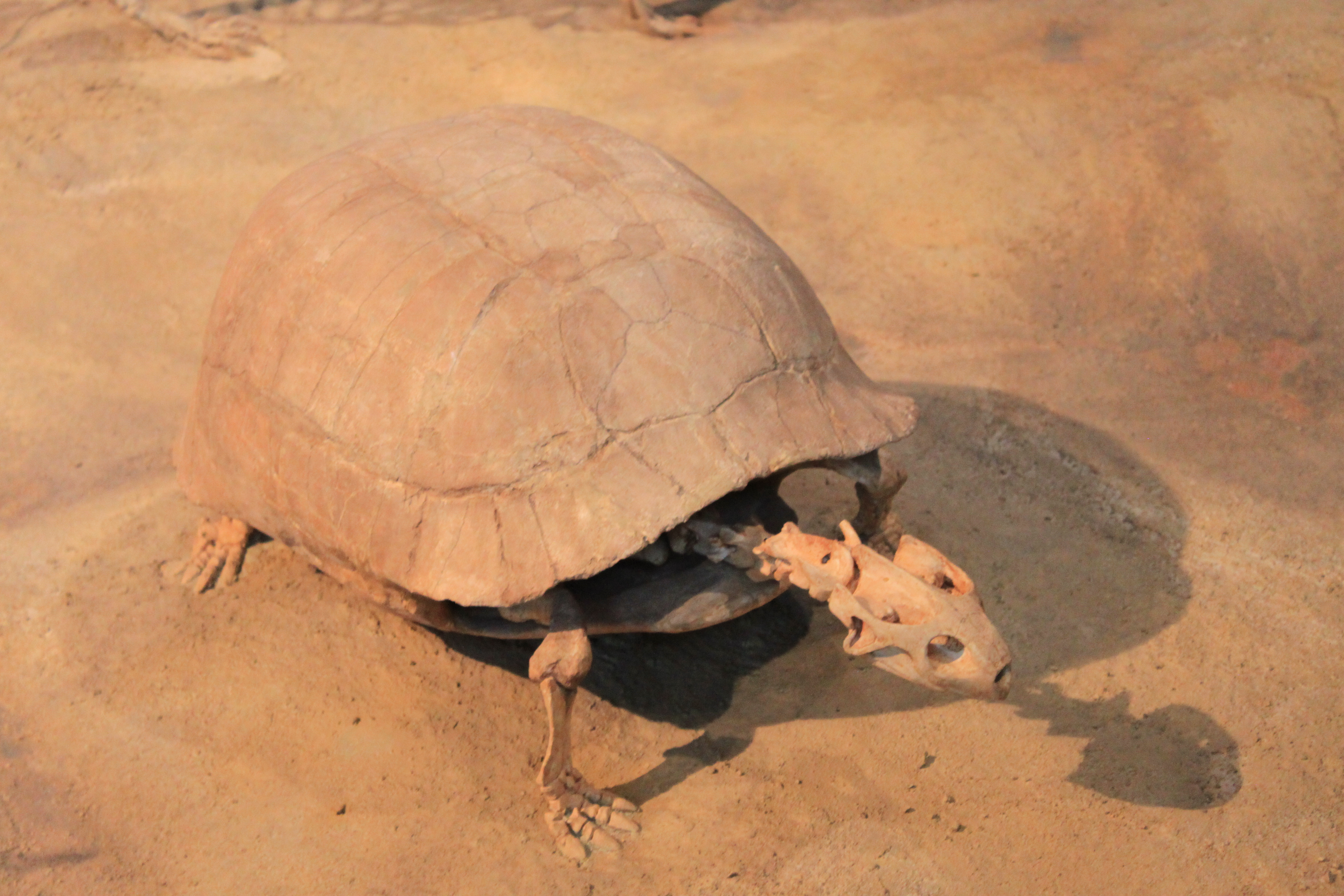
- Mounted fossilized skeleton of the Eocene-Oligocene tortoise Stylemys
  †Stylemys
  - †Stylemys nebrascensis
- †Stylinodon
  - †Stylinodon mirus – type locality for species
- †Styrax
  - †Styrax transversa
- †Subhyracodon
  - †Subhyracodon mitis
  - †Subhyracodon occidentalis
- Surnia
  - †Surnia ulula
- †Suzanniwana – type locality for genus
  - †Suzanniwana patriciana – type locality for species
  - †Suzanniwana revenanta – type locality for species
- †Swaindelphys
  - †Swaindelphys cifellii – type locality for species
- †Swainiguanoides – type locality for genus
  - †Swainiguanoides milleri – type locality for species
- †Swartzia
  - †Swartzia wardelii – type locality for species
- Sylvicola – type locality for genus
  - †Sylvicola cadaver – type locality for species
- Sylvilagus
- Symplocos
  - †Symplocos exilis
- Synaptomys
- †Syncolporites
  - †Syncolporites minimus
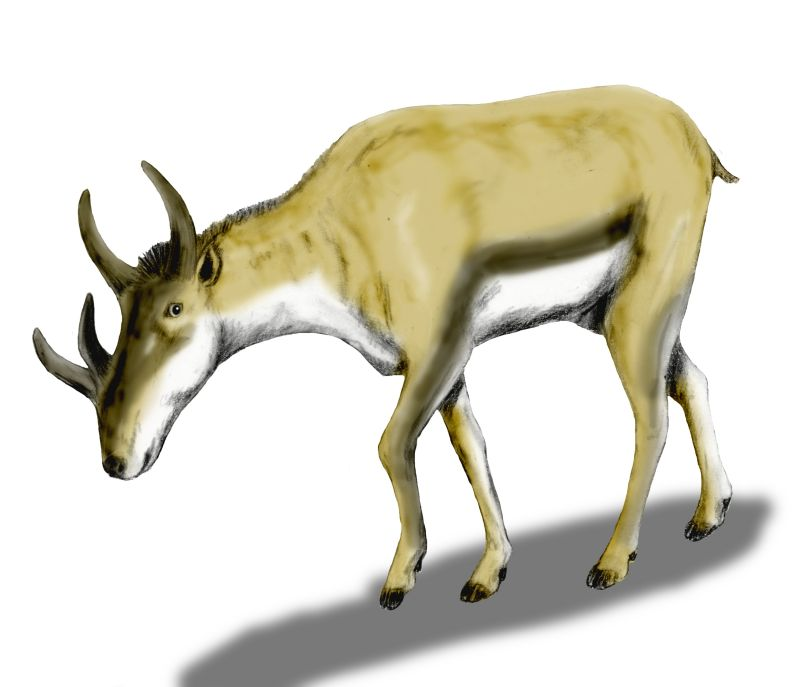
- Life restoration of the Miocene protoceratid mammal Syndyoceras
  †Syndyoceras
  - †Syndyoceras cooki
- †Syntomostylus
  - †Syntomostylus fortis – type locality for species
- Syrphus
- †Systemodon
  - †Systemodon tapirinus
- †Syzygioides
  - †Syzygioides americana

== T ==
- Tachycineta – or unidentified comparable form
  - †Tachycineta bicolor
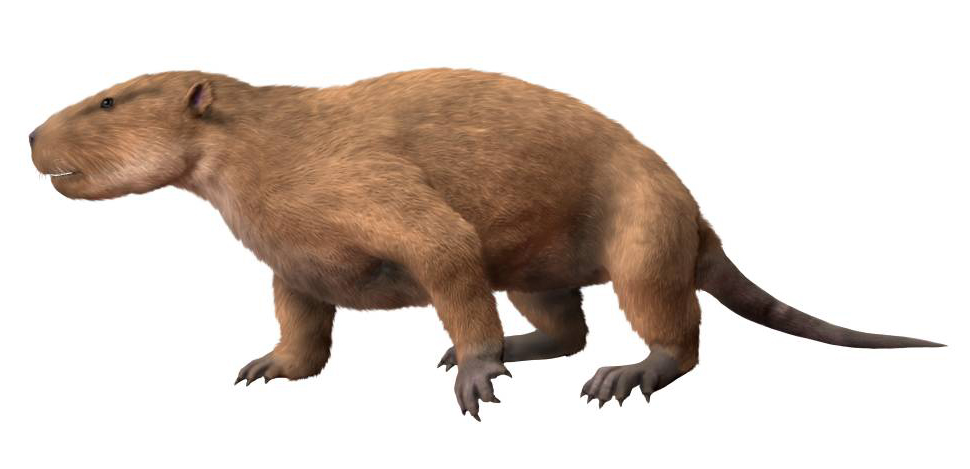
- Restoration of the Paleocene multituberculate mammal Taeniolabis
  †Taeniolabis
  - †Taeniolabis taoensis
- †Talpavoides
  - †Talpavoides dartoni – type locality for species
- †Talpavus
  - †Talpavus duplus
  - †Talpavus nitidus
  - †Talpavus sullivani – type locality for species
- Tamias
  - †Tamias ateles – or unidentified comparable form
- †Tanymykter
  - †Tanymykter brachyodontus
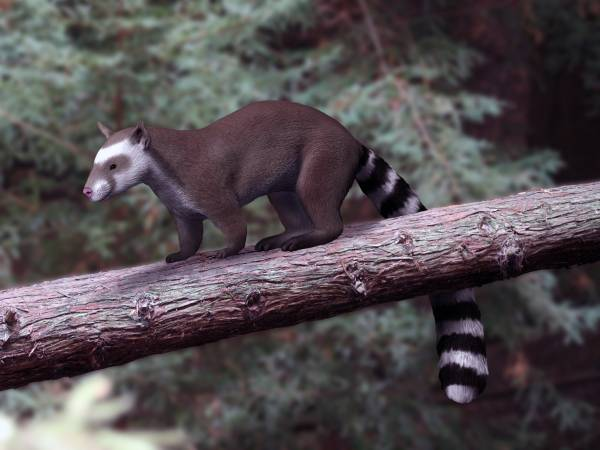
- Life restoration of the Eocene carnivoran relative Tapocyon
  †Tapocyon
  - †Tapocyon robustus – or unidentified comparable form
- †Tarka
  - †Tarka stylifera
- †Tatmanius – type locality for genus
  - †Tatmanius szalayi – type locality for species
- Taxidea
  - †Taxidea taxus
- †Taxites
  - †Taxites olriki
- Taxodium
  - †Taxodium olriki
  - †Taxodium olrikii
- †Taxonus
  - †Taxonus nortoni – type locality for species
- †Taxymys
  - †Taxymys lucaris
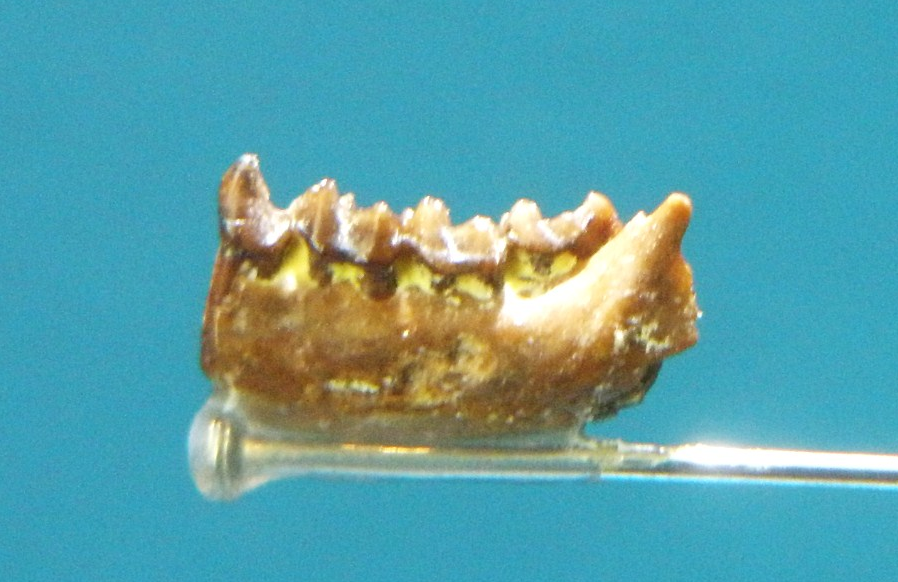
- Fossilized mandible of the Eocene primate Teilhardina
  †Teilhardina
  - †Teilhardina americana – type locality for species. Late reclassified in the new genus Bownomomys as the species B. americanus.
  - †Teilhardina brandti – type locality for species
  - †Teilhardina crassidens – type locality for species. Later reclassified as Bownomomys crassidens.
  - †Teilhardina demissa – type locality for species
  - †Teilhardina gingerichi
  - †Teilhardina mathewi
  - †Teilhardina tenuicula
- †Teleoceras
- †Telmatherium
  - †Telmatherium validum – or unidentified comparable form
  - †Telmatherium validus – type locality for species
- †Telmatrechus
  - †Telmatrechus parallelus – type locality for species
- †Temnocyon
  - †Temnocyon macrogenys – type locality for species
- †Temnotrionyx – type locality for genus
  - †Temnotrionyx manducans – type locality for species
- †Teretrum
  - †Teretrum quiescitum – type locality for species
- †Ternstroemites
  - †Ternstroemites aureavallis
- †Tetigonia
  - †Tetigonia priscomarginata – type locality for species
  - †Tetigonia priscovariegata – type locality for species
- †Tetonius
  - †Tetonius matthewi – type locality for species
- †Tetonoides
  - †Tetonoides pearcei
- †Tetraclaenodon
  - †Tetraclaenodon puercensis
- †Tetrapassalus
  - †Tetrapassalus proius – type locality for species
- †Thamnotettix
  - †Thamnotettix gannetti – type locality for species
  - †Thamnotettix mutilata – type locality for species
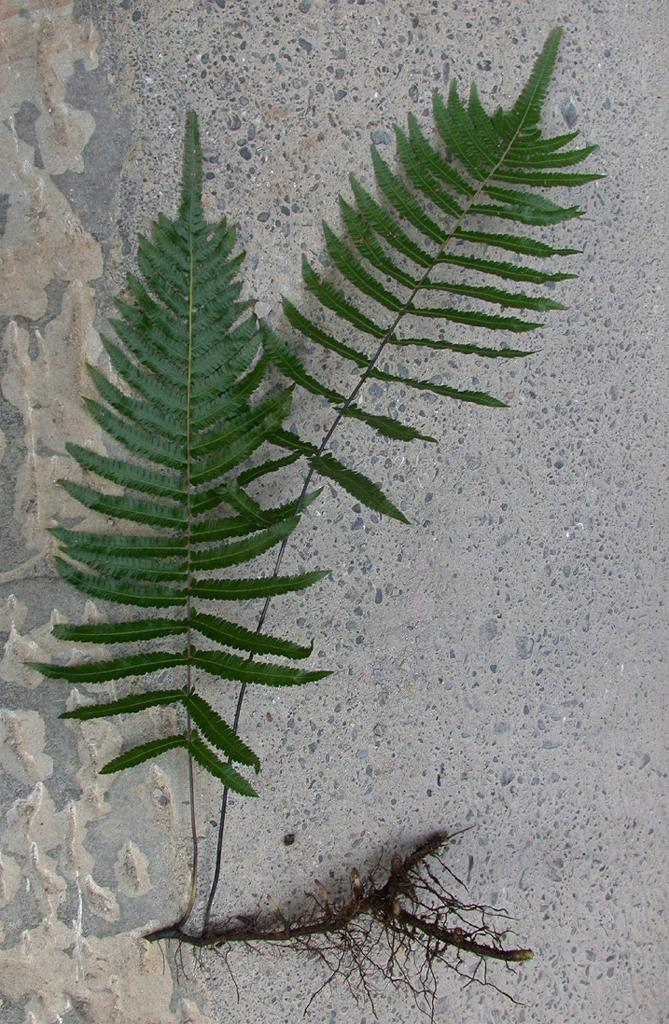
- A modern uprooted Thelypteris, or maiden fern
  Thelypteris
  - †Thelypteris iddingsi
  - †Thelypteris iddingsii
- †Thinocyon
- †Thisbemys
  - †Thisbemys brevicrista
  - †Thisbemys corrugatus – type locality for species
  - †Thisbemys perditus
- †Thouinia
  - †Thouinia eocenica
- †Thryptacodon
  - †Thryptacodon antiquus
  - †Thryptacodon australis
  - †Thryptacodon barae
  - †Thryptacodon orthogonius – type locality for species
  - †Thryptacodon pseudarctos
- †Thuites
  - †Thuites interruptus
- †Thuja
  - †Thuja interrupta
  - †Thuja interruptus
- †Thylacaelurus
  - †Thylacaelurus montanus – or unidentified comparable form
- †Thylacodon
  - †Thylacodon pusillus
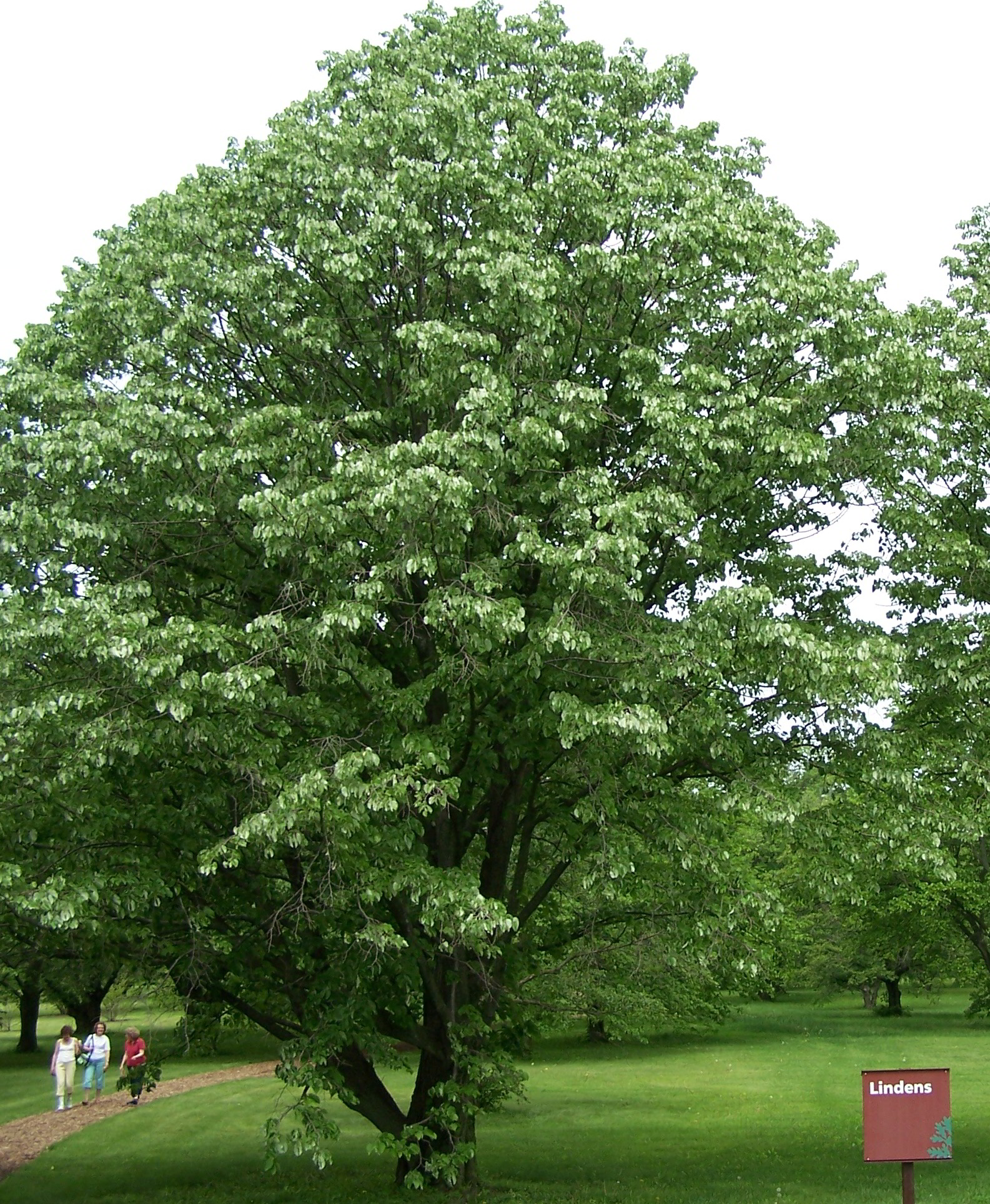
- A living member of Tilia, the genus including the lindens and basswoods
  Tilia
  - †Tilia populifolia
- †Tillodon
  - †Tillodon fodiens – type locality for species
- †Tillomys
  - †Tillomys parvidens – type locality for species
  - †Tillomys senex
- †Tinimomys
  - †Tinimomys graybulliensis
  - †Tinimomys loomisi
  - †Tinimomys tribos – type locality for species
- Tinosaurus – type locality for genus
  - †Tinosaurus pristinus – type locality for species
  - †Tinosaurus stenodon – type locality for species
- Tipula
  - †Tipula sepulchri – type locality for species
  - †Tipula spoliata – type locality for species
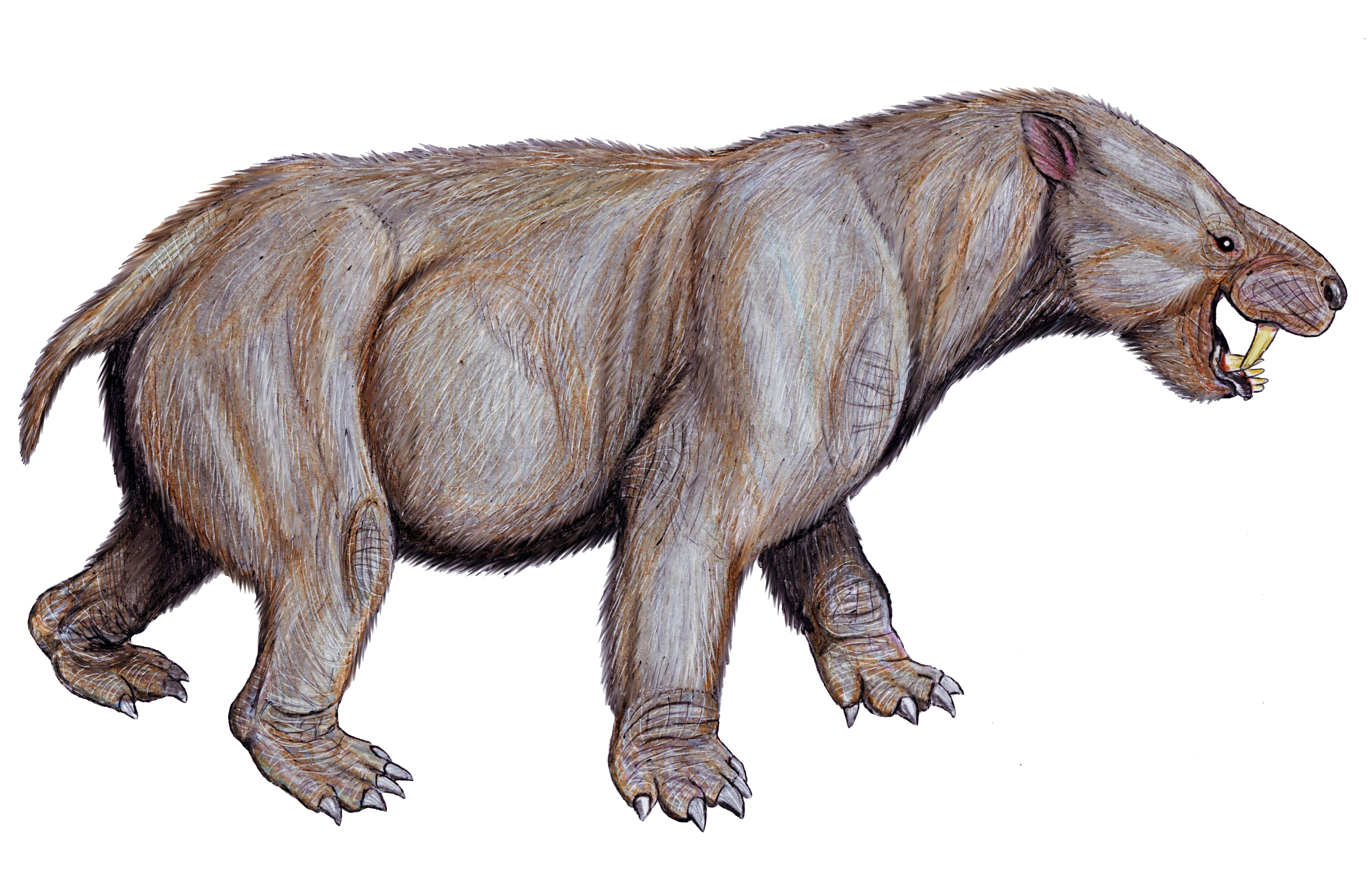
- Life restoration of the Paleocene pantodont mammal Titanoides
  †Titanoides
  - †Titanoides gidleyi – type locality for species
  - †Titanoides major
  - †Titanoides nanus – type locality for species
  - †Titanoides primaevus
- †Titanomyrma
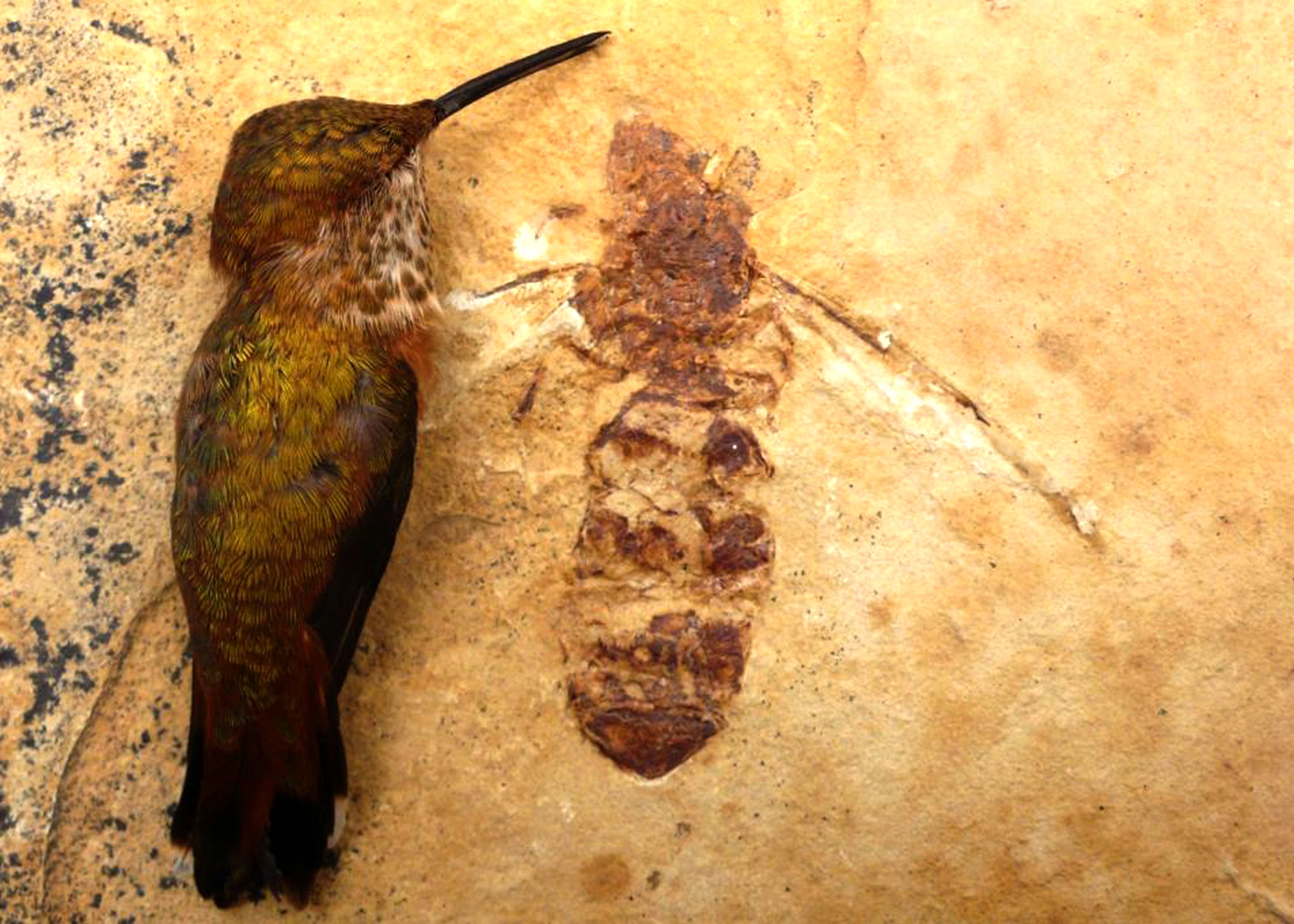
  - Titanomyrma lubei with a rufous hummingbird for scale
    †Titanomyrma lubei – type locality for species
- †Torrejonia
  - †Torrejonia sirokyi – type locality for species
- †Toxotherium
  - †Toxotherium hunteri
- Trapa
  - †Trapa angulata
  - †Trapa paulula
- †Tremanotus
  - †Tremanotus angustata
- †Triatriopollenites
  - †Triatriopollenites granulatus
  - †Triatriopollenites granulus
- †Tricalpites
  - †Tricalpites parvus
- †Tricentes
  - †Tricentes subtrigonus
- †Tricolpites
  - †Tricolpites anguloluminosus + bathyreticulatus
  - †Tricolpites anguloluminosus + bothyreticulatus
  - †Tricolpites angulolumonosus + bathyreticulatus
  - †Tricolpites mutabilis
  - †Tricolpites parvus
- †Trigenicus
  - †Trigenicus profectus
- †Trigonias
  - †Trigonias osborni
- †Trigonorhinus
  - †Trigonorhinus pristinus – type locality for species
- Trionyx
  - †Trionyx concentricus – type locality for species
  - †Trionyx thomasii – type locality for species
- †Triplopus
  - †Triplopus cubitalis – type locality for species
  - †Triplopus implicatus – type locality for species
  - †Triplopus obliquidens – or unidentified comparable form
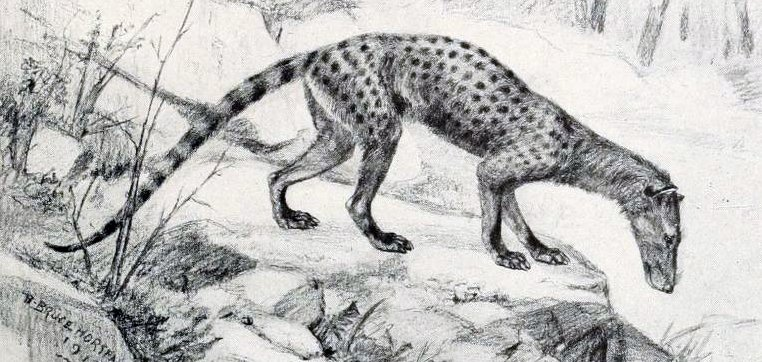
- Life restoration of the Eocene creodont mammal Tritemnodon
  †Tritemnodon
  - †Tritemnodon strenuus
- †Tritoma
  - †Tritoma binotata – type locality for species
- †Triumfetta
  - †Triumfetta ovata
- †Trochodendroides
  - †Trochodendroides flabella
- †Trogolemur
  - †Trogolemur amplior – type locality for species
  - †Trogolemur fragilis – type locality for species
  - †Trogolemur myodes – type locality for species
- †Trogosus
  - †Trogosus castoridens – type locality for species
  - †Trogosus gazini – type locality for species
  - †Trogosus latidens
- †Tropideres
  - †Tropideres remotus – type locality for species
- †Tropisternus
  - †Tropisternus saxialis – type locality for species
  - †Tropisternus sculptilis – type locality for species
- †Trypodendron
  - †Trypodendron impressus – type locality for species
- †Tsoabichi – type locality for genus
  - †Tsoabichi greenriverensis – type locality for species
- †Tubulodon
  - †Tubulodon atopum
  - †Tubulodon pearcei
  - †Tubulodon taylori
  - †Tubulodon woodi
- Turdus – or unidentified comparable form
  - †Turdus migratorius
- †Tuscahomys
  - †Tuscahomys ctenodactylops – type locality for species
  - †Tuscahomys major – or unidentified comparable form
  - †Tuscahomys walshi – type locality for species
  - †Tuscahomys worlandensis
- †Tylocephalonyx
  - †Tylocephalonyx skinneri
- Tympanuchus
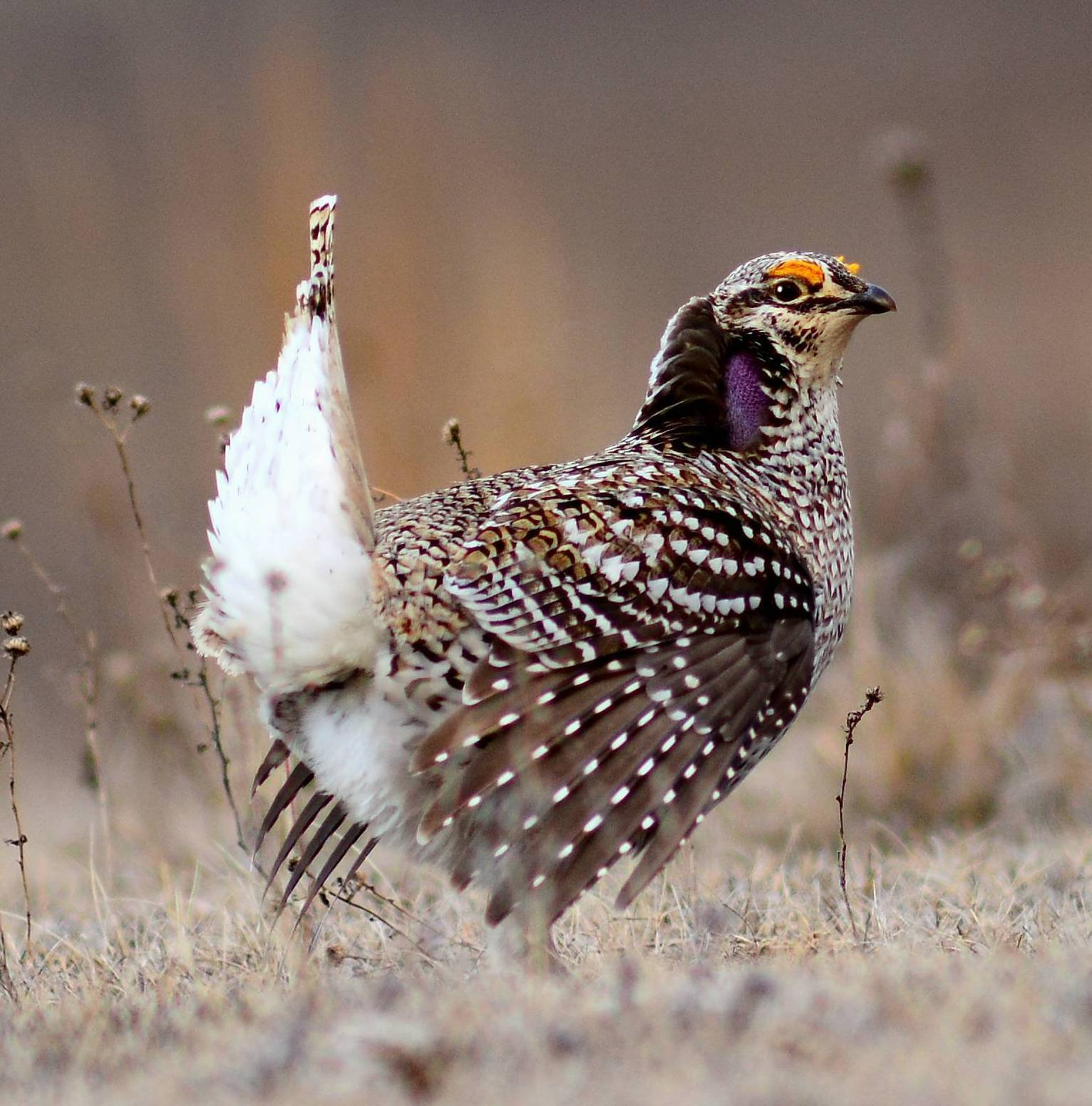
  - A living Tympanuchus phasianellus, or sharp-tailed grouse
    †Tympanuchus phasianellus
- Typha – or unidentified related form
- †Tytthaena
  - †Tytthaena lichna
  - †Tytthaena parrisi – type locality for species

== U ==
- †Uintaceras
  - †Uintaceras radinskyi
- †Uintacyon
  - †Uintacyon asodes
  - †Uintacyon gingerichi
  - †Uintacyon jugulans – type locality for species
  - †Uintacyon massetericus
  - †Uintacyon rudis
- †Uintanius
  - †Uintanius ameghini
  - †Uintanius rutherfurdi
- †Uintasorex
  - †Uintasorex parvulus – type locality for species
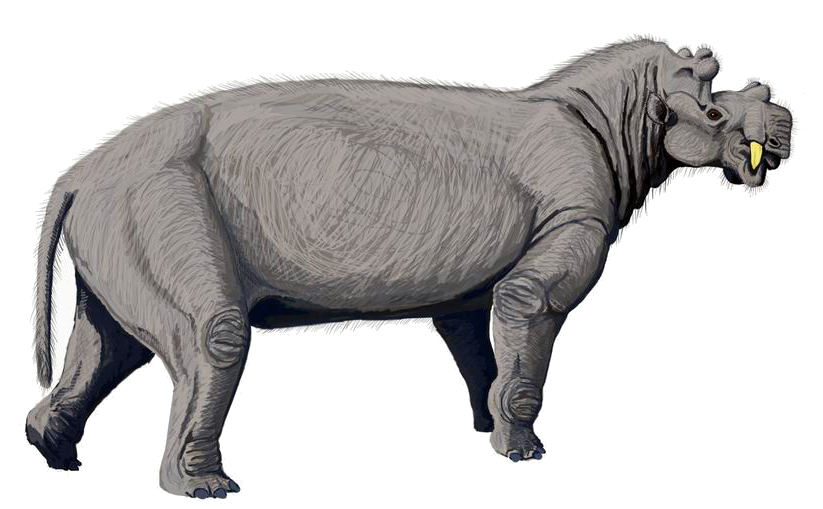
- Life restoration of the Eocene mammal Uintatherium
  †Uintatherium – type locality for genus
  - †Uintatherium anceps – type locality for species
- †Uintornis – type locality for genus
  - †Uintornis lucaris – type locality for species
  - †Uintornis marionae – type locality for species
- Ulmus
  - †Ulmus microphylla
  - †Ulmus minima – tentative report
  - †Ulmus rhamnifolia
- Unio
- †Unuchinia
  - †Unuchinia diaphanes – type locality for species
  - †Unuchinia dysmathes
- Ursus
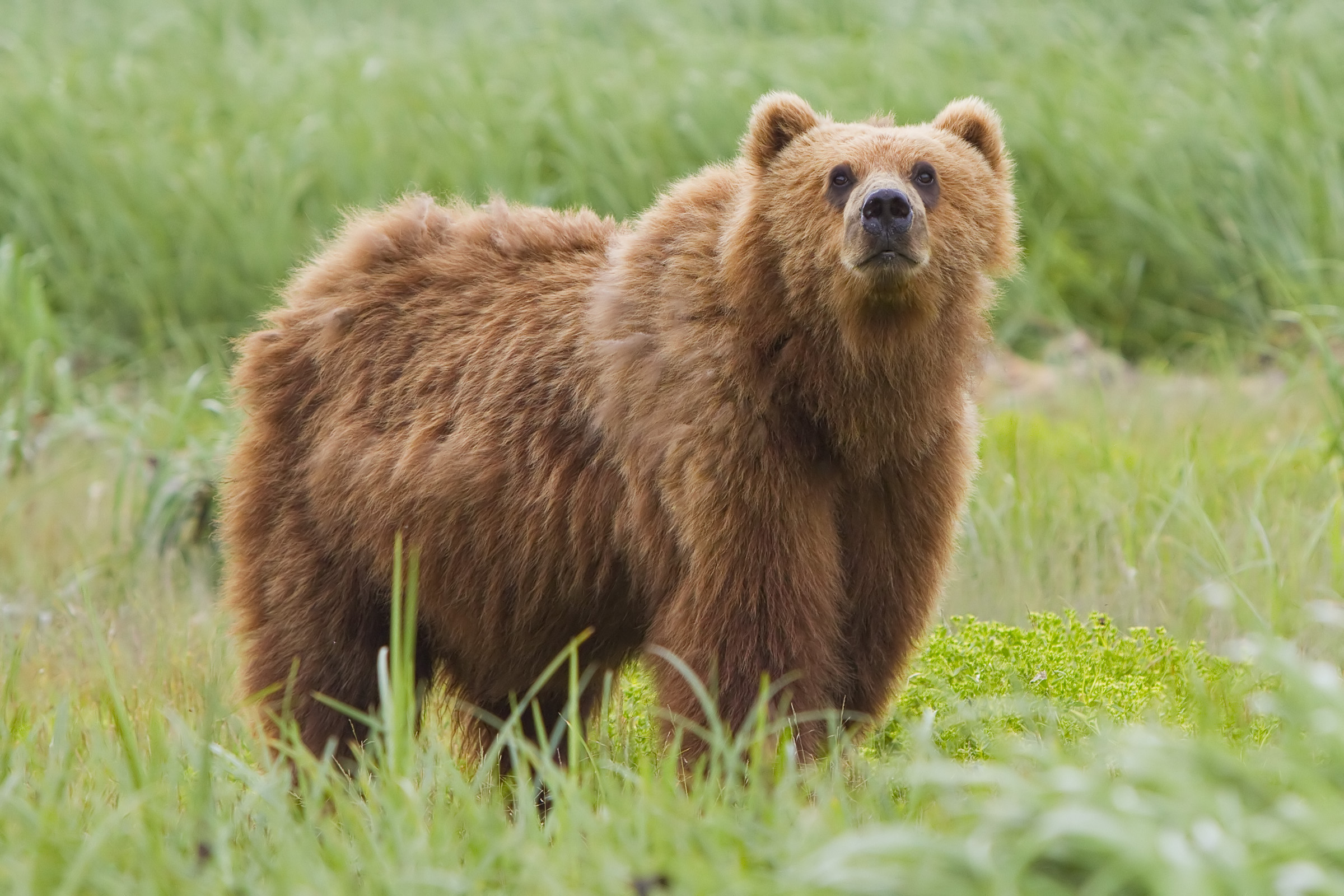
  - A living Ursus arctos, or brown bear
    †Ursus arctos
- †Ustatochoerus
  - †Ustatochoerus medius
- †Utahia
  - †Utahia carina – type locality for species
- †Utemylus
  - †Utemylus serior – type locality for species

== V ==
- †Valenia
  - †Valenia wilsoni
- †Valenopsalis
  - †Valenopsalis joyneri
- †Vassacyon
  - †Vassacyon bowni – type locality for species
  - †Vassacyon promicrodon
- †Vauquelinia
  - †Vauquelinia comptonifolia
- †Viburnum
  - †Viburnum antiquorum
  - †Viburnum antiquum
  - †Viburnum asperum
- †Vinea – or unidentified comparable form
  - †Vinea pugetensis
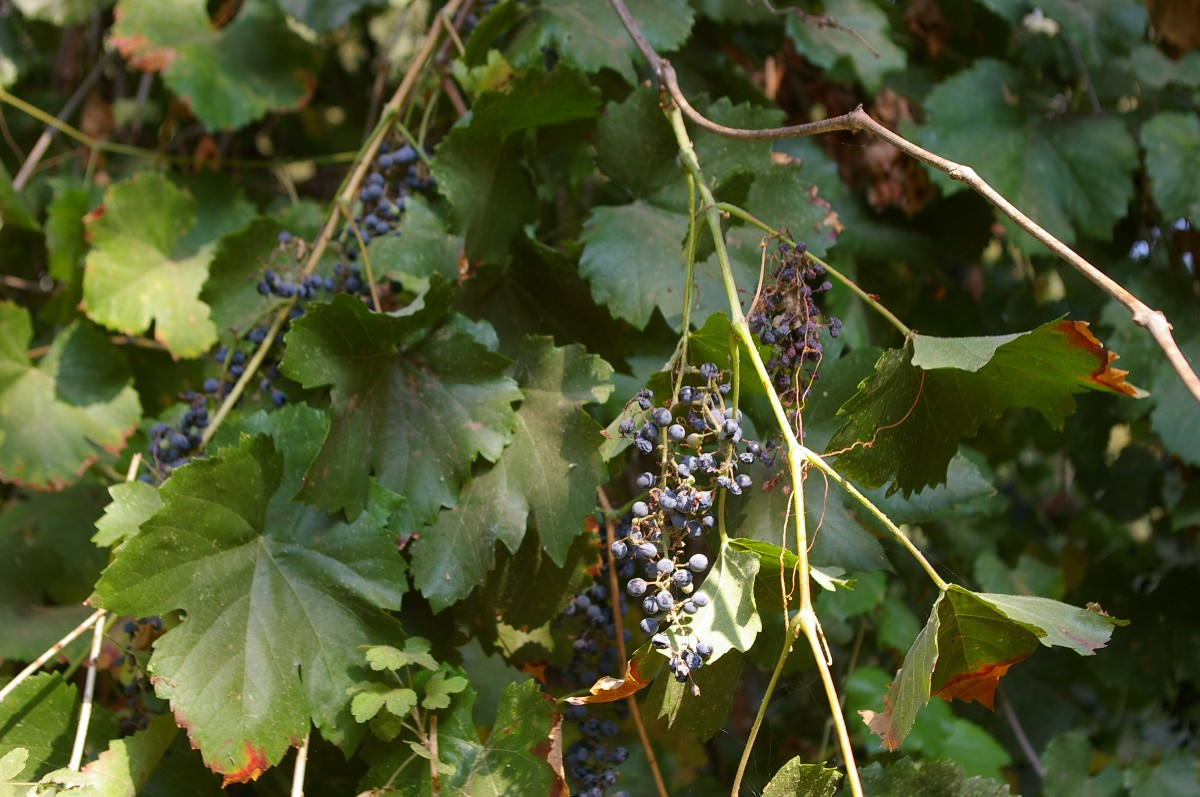
- Leaves and fruit of a living Vitis, or grapevine
  Vitis
  - †Vitis olriki
  - †"Vitis" stantoni
- †Viverravus
  - †Viverravus acutus
  - †Viverravus acutus/gracilis informal
  - †Viverravus browni
  - †Viverravus gracilis – type locality for species
  - †Viverravus laytoni
  - †Viverravus lutosus
  - †Viverravus minutus – type locality for species
  - †Viverravus politus
  - †Viverravus rosei – type locality for species
  - †Viverravus sicarius
- Viviparus
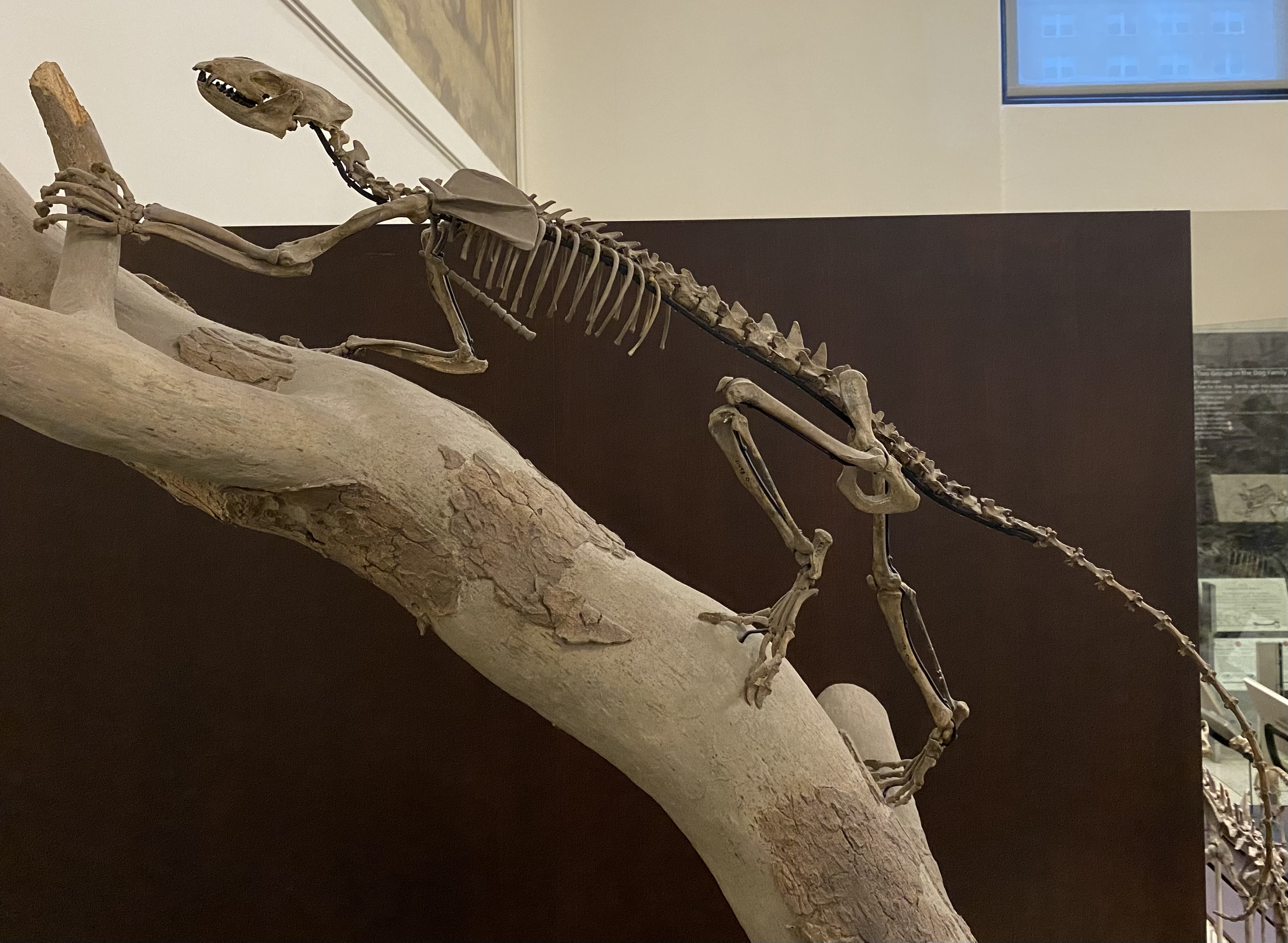
- Mounted fossilized skeleton of the Eocene mammal Vulpavus
  †Vulpavus
  - †Vulpavus australis
  - †Vulpavus canavus
  - †Vulpavus farsonensis – type locality for species
  - †Vulpavus hargeri
  - †Vulpavus ovatus – type locality for species
  - †Vulpavus palustris – type locality for species
  - †Vulpavus profectus – type locality for species
  - †Vulpavus simplex
- Vulpes
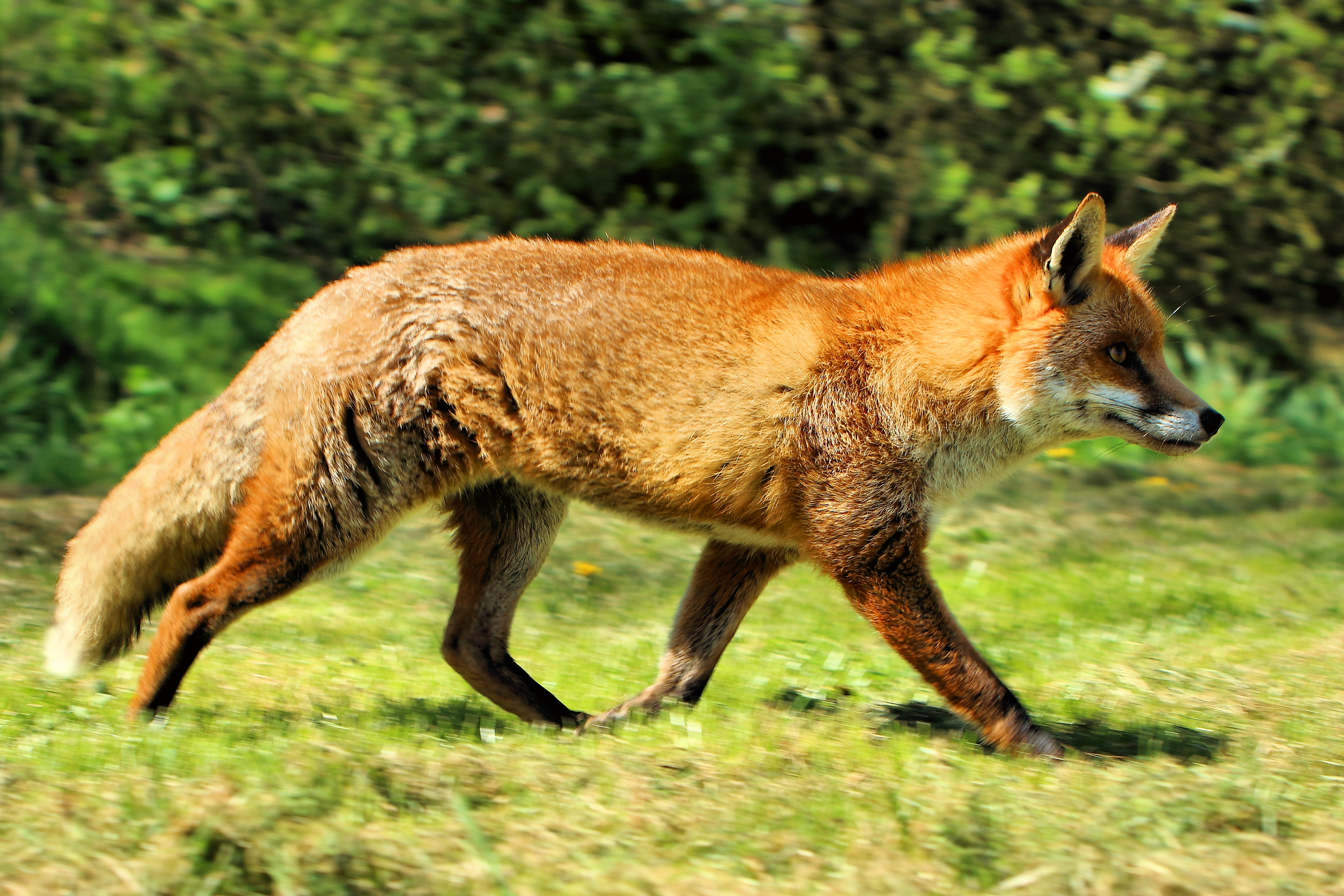
  - A living Vulpes vulpes, or red fox
    †Vulpes vulpes

== W ==
- †Washakius
  - †Washakius insignis
  - †Washakius izetti
- †Wickia
  - †Wickia brevirhinus – or unidentified comparable form
- †Wilsoneumys
  - †Wilsoneumys planidens
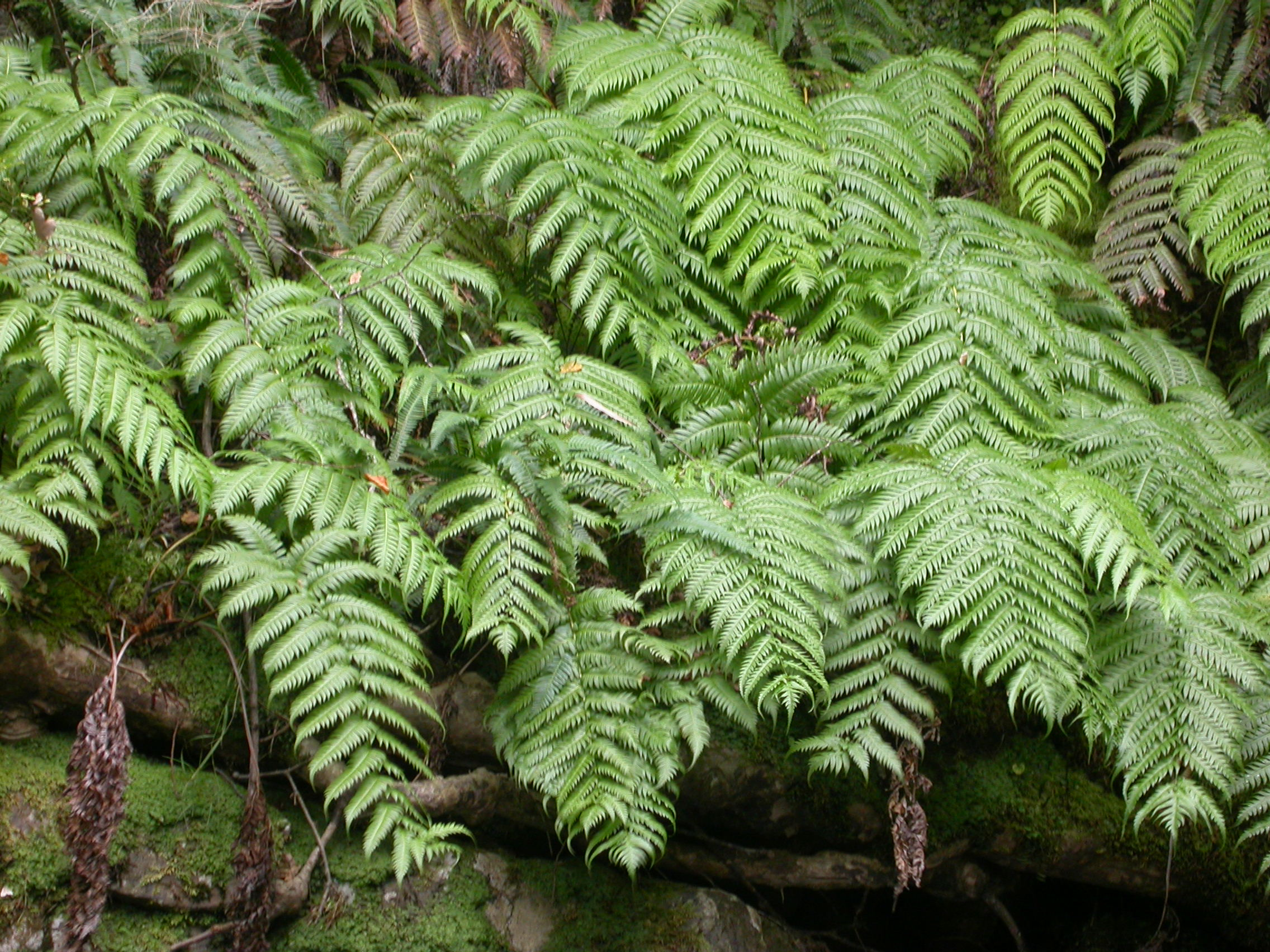
- Living Woodwardia ferns
  †Woodwardia
  - †Woodwardia arctica
  - †Woodwardia gravida
  - †Woodwardia preareolata
- †Worlandia
  - †Worlandia inusitata – type locality for species
- †Wrightohyus
  - †Wrightohyus yatkolai
- †Wyolestes
  - †Wyolestes apheles
  - †Wyolestes dioctes – type locality for species
- †Wyomomys
  - †Wyomomys bridgeri – type locality for species
- †Wyomylus – type locality for genus
  - †Wyomylus whitei – type locality for species
- †Wyonycteris – type locality for genus
  - †Wyonycteris chalix – type locality for species

== X ==
- †Xanclomys
  - †Xanclomys mcgrewi – type locality for species
- †Xenicohippus
  - †Xenicohippus craspedotum
  - †Xenicohippus grangeri
- †Xenochelys
  - †Xenochelys bridgerensis – type locality for species
  - †Xenochelys formosa
  - †Xenochelys lostcabinensis – type locality for species
- †Xenocranium
- †Xestops
  - †Xestops gracilis – type locality for species
  - †Xestops lentus – type locality for species
  - †Xestops microdus – type locality for species
  - †Xestops minutus – type locality for species
  - †Xestops piercei – type locality for species
  - †Xestops savagei – type locality for species
  - †Xestops vagans – type locality for species
  - †Xestops vagrans
- †Xyronomys
  - †Xyronomys swainae – type locality for species

== Y ==
- †Yoderimys – type locality for genus
  - †Yoderimys bumpi – type locality for species
  - †Yoderimys stewarti
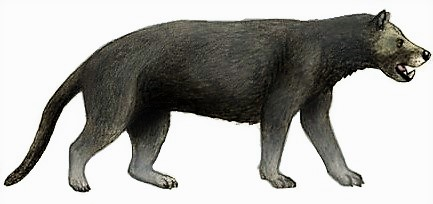
- Life restoration of the Miocene bear dog Ysengrinia
  †Ysengrinia
  - †Ysengrinia americana

== Z ==
- †Zamia
  - †Zamia coloradensis
  - †Zamia colorodensis
  - †Zamia wyomingensis
- †Zangerlichelys
  - †Zangerlichelys aequa
- †Zanycteris
  - †Zanycteris paleocenus
- Zelkova
  - †Zelkova nervosa
- †Zemiodontomys
  - †Zemiodontomys burkei
- Zenaida
  - †Zenaida rnacroura
- †Ziamys – or unidentified comparable form
- †Zingiberopsis
  - †Zingiberopsis isonervosa
- Zizyphus
  - †Zizyphus serrulatus
- †Zodiolestes
- Zonotrichia
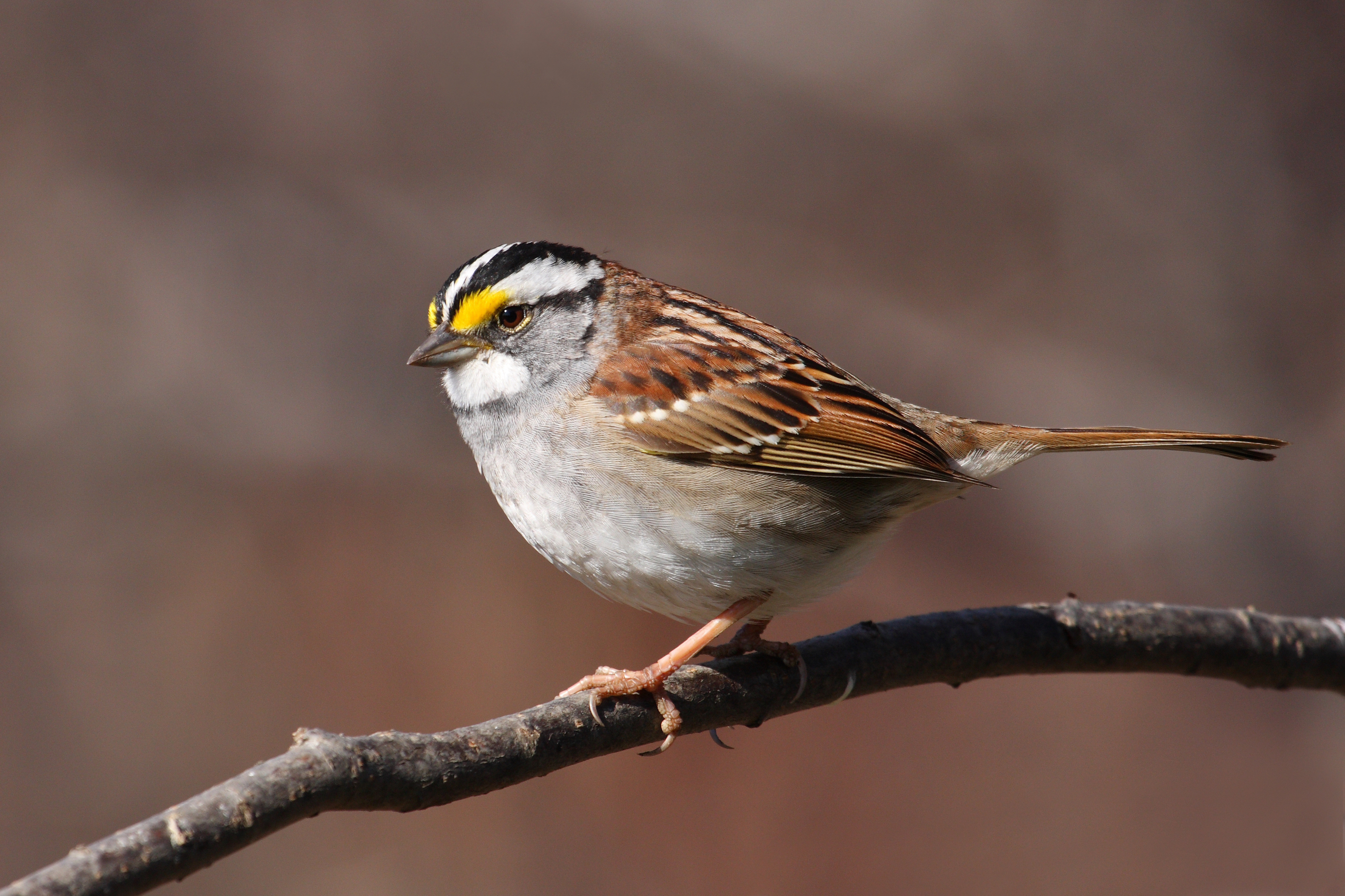
  - A living Zonotrichia albicollis, or white-throated sparrow
    †Zonotrichia albicollis
