= List of the Cenozoic life of Nevada =

This list of the Cenozoic life of Nevada contains the various prehistoric life-forms whose fossilized remains have been reported from within the US state of Nevada and are between 66 million and 10,000 years of age.

== A ==
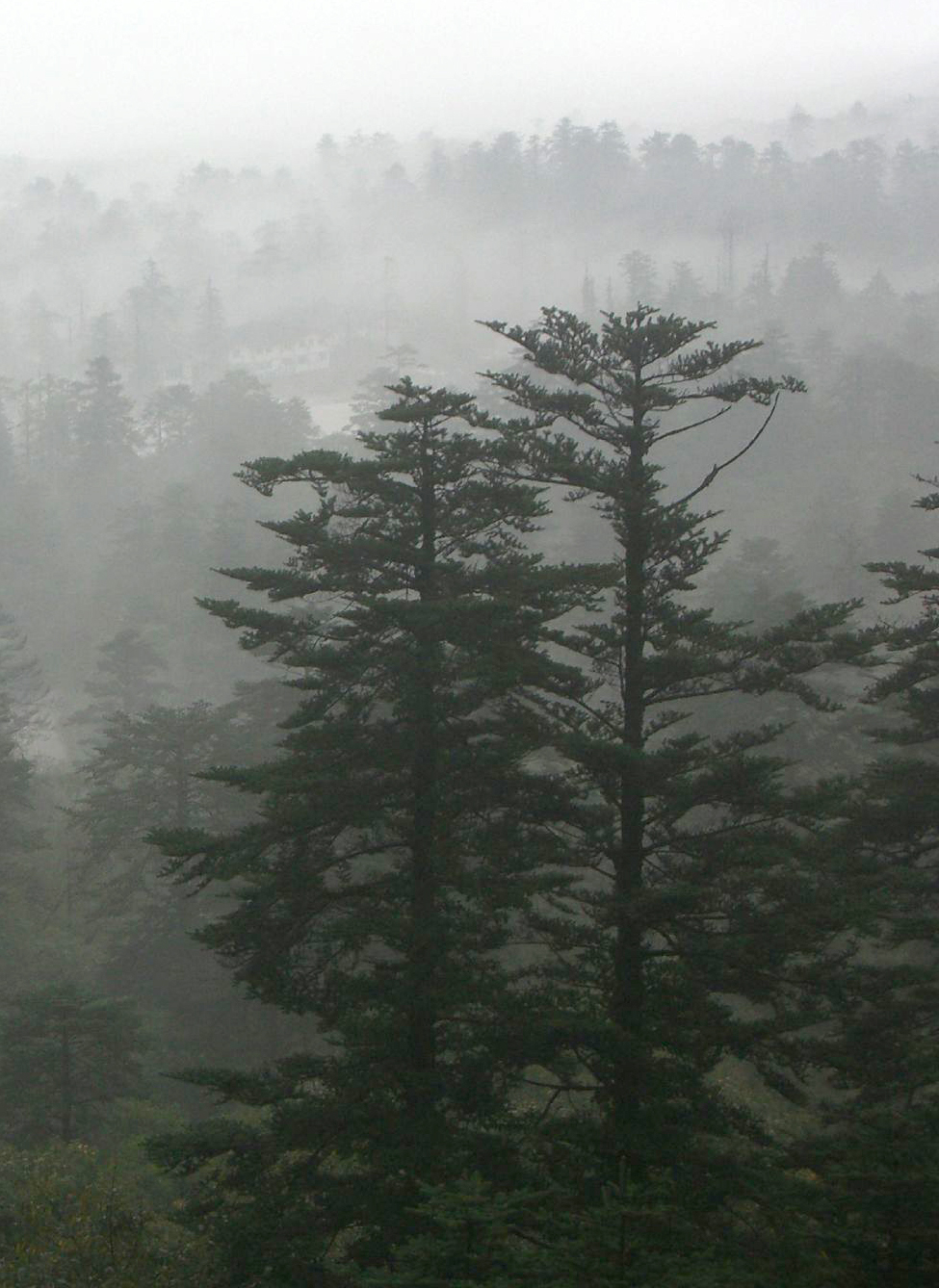
- Living Abies, or fir trees
  Abies
  - †Abies concoloroides
  - †Abies klamathensis
  - †Abies laticarpus
  - †Abies nevadensis
  - †Abies scherri
  - †Abies scherrii
- Acer
  - †Acer chaneyii
  - †Acer cyaneyii
  - †Acer glabroides
  - †Acer medianum
  - †Acer middlegatensis
  - †Acer negundoides
  - †Acer nevadensis
  - †Acer oregonianum
  - †Acer scottiae
  - †Acer septilobatum
  - †Acer trainii
  - †Acer tyrrelli
  - †Acer tyrrellii
- †Actiocyon
  - †Actiocyon parverratis – type locality for species
- †Aelurodon
  - †Aelurodon asthenostylus
  - †Aelurodon taxoides
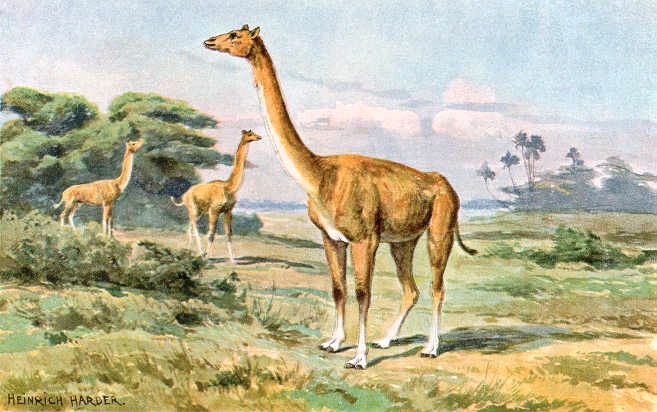
- Life restoration of the Miocene camel Aepycamelus, or the long-necked camel. Heinrich Harder (1920).
  †Aepycamelus
  - †Aepycamelus bradyi – type locality for species
  - †Aepycamelus robustus – or unidentified comparable form
  - †Aepycamelus stocki
- †Aesculus
  - †Aesculus ashleyi – type locality for species
  - †Aesculus preglabra
- †Agriotherium
- †Agulla
  - †Agulla mineralensis – type locality for species
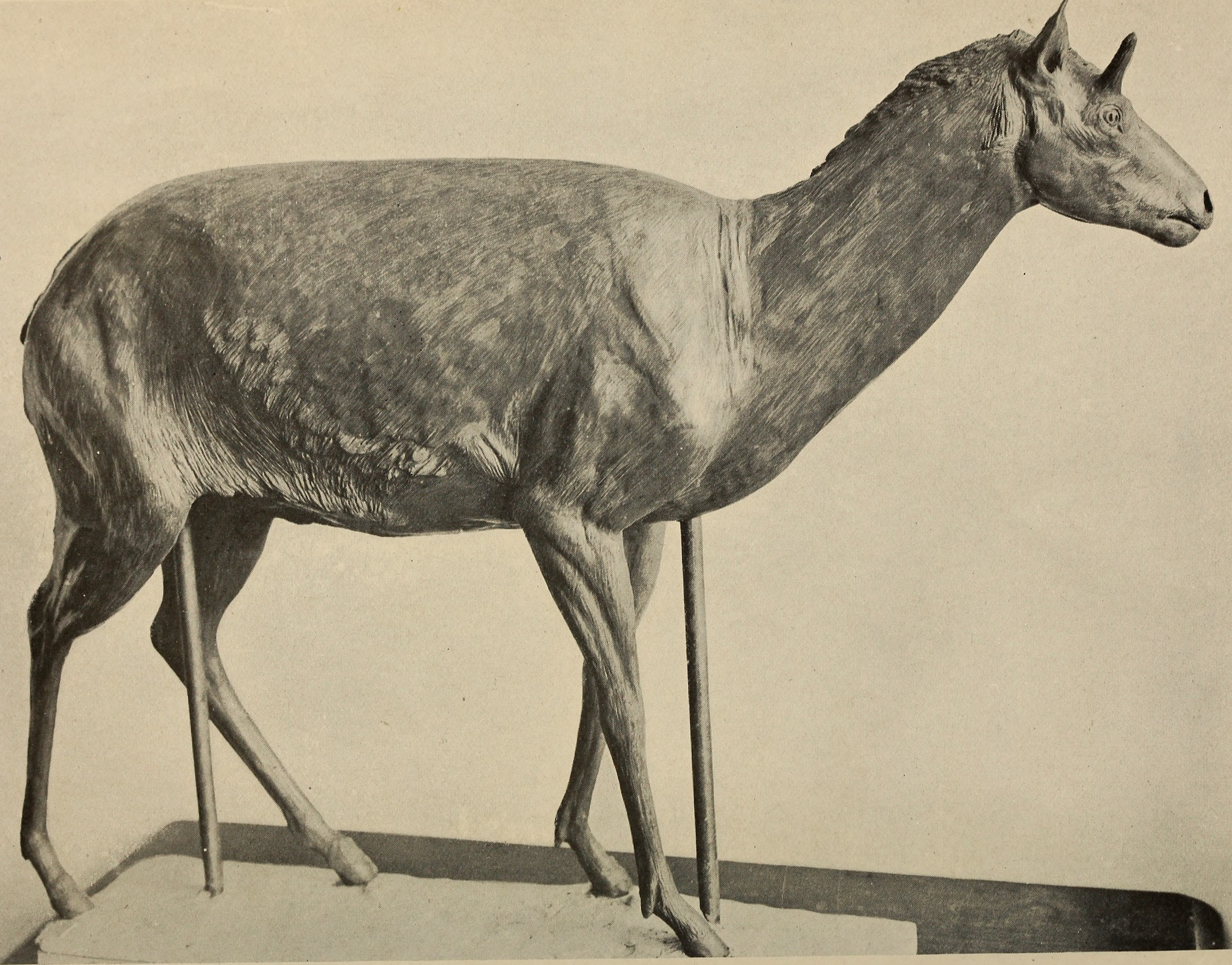
- Restorative model of the Miocene deer relative Aletomeryx
  †Aletomeryx
- †Alforjas
- †Alilepus
  - †Alilepus hibbardi
  - †Alilepus vagus
- †Allophaiomys
  - †Allophaiomys pliocaenicus
- †Alluvisorex
  - †Alluvisorex chasseae
- Alnus
  - †Alnus harneyana
  - †Alnus largei
  - †Alnus latahensis
  - †Alnus pyramidensis
  - †Alnus smithiana – type locality for species
  - †Alnus spokanensis
- †Alphagaulus
  - †Alphagaulus pristinus – or unidentified comparable form
  - †Alphagaulus vetus
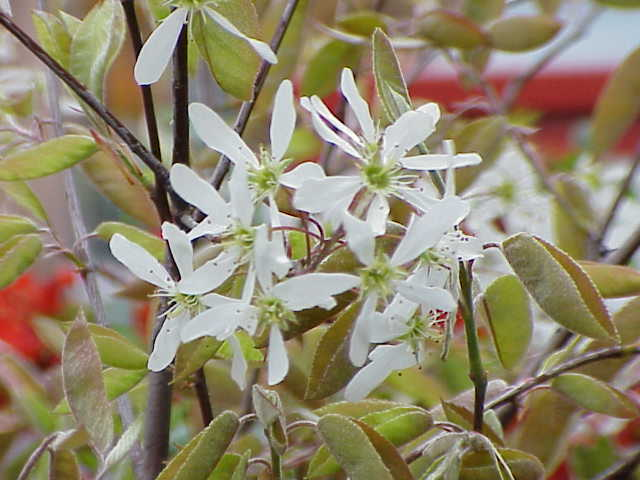
- Flowers and foliage of Amelanchier, or shadbush
  Amelanchier
  - †Amelanchier alvordensis
  - †Amelanchier apiculata
  - †Amelanchier desatoyana
  - †Amelanchier grayi
  - †Amelanchier nevadensis – type locality for species
- †Americaphis – type locality for genus
  - †Americaphis longipes – type locality for species
- †Amorpha
  - †Amorpha oblongifolia
  - †Amorpha stenophylla
- †Anchitheriomys
- †Ansomys
  - †Ansomys nevadensis – type locality for species
- †Antecalomys
  - †Antecalomys valensis
  - †Antecalomys vasquezi – or unidentified comparable form
- †Antiacodon
  - †Antiacodon pygmaeus
- Antrozous
  - †Antrozous pallidus
- †Apatemys
  - †Apatemys bellus
- †Aphelops
  - †Aphelops malacorhinus
  - †Aphelops megalodus
- †Apis
  - †Apis nearctica – type locality for species
- Arbutus
  - †Arbutus idahoensis
  - †Arbutus matthesii
  - †Arbutus menziesii
  - †Arbutus prexalapensis
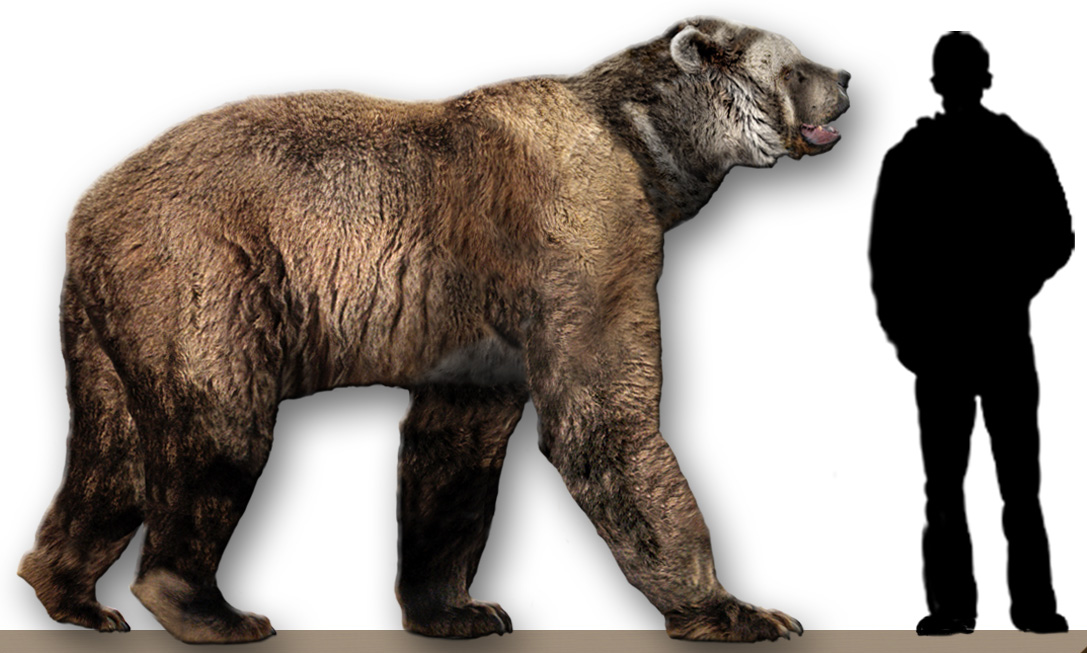
- Restoration of an Arctodus, or short-faced bear, with a human to scale
  †Arctodus
  - †Arctodus simus
- †Arctostaphylos
  - †Arctostaphylos verdiana
- †Astrohippus

== B ==
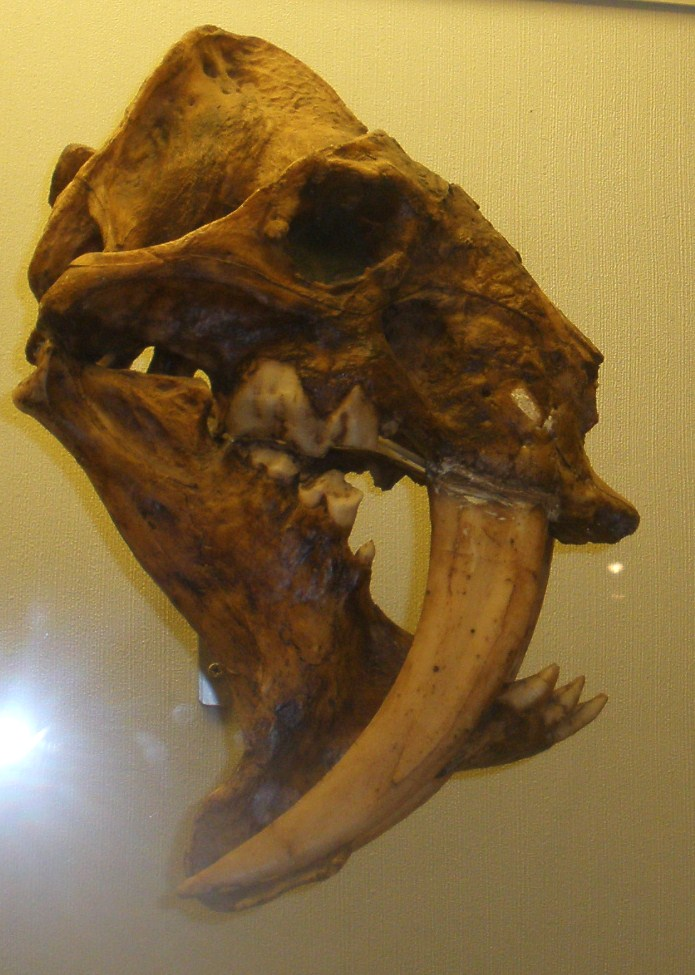
- Fossilized skull of the Miocene-Pliocene false saber-toothed cat Barbourofelis
  †Barbourofelis
  - †Barbourofelis fricki
- †Bassaricyonoides – type locality for genus
  - †Bassaricyonoides stewartae – type locality for species
- Bassariscus
  - †Bassariscus antiquus
- †Bensonomys
  - †Bensonomys arizonae – or unidentified comparable form
  - †Bensonomys coffeyi – or unidentified comparable form
  - †Bensonomys lindsayi – type locality for species
- Betula
  - †Betula ashleyi
  - †Betula ashleyii
  - †Betula desatoyana
  - †Betula idahoensis
  - †Betula smithiana
  - †Betula thor
  - †Betula vera
- †Borophagus
  - †Borophagus diversidens – or unidentified comparable form
- †Bouromeryx
  - †Bouromeryx americanus
  - †Bouromeryx submilleri
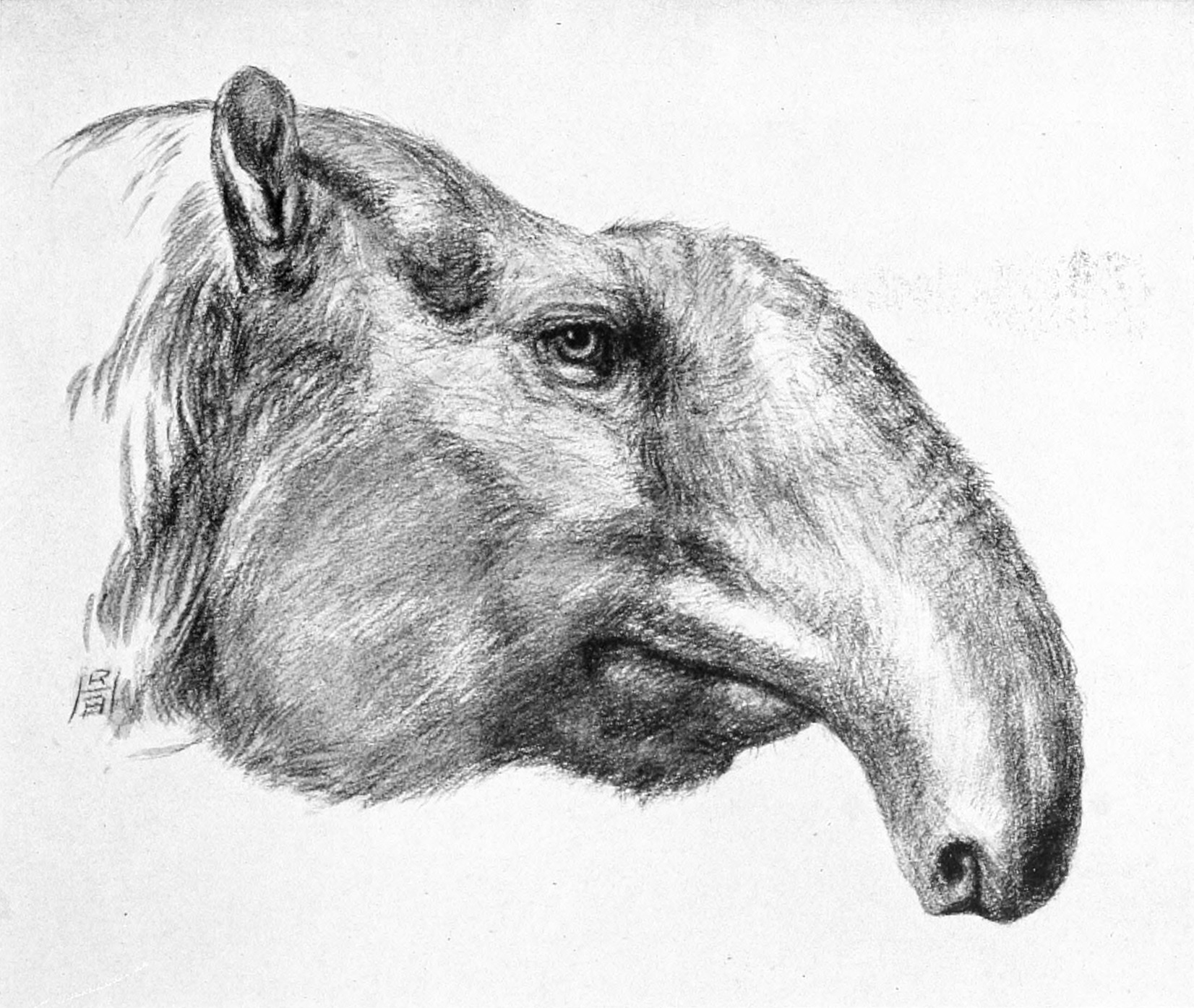
- Restorative portrait of the Miocene oreodont mammal Brachycrus
  †Brachycrus
- †Brachyerix
  - †Brachyerix incertis
- Brachylagus
  - †Brachylagus idahoensis
- †Brachypsalis
  - †Brachypsalis pachycephalus
- †Brevimalictis – type locality for genus
  - †Brevimalictis chikasha – type locality for species
- †Bumelia
  - †Bumelia beaverana

== C ==
- †Calocedrus
  - †Calocedrus masonii
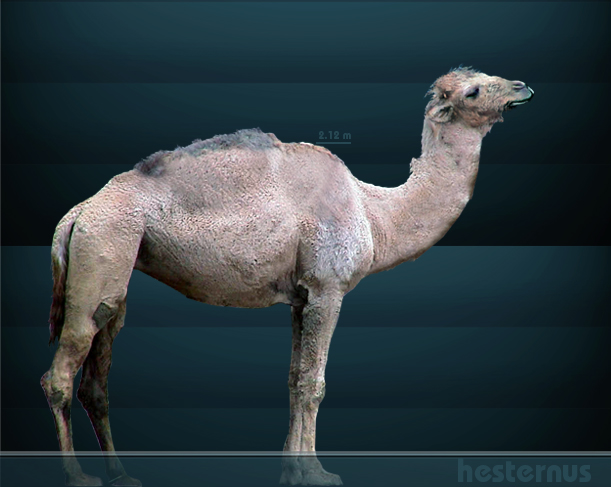
- Life restoration of the Pliocene-Holocene camel Camelops
  †Camelops – tentative report
- Candona
- Canis
  - †Canis latrans
  - †Canis lepophagus
- †Capricamelus
- †Carpocyon
  - †Carpocyon compressus
- Carya
  - †Carya bendirei
  - †Carya ovata
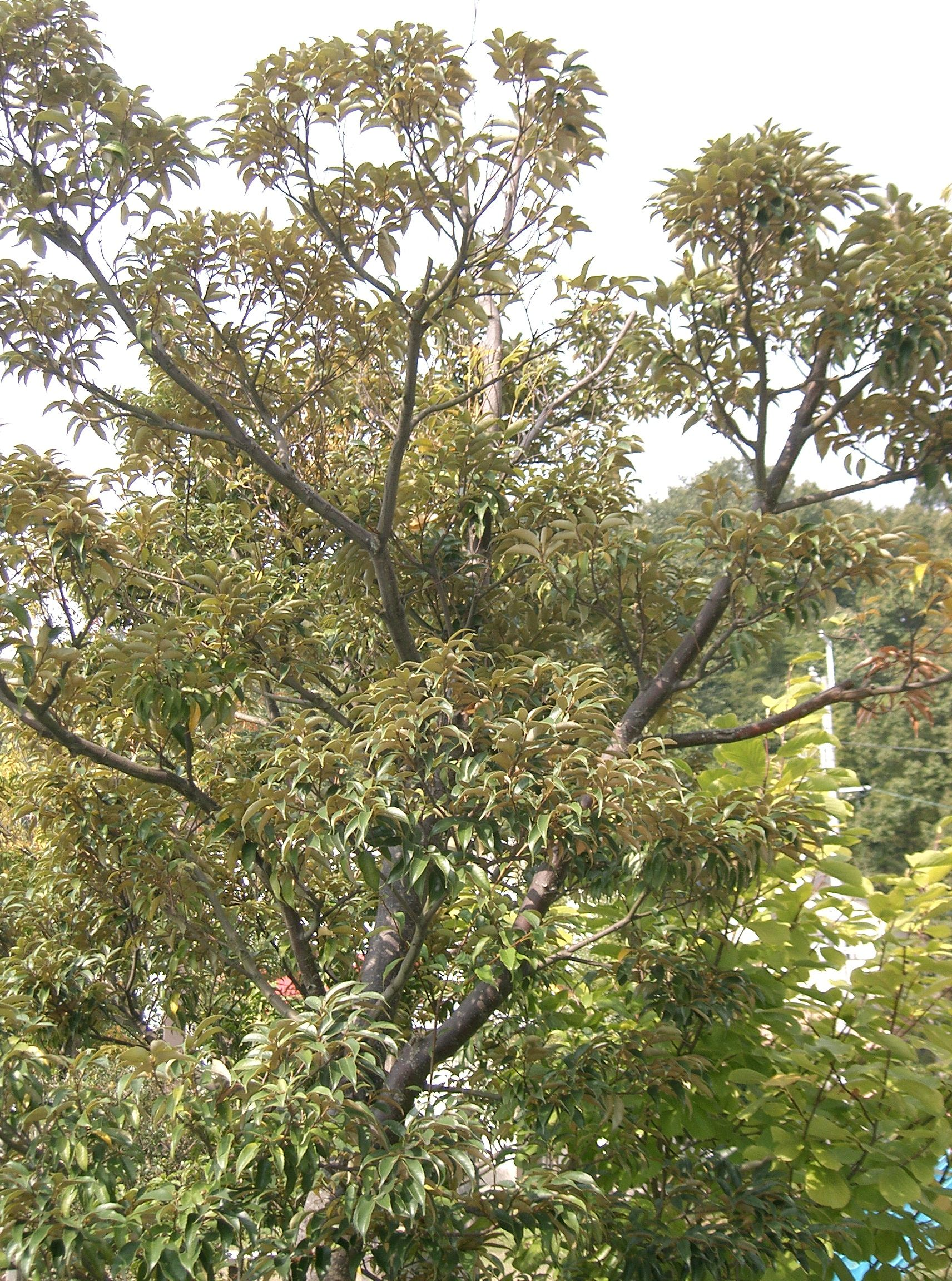
- Castanopsis
  Castanopsis
  - †Castanopsis sonomensis
- Ceanothus
  - †Ceanothus chaneyi
  - †Ceanothus leitchii
  - †Ceanothus precuneatus
- Cedrela
  - †Cedrela trainii
- †Ceratophyllum
  - †Ceratophyllum praedemersum
- Cercis
  - †Cercis carsoniana – type locality for species
- †Cercocarpus
  - †Cercocarpus antiquus
  - †Cercocarpus eastgatensis
  - †Cercocarpus linearifolius
  - †Cercocarpus nevadensis – type locality for species
  - †Cercocarpus ovatifolius
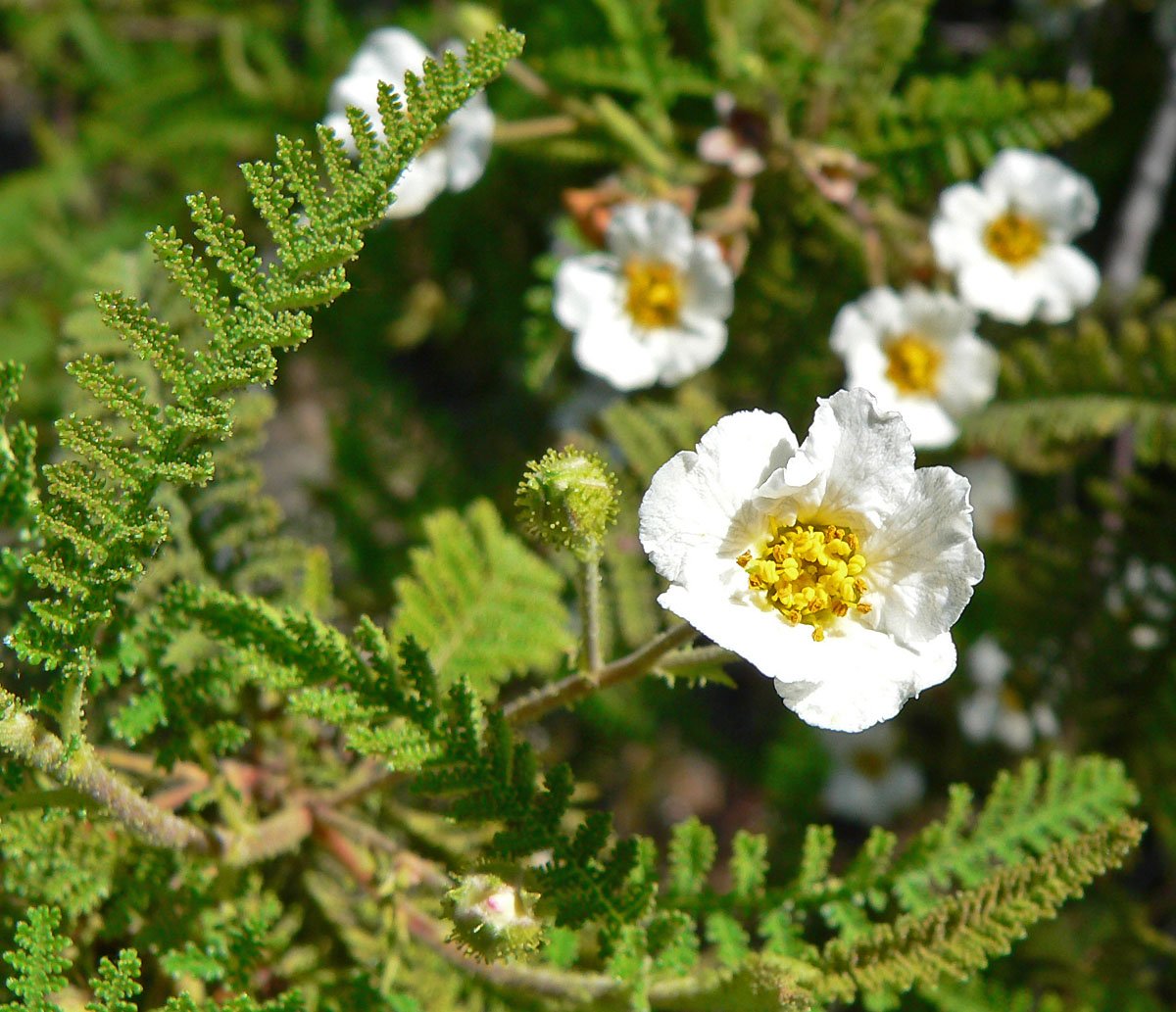
- Chamaebatia
  †Chamaebatia
  - †Chamaebatia nevadensis
- †Chamaecyparis
  - †Chamaecyparis cordillerae
  - †Chamaecyparis linguaefolia
- Chara
  - †Chara verdiana
- †Chrysolepis
  - †Chrysolepis convexa
  - †Chrysolepis sonomensis
- Cnemidophorus
  - †Cnemidophorus tigris
- Comptonia
  - †Comptonia parvifolia – type locality for species
- †Copemys
  - †Copemys esmeraldensis – type locality for species
  - †Copemys loxodon
- Cornus
  - †Cornus ovalis
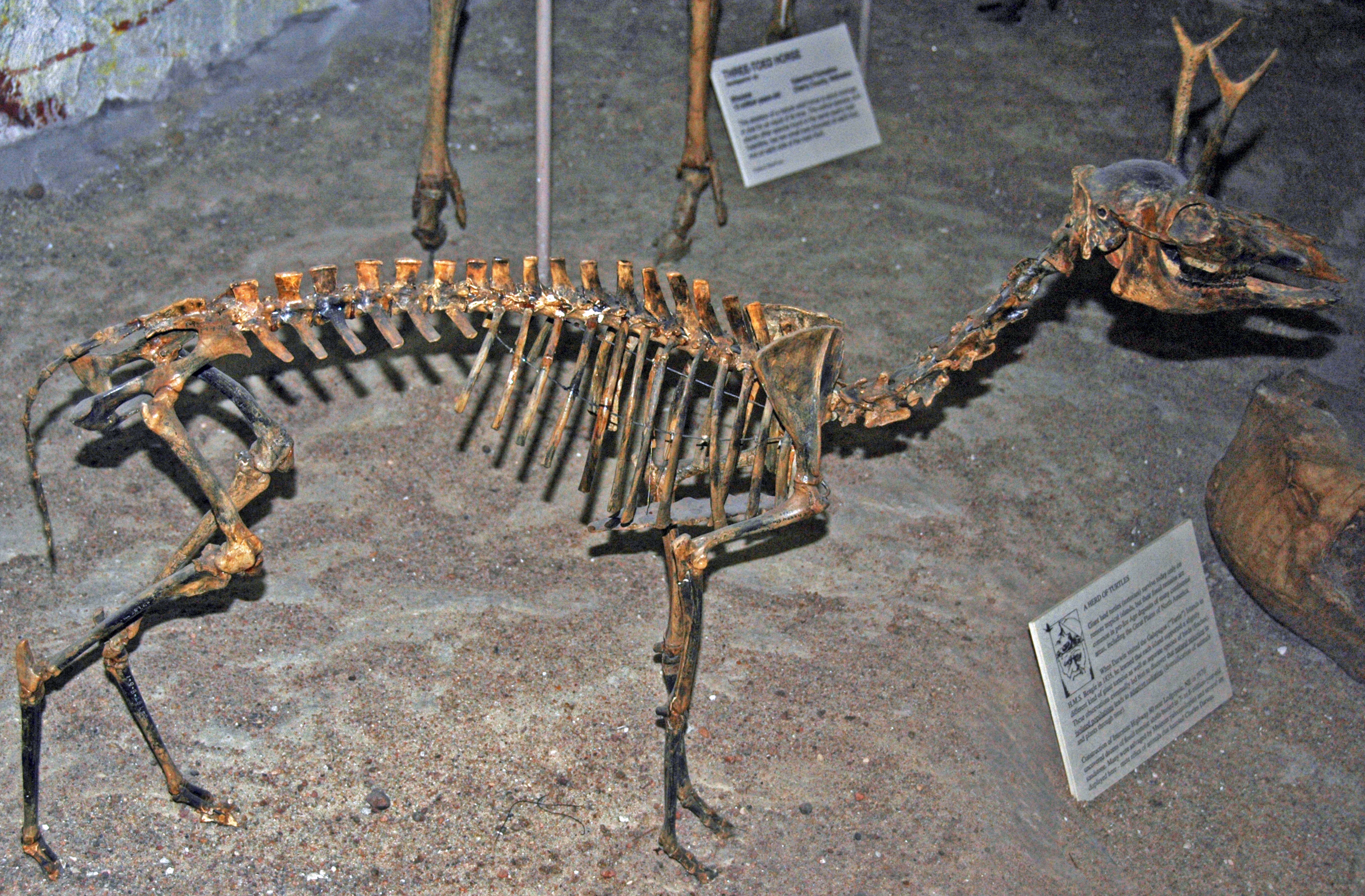
- Fossilized skeleton of the Miocene pronghorn-relative Cosoryx
  †Cosoryx
  - †Cosoryx furcatus
- Crataegus
  - †Crataegus gracilens
  - †Crataegus middlegatensis
  - †Crataegus newberryi
  - †Crataegus pacifica
- Crotalus
  - †Crotalus atrox
  - †Crotalus mitchelli
  - †Crotalus viridis
- Crotaphytus
  - †Crotaphytus collaris
- †Cupidinimus
  - †Cupidinimus cuyamensis
  - †Cupidinimus magnus
  - †Cupidinimus tertius
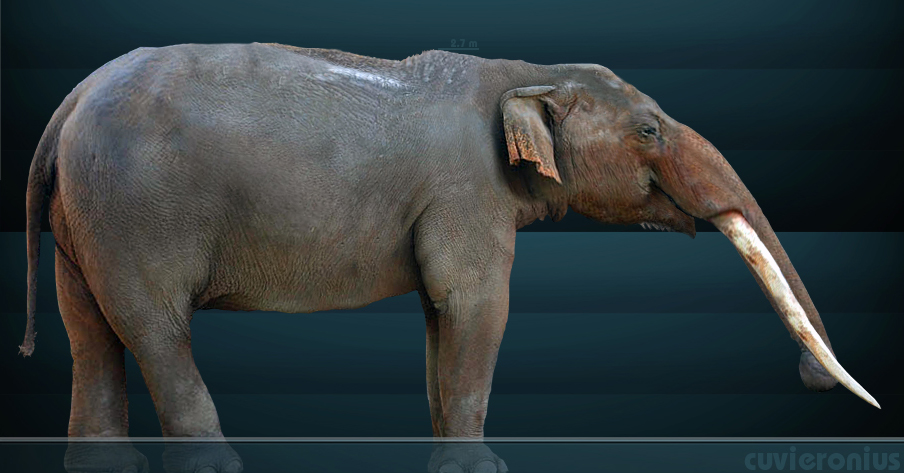
- Life restoration of the Pliocene-Holocene elephant relative Cuvieronius
  †Cuvieronius – tentative report

== D ==
- †Desmathyus
  - †Desmathyus pinensis
- †Desmatippus
  - †Desmatippus avus – or unidentified comparable form
- †Diceratherium – or unidentified comparable form
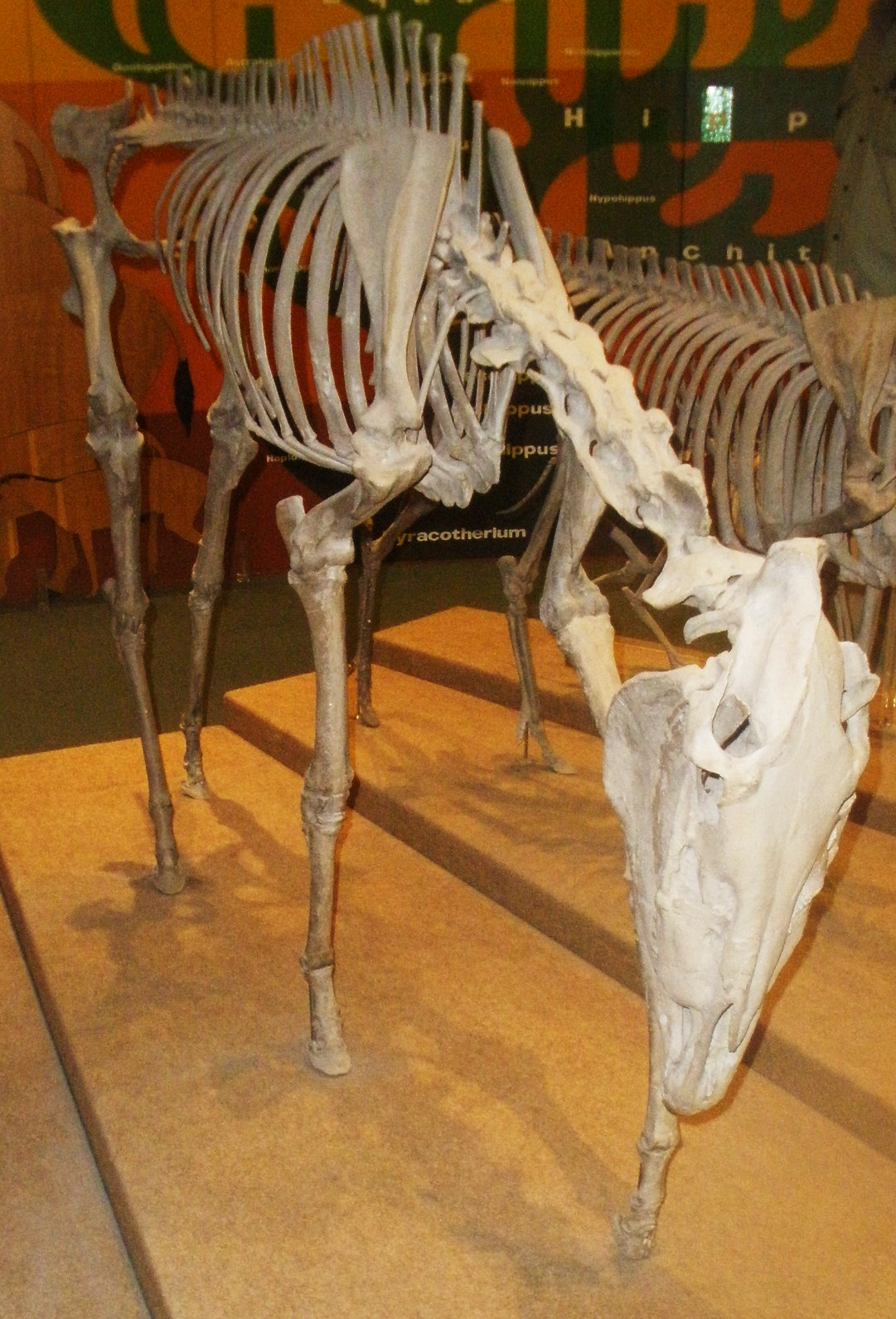
- Mounted fossilized skeleton of the Miocene-Pliocene horse Dinohippus
  †Dinohippus
- †Diospyros
  - †Diospyros oregonianum
- Dipodomys
  - †Dipodomys gidleyi
- †Dipoides
  - †Dipoides stirtoni – or unidentified comparable form
  - †Dipoides wilsoni – or unidentified comparable form
- †Diprionomys
  - †Diprionomys minimus – type locality for species
  - †Diprionomys parvus – type locality for species
- †Domninoides
  - †Domninoides riparensis – or unidentified comparable form
- †Dromomeryx
  - †Dromomeryx borealis

== E ==
- †Elkobatrachus – type locality for genus
  - †Elkobatrachus brocki – type locality for species
- †Elymys
  - †Elymys complexus
- †Eorubeta – type locality for genus
  - †Eorubeta nevadensis – type locality for species
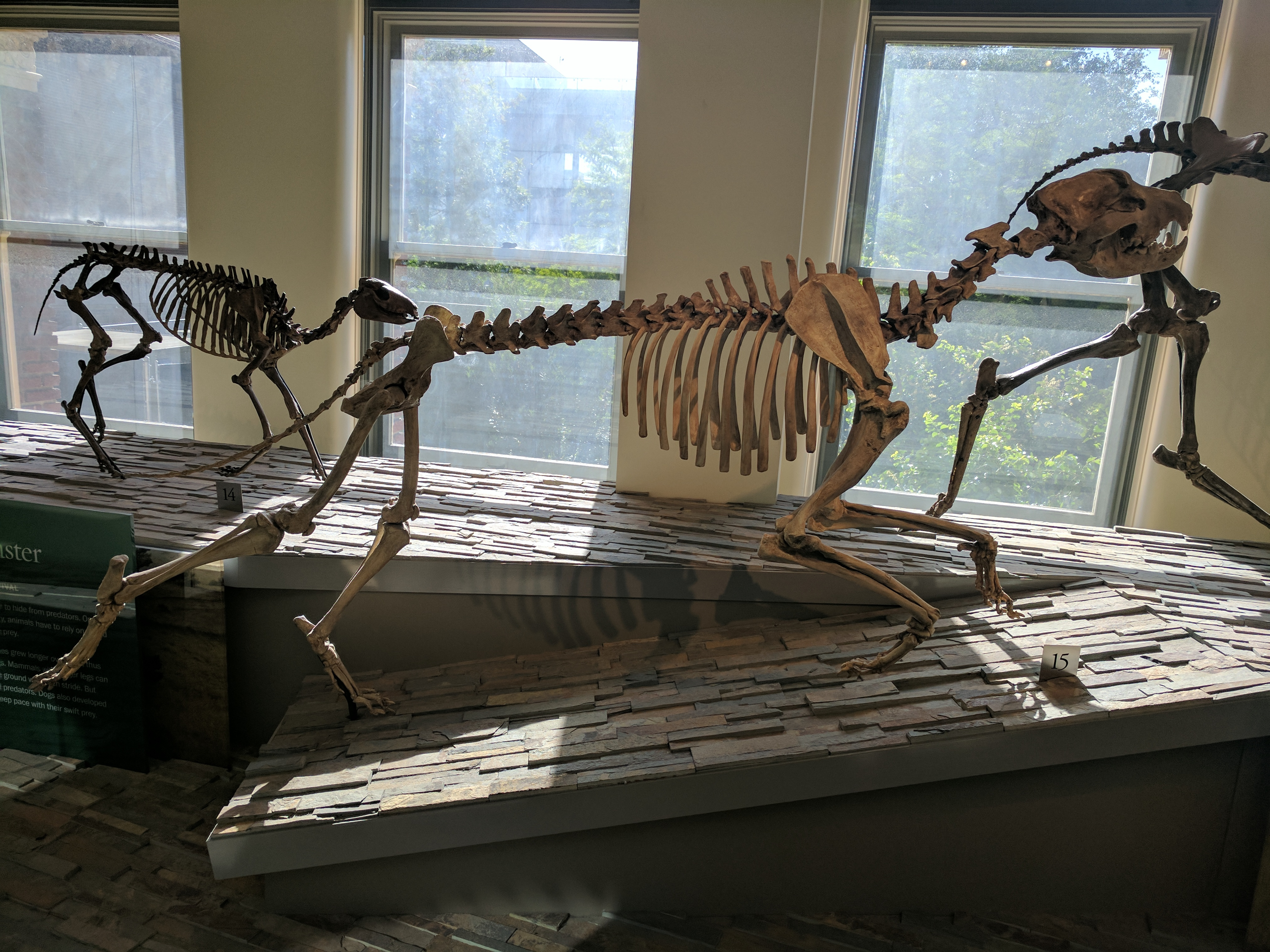
- Mounted fossilized skeleton of the Miocene bone-crushing dog Epicyon
  †Epicyon
  - †Epicyon saevus
- †Equisetum
  - †Equisetum alexanderi
- Equus
  - †Equus giganteus
  - †Equus idahoensis
  - †Equus simplicidens
- †Eriosaphis – type locality for genus
  - †Eriosaphis leei – type locality for species
- †Eriosomaphis – type locality for genus
  - †Eriosomaphis jesperi – type locality for species
  - †Eriosomaphis occidentalis – type locality for species
- †Eucastor
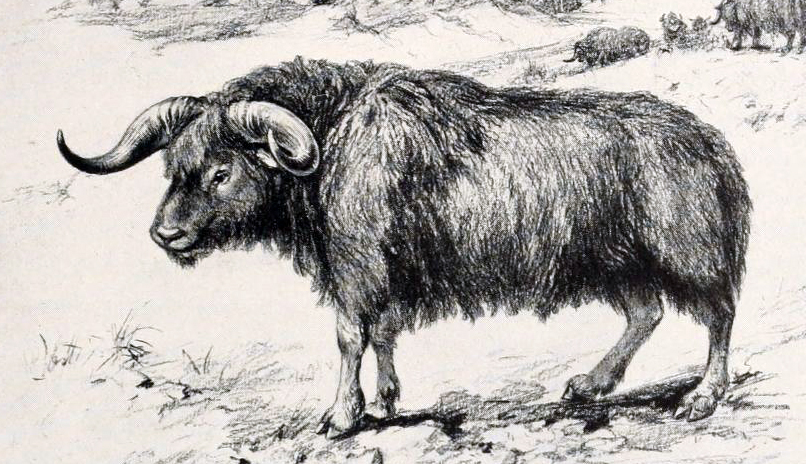
- Life restoration of the Pleistocene bovid Euceratherium, or the shrub ox. Robert Bruce Horsfall (1913).
  †Euceratherium
  - †Euceratherium collinum
- †Eucyon
  - †Eucyon davisi
- Eugenia
  - †Eugenia nevadensis

== F ==
- †Fouchia
  - †Fouchia elyensis
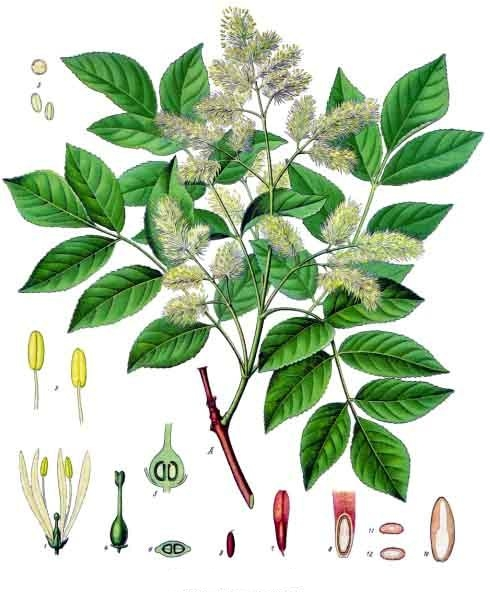
- Illustrations of the flowers and foliage of a living Fraxinus, or ash tree, with insets further detailing its anatomy
  †Fraxinus
  - †Fraxinus alcorni – type locality for species
  - †Fraxinus caudata
  - †Fraxinus coulteri
  - †Fraxinus desatoyana
  - †Fraxinus eastgatensis
  - †Fraxinus millsiana

== G ==
- Gambelia
- †Garrya
  - †Garrya idahoensis
- †Gigantocamelus
  - †Gigantocamelus spatulus
- Glyptostrobus
  - †Glyptostrobus oregonensis
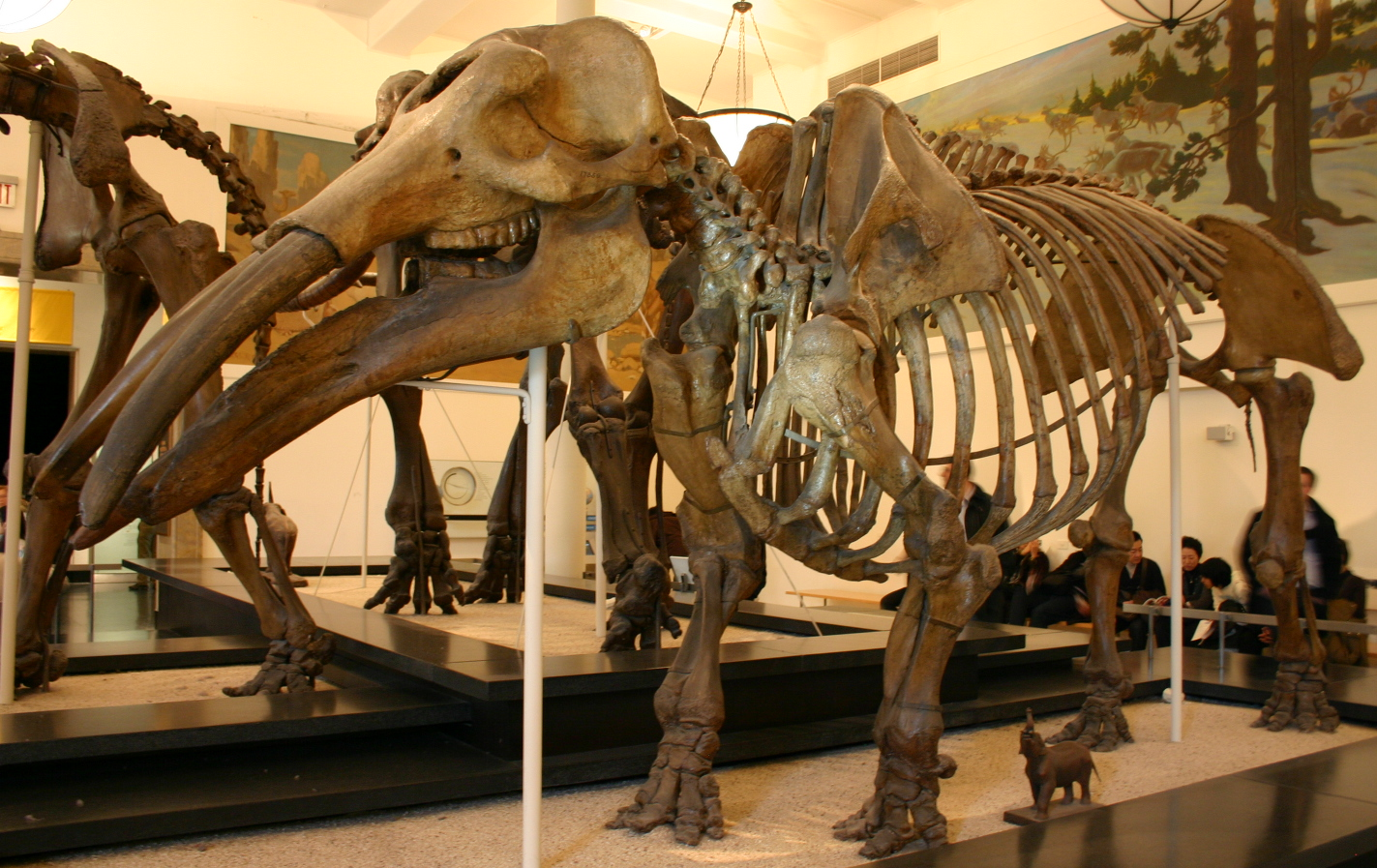
- Mounted fossilized skeleton of the Miocene-Pleistocene elephant relative Gomphotherium
  †Gomphotherium
  - †Gomphotherium obscurum
- Gopherus
  - †Gopherus agassizii
- †Gymnocladus
  - †Gymnocladus dayana

== H ==
- †Helaletes
  - †Helaletes nanus
- Heloderma
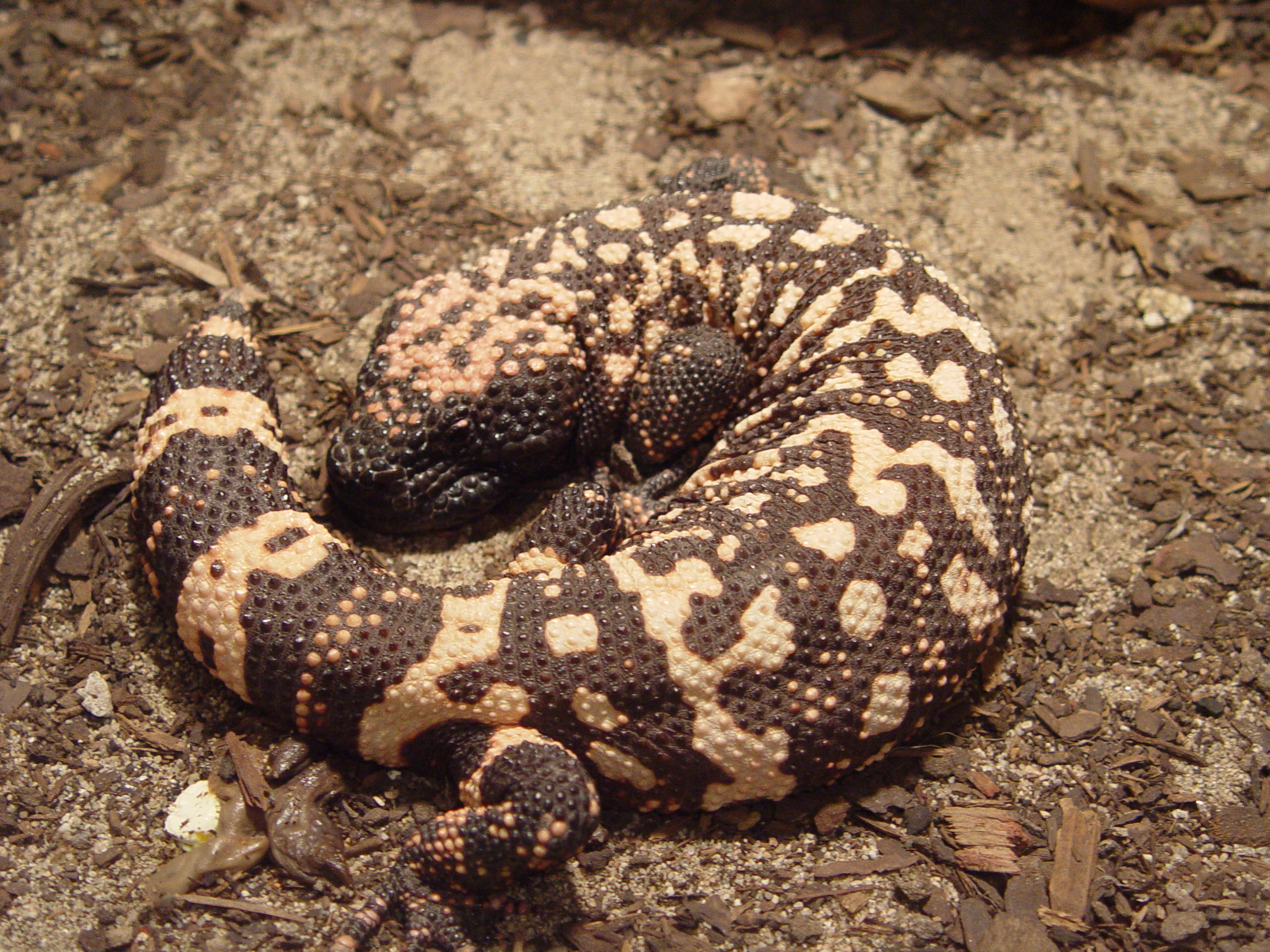
  - Gila monster
    †Heloderma suspectum
- †Hemiauchenia
  - †Hemiauchenia macrocephala – or unidentified comparable form
- †Hesperhys
  - †Hesperhys vagrans – or unidentified related form
- †Hesperocamelus
  - †Hesperocamelus stylodon – type locality for species
- †Hesperogaulus
- †Hesperolagomys
  - †Hesperolagomys galbreathi – type locality for species
- †Heteromeles
  - †Heteromeles desatoyana
  - †Heteromeles sonomensis
  - †Heteromeles stenophylla – type locality for species
- †Hexobelomeryx
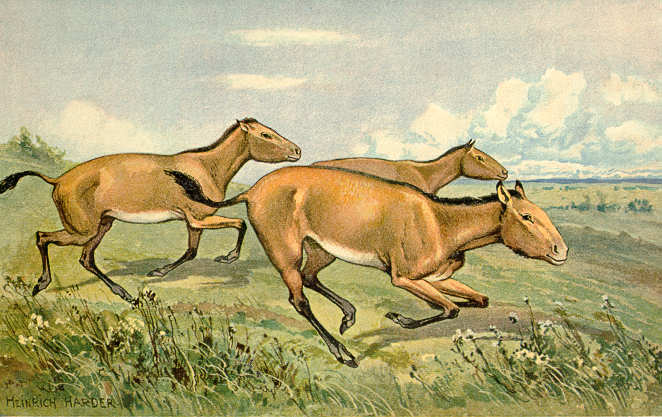
- Life restoration of a herd of the Miocene-Pleistocene horse Hipparion. Heinrich Harder (1920).
  †Hipparion
  - †Hipparion tehonense
- †Hippotherium
- †Holodiscus
  - †Holodiscus idahoensis
- Hydrangea
  - †Hydrangea bendirei
  - †Hydrangea ovatifolius
- †Hyopsodus
  - †Hyopsodus paulus
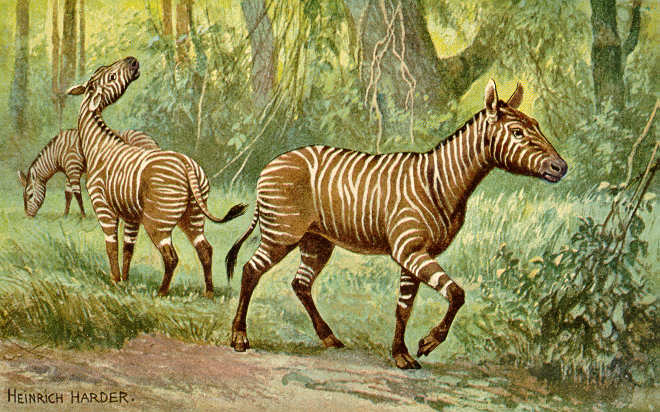
- Life restoration of the Miocene horse Hypohippus. Heinrich Harder (1920).
  †Hypohippus
  - †Hypohippus affinis
  - †Hypohippus nevadensis – type locality for species
  - †Hypohippus osborni – or unidentified comparable form
- †Hypolagus
  - †Hypolagus edensis
  - †Hypolagus fontinalis
  - †Hypolagus furlongi
  - †Hypolagus gidleyi
  - †Hypolagus parviplicatus – type locality for species
  - †Hypolagus ringoldensis
  - †Hypolagus tedfordi
  - †Hypolagus vetus – type locality for species
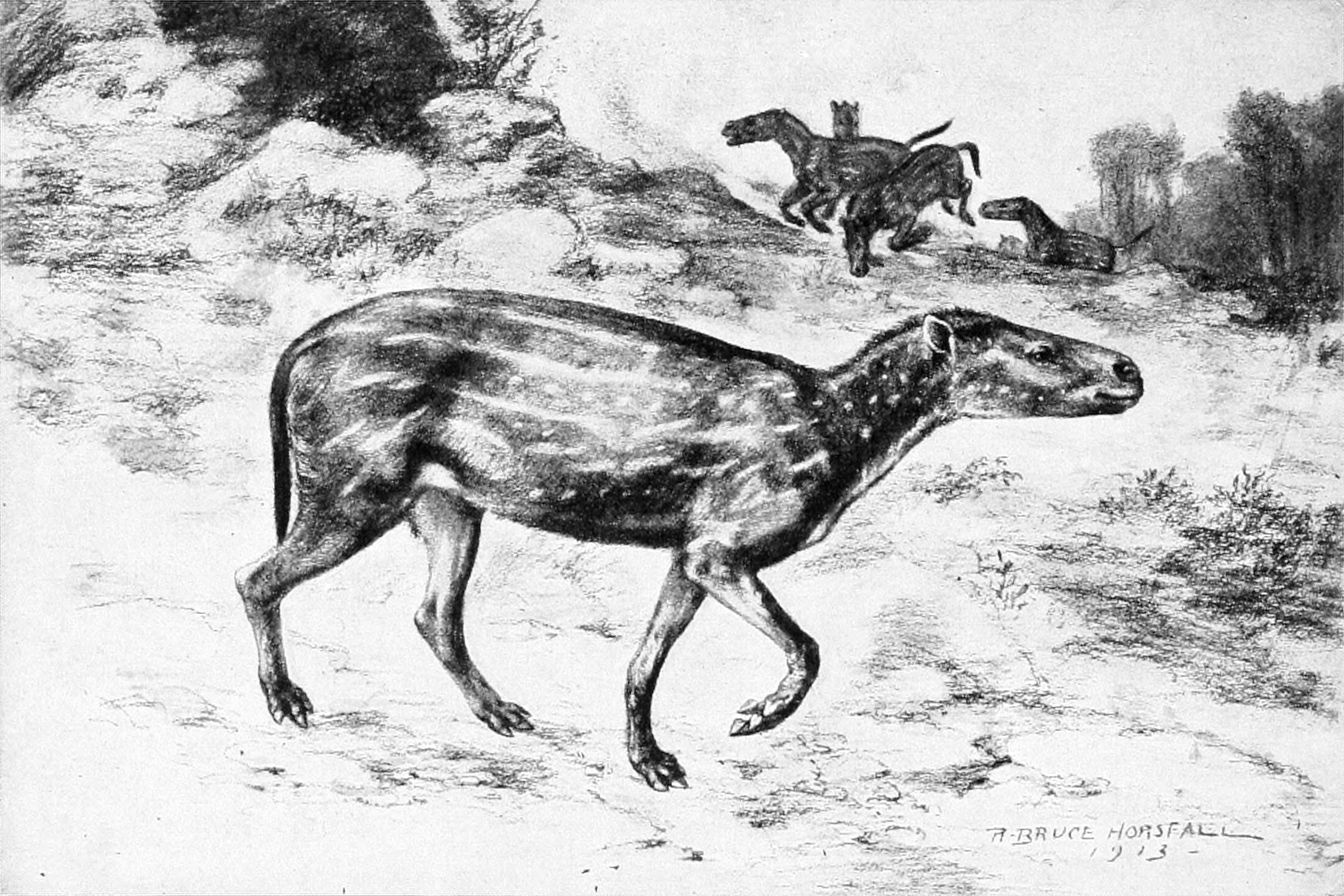
- Life restoration of the Eocene odd-toed ungulate Hyrachyus
  †Hyrachyus
  - †Hyrachyus modestus
- †Hystricops – tentative report

== I ==
- †Ilingoceros
  - †Ilingoceros alexandrae – type locality for species
  - †Ilingoceros schizoceras – type locality for species
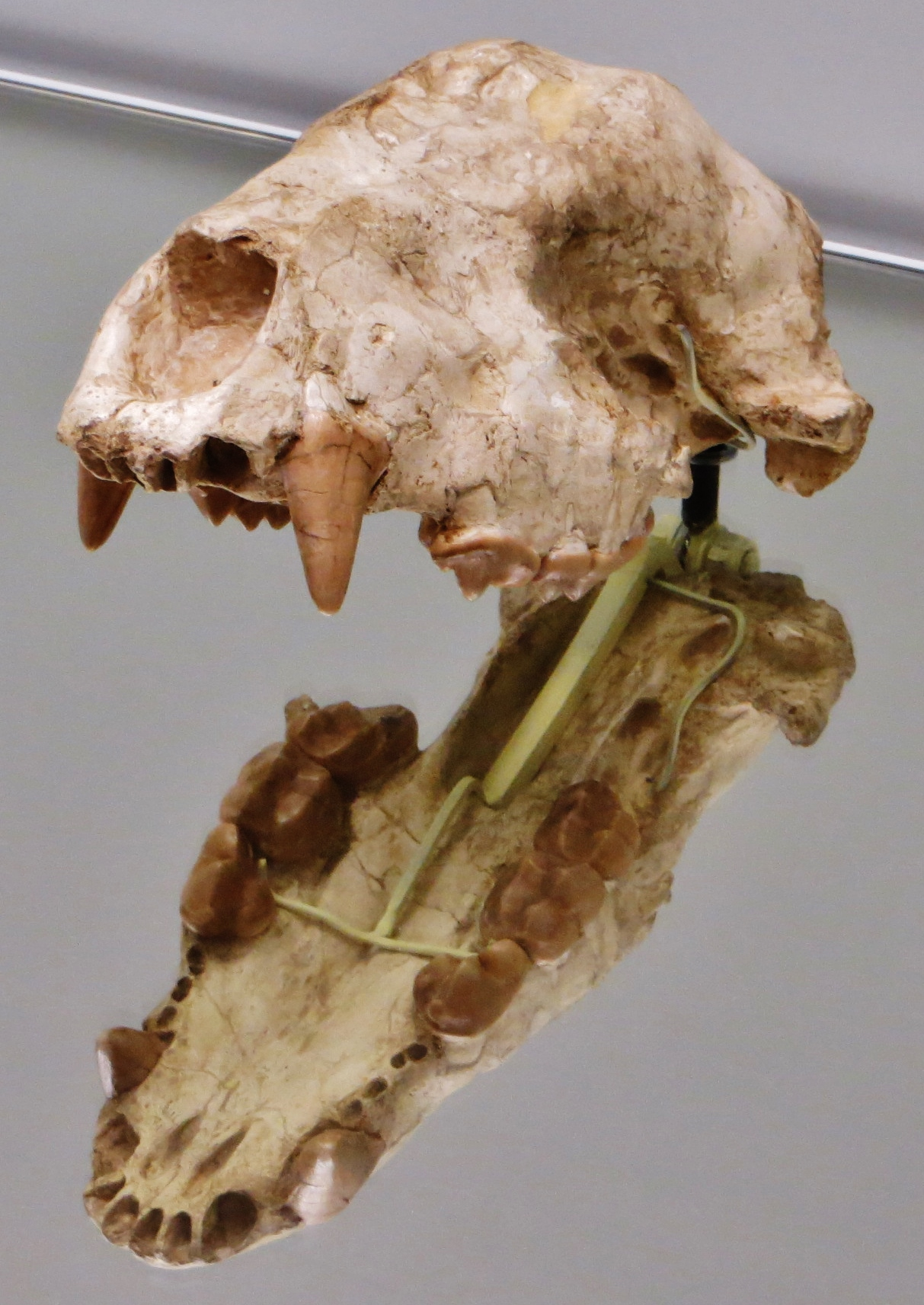
- Fossilized skull of the Miocene bear Indarctos
  †Indarctos
  - †Indarctos nevadensis
- †Ischyrocyon
- †Isectolophus
  - †Isectolophus latidens

== J ==
- Juglans
  - †Juglans desatoyana
  - †Juglans nevadensis
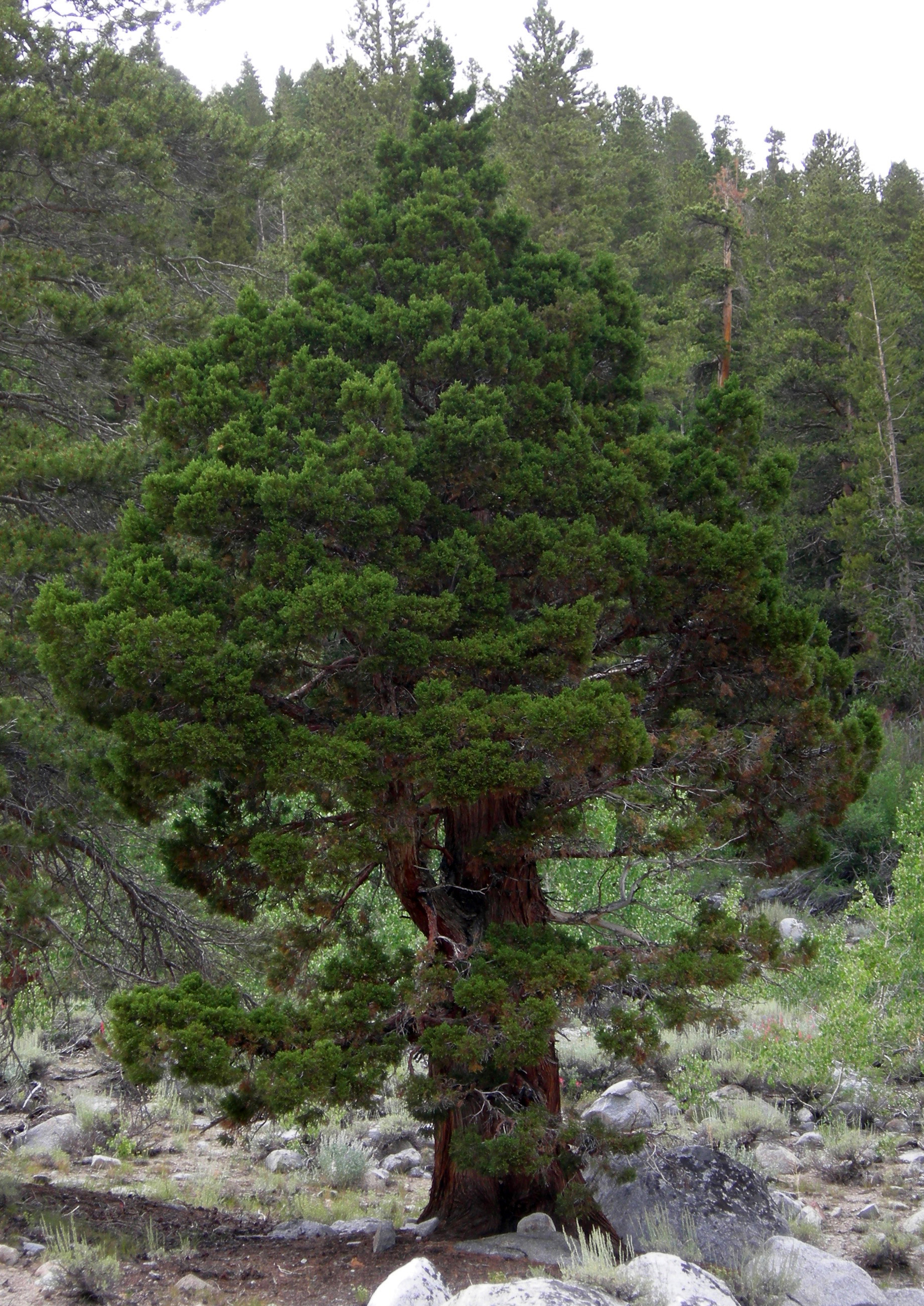
- A living Juniperus, or juniper tree
  Juniperus
  - †Juniperus desatoyana
  - †Juniperus nevadensis

== K ==
- †Knightomys

== L ==
- †Lachnarius – type locality for genus
  - †Lachnarius miocaenicus – type locality for species
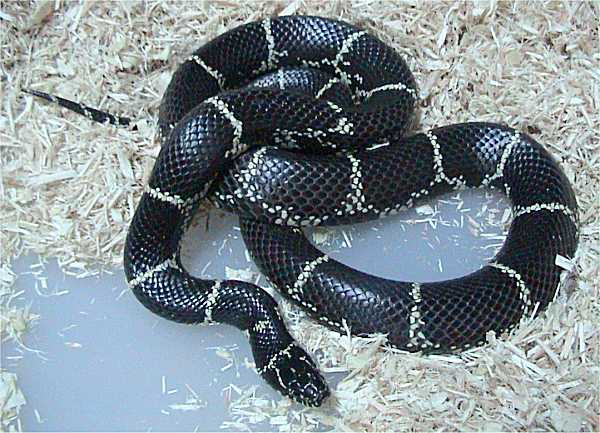
- A living Lampropeltis getula, or eastern kingsnake
  Lampropeltis
  - †Lampropeltis getulus
- Larix
  - †Larix cassiana
  - †Larix churchillensis
  - †Larix fernleyii – type locality for species
  - †Larix nevadensis
- Lemmiscus
  - †Lemmiscus curtatus
- †Lepoides
  - †Lepoides lepoides
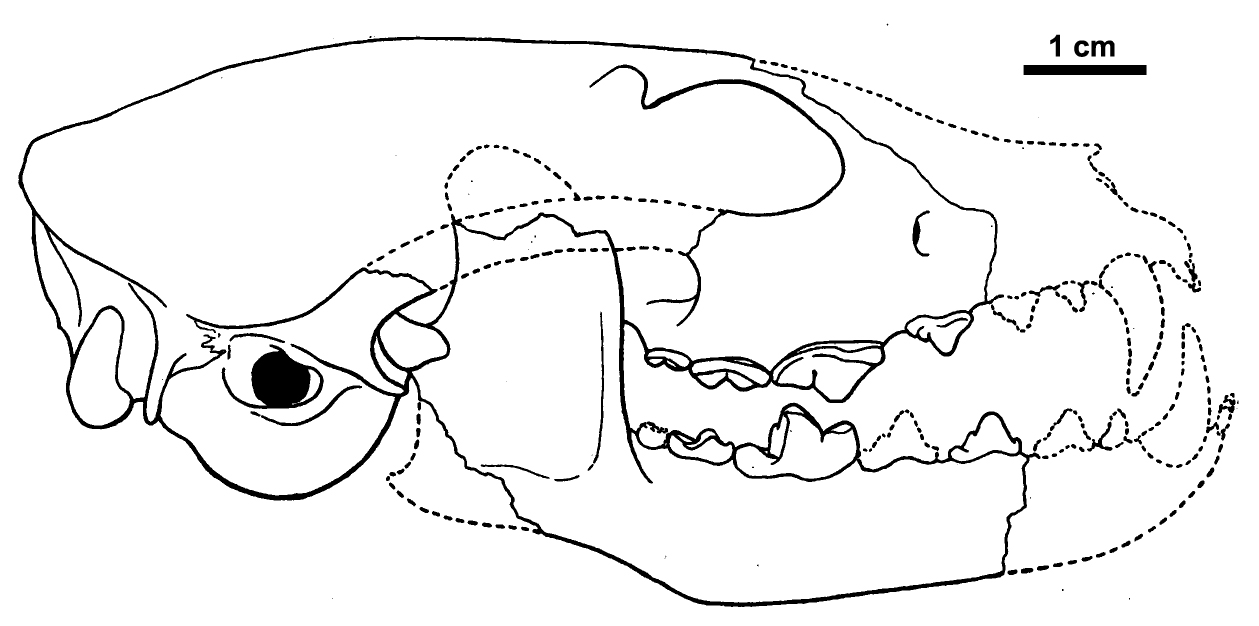
- Illustration of a fossilized skull of the Oligocene-Miocene dog Leptocyon
  †Leptocyon
  - †Leptocyon leidyi
  - †Leptocyon matthewi
  - †Leptocyon vafer
- †Leucothoe
  - †Leucothoe nevadensis
- †Limnoecus
  - †Limnoecus compressus
  - †Limnoecus tricuspis
- Limnonyx
- †Liodontia
  - †Liodontia alexandrae – type locality for species
  - †Liodontia furlongi
- †Lithocarpus
  - †Lithocarpus nevadensis
- †Lutravus
  - †Lutravus halli – type locality for species
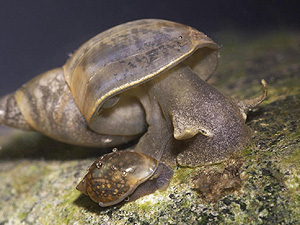
- A living Lymnaea (larger) freshwater snail, or Melantho snail
  Lymnaea
- †Lyonothamnus
  - †Lyonothamnus cedrusensis
  - †Lyonothamnus parvifolius

== M ==
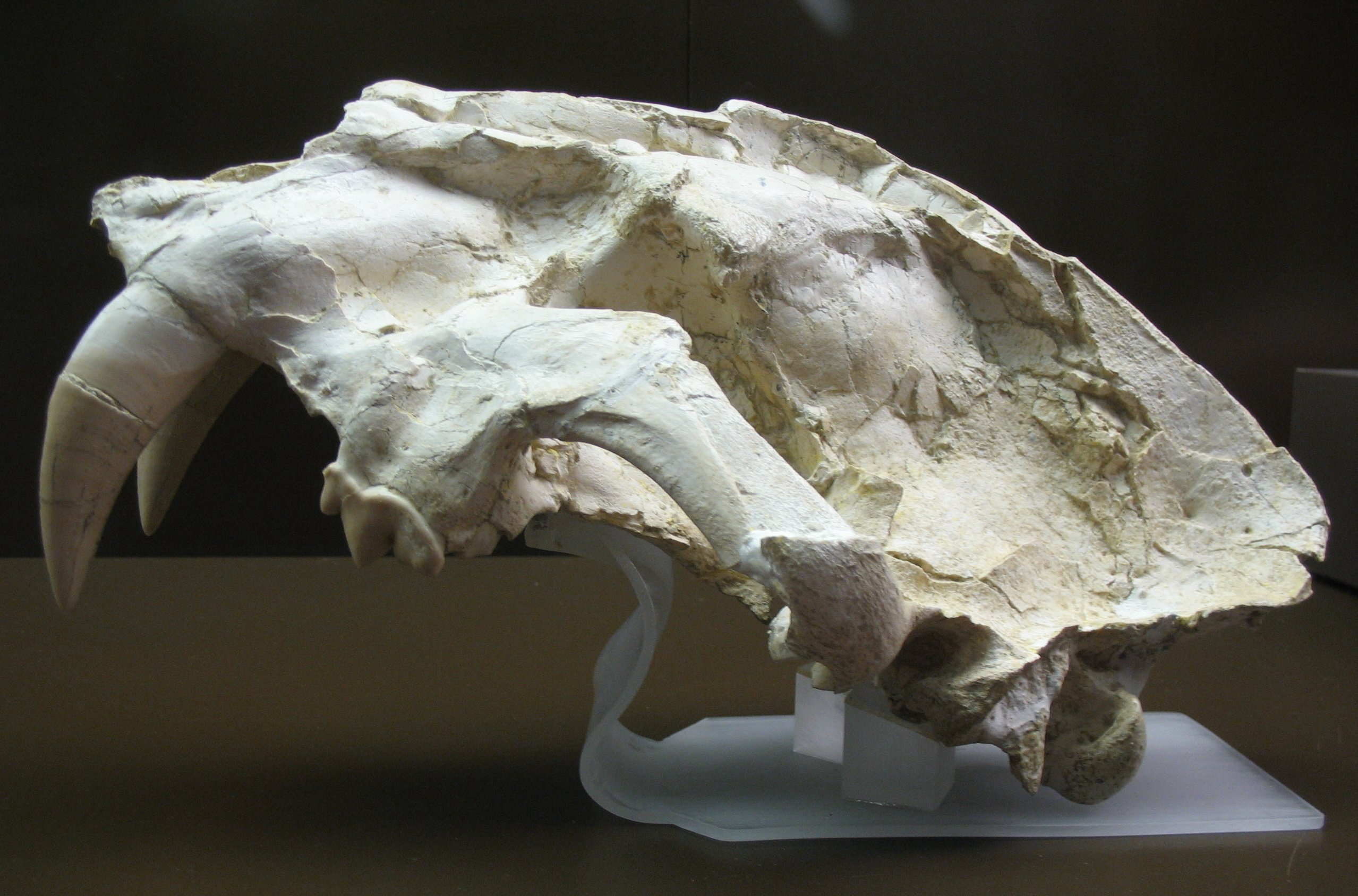
- Fossilized cranium of the Miocene-Pleistocene saber-toothed cat Machairodus
  †Machairodus
- †Macrognathomys
  - †Macrognathomys nanus – type locality for species
- Mahonia
  - †Mahonia macginitiei
  - †Mahonia marginata
  - †Mahonia reticulata
  - †Mahonia reticulate
  - †Mahonia simplex
  - †Mahonia trainii
- †Mammut
  - †Mammut americanum
  - †Mammut matthewi
- Marmota
  - †Marmota korthi – type locality for species
  - †Marmota minor
- †Marshochoerus
  - †Marshochoerus socialis
- †Martinogale – tentative report
- Masticophis
  - †Masticophis flagellum
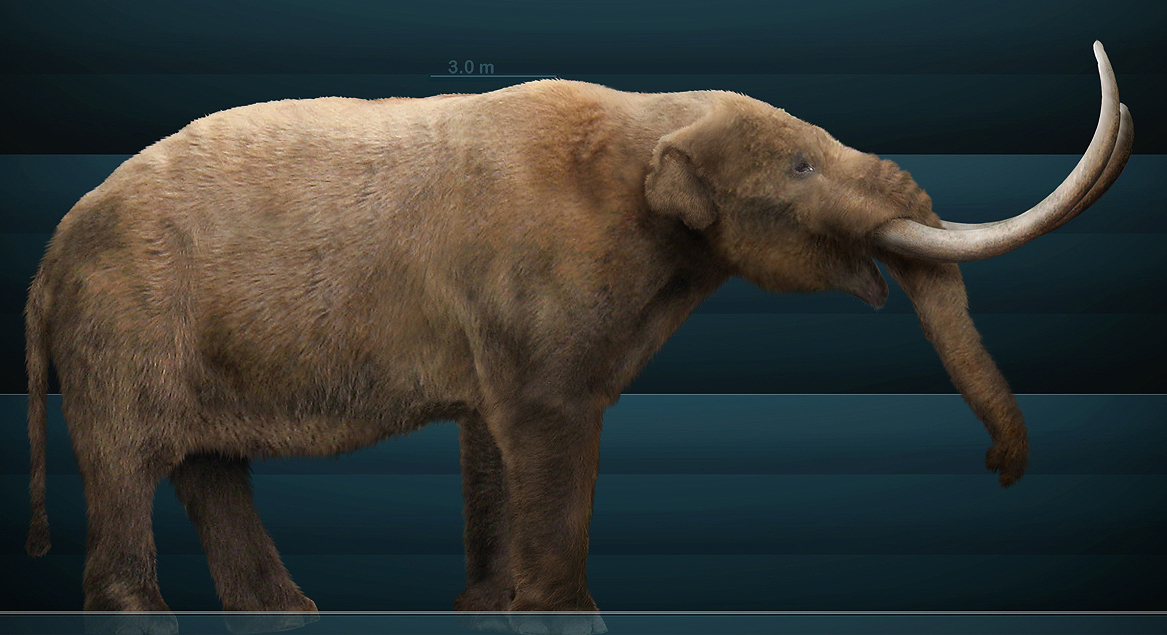
- Restoration of a Mammut americanum, or American mastodon
  †Mastodon
  - †Mastodon proavus
- †Mattimys
- †Megahippus
  - †Megahippus matthewi – or unidentified comparable form
  - †Megahippus mckennai
- †Megalonyx
  - †Megalonyx leptostomus
- †Megapeomys
  - †Megapeomys bobwilsoni – type locality for species
- †Megatylopus
- †Meniscomys
  - †Meniscomys hippodus
- †Merychippus
  - †Merychippus brevidontus
  - †Merychippus calamarius
  - †Merychippus californicus
  - †Merychippus close
- †Merychyus
  - †Merychyus elegans
  - †Merychyus novomexicanus
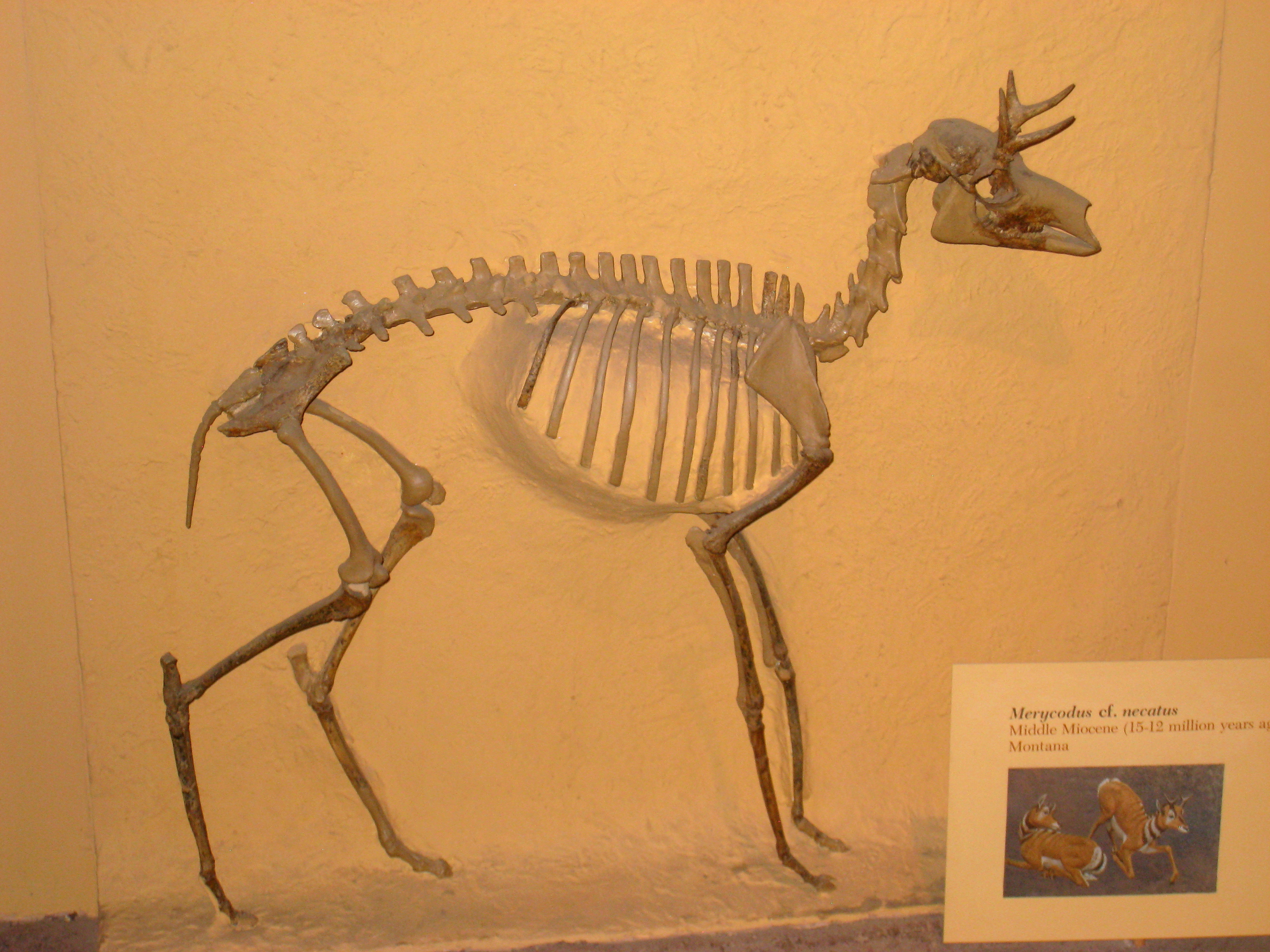
- Mounted fossilized skeleton of the Miocene pronghorn Merycodus
  †Merycodus
  - †Merycodus hookwayi – type locality for species
- †Metalopex
  - †Metalopex merriami
- †Metatomarctus
- †Metechinus
  - †Metechinus nevadensis – type locality for species
- †Microparamys
  - †Microparamys sambucus
- †Microtomarctus
  - †Microtomarctus conferta
- Microtus
  - †Microtus meadensis
  - †Microtus paroperarius
  - †Microtus pennsylvanicus
- Mictomys
  - †Mictomys meltoni
- †Mimomys
  - †Mimomys panacaensis – type locality for species
  - †Mimomys virginianus
- †Mioedipoda – type locality for genus
  - †Mioedipoda reisereri – type locality for species
- †Miopelodytes – type locality for genus
  - †Miopelodytes gilmorei – type locality for species
- †Miospermophilus
  - †Miospermophilus wyomingensis
- †Monosaulax
  - †Monosaulax curtus
  - †Monosaulax skinneri
- †Moropus
  - †Moropus merriami
- Mustela
  - †Mustela americana
  - †Mustela nigripes
  - †Mustela nivalis
- Myotis
- †Mystipterus
  - †Mystipterus vespertilio – type locality for species

== N ==
- †Negodiaetictis – type locality for genus
  - †Negodiaetictis rugatrulleum – type locality for species
- †Nekrolagus
  - †Nekrolagus progressus
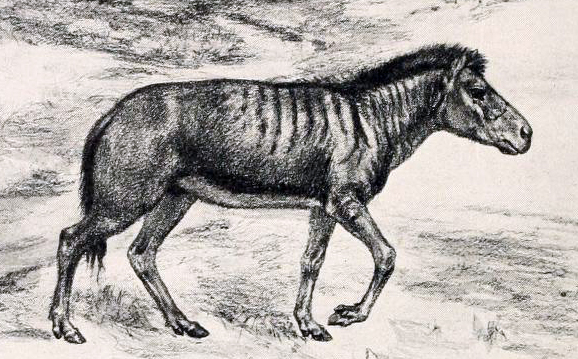
- Life restoration of a herd of Neohipparion. Robert Bruce Horsfall (1913).
  †Neohipparion
  - †Neohipparion leptode – type locality for species
- Neotoma
  - †Neotoma vaughani – or unidentified comparable form
- †Neotragocerus – tentative report
- †Nerterogeomys – tentative report
- †Nevaphis – type locality for genus
  - †Nevaphis nevadensis – type locality for species
- †Notharctus
  - †Notharctus tenebrosus
- Notiosorex
- †Nymphaeites
  - †Nymphaeites nevadensis

== O ==
- Odocoileus
- Ondatra
  - †Ondatra idahoensis – tentative report
- †Ophiomys
  - †Ophiomys magilli
- Oreamnos
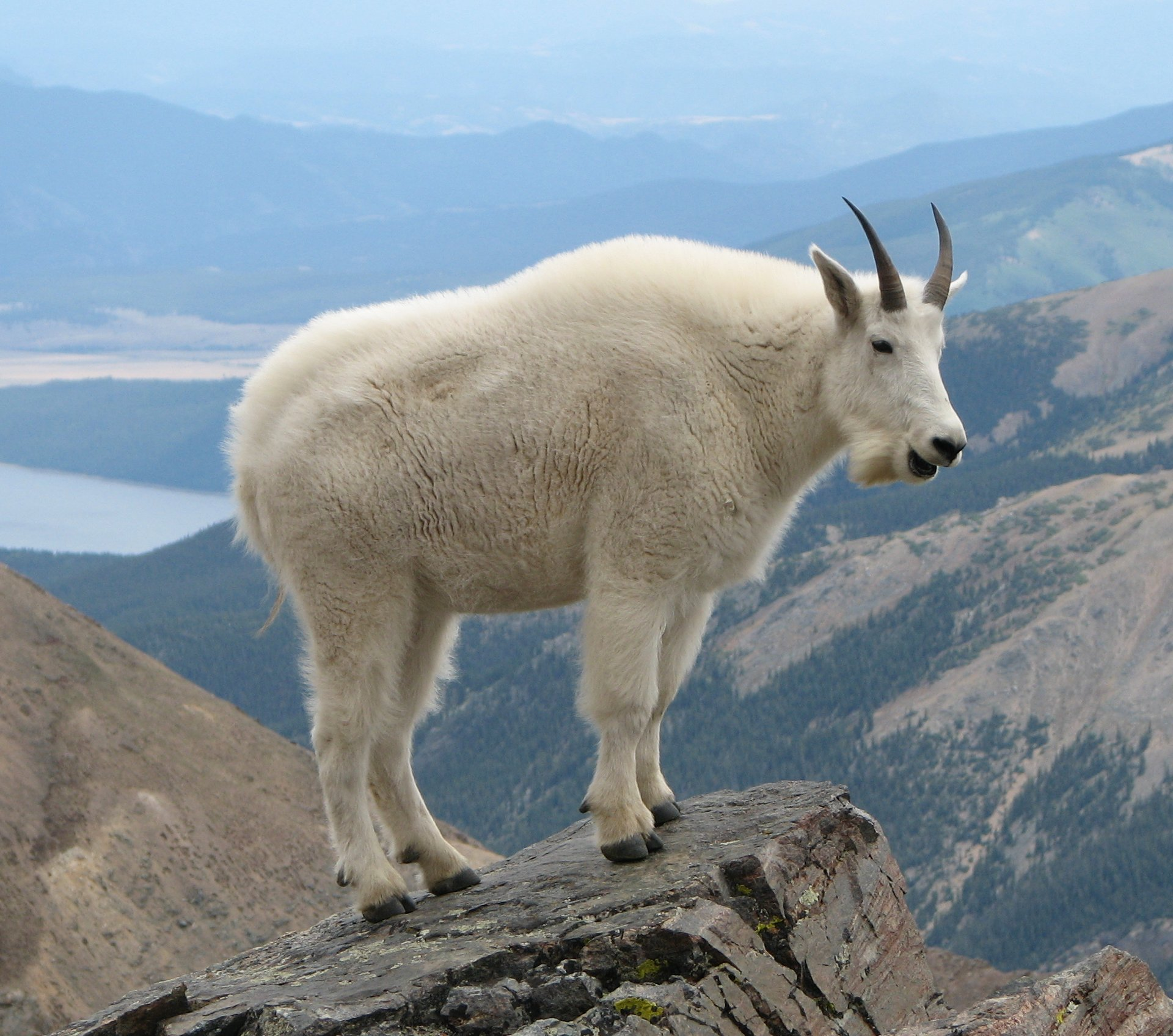
  - A living Oreamnos americanus, or mountain goat
    †Oreamnos americanus
- †Oregonomys
  - †Oregonomys sargenti – or unidentified comparable form
- †Oreolagus
  - †Oreolagus nevadensis – type locality for species
- Ostrya
  - †Ostrya oregoniana
- Ovis
  - †Ovis canadensis

== P ==
- †Pachystima
  - †Pachystima nevadensis
- †Paciculus – or unidentified comparable form
- †Paenemarmota
  - †Paenemarmota nevadensis
- †Palaeogreenidea – type locality for genus
  - †Palaeogreenidea rittae – type locality for species
- †Pantolestes
  - †Pantolestes longieundus
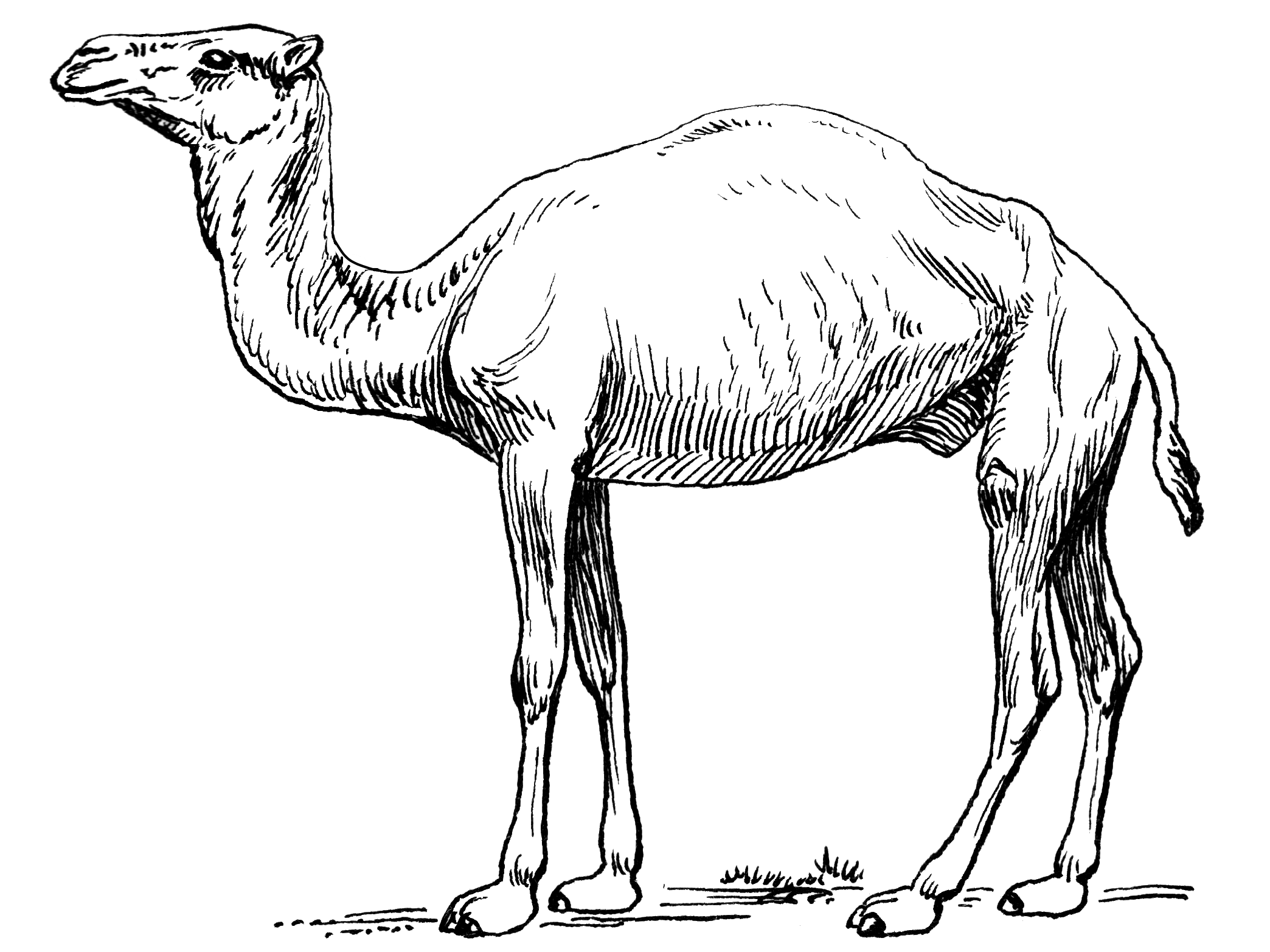
- Paracamelus
  †Paracamelus
- †Paracosoryx
  - †Paracosoryx alticornis – or unidentified comparable form
  - †Paracosoryx loxoceros
  - †Paracosoryx nevadensis
  - †Paracosoryx wilsoni – or unidentified related form
- †Paracynarctus
  - †Paracynarctus kelloggi
- †Parahippus
  - †Parahippus pawniensis
- †Parapliohippus
  - †Parapliohippus carrizoensis – or unidentified comparable form
- †Parapliosaccomys
  - †Parapliosaccomys oregonensis
- †Paratomarctus
  - †Paratomarctus temerarius
- †Paronychomys
  - †Paronychomys lemredfieldi – or unidentified comparable form
- †Pauromys
  - †Pauromys exallos
- †Peraceras
  - †Peraceras profectum
  - †Peraceras superciliosum
- †Perognathoides
  - †Perognathoides quartus
- Perognathus
  - †Perognathus minutus – or unidentified comparable form
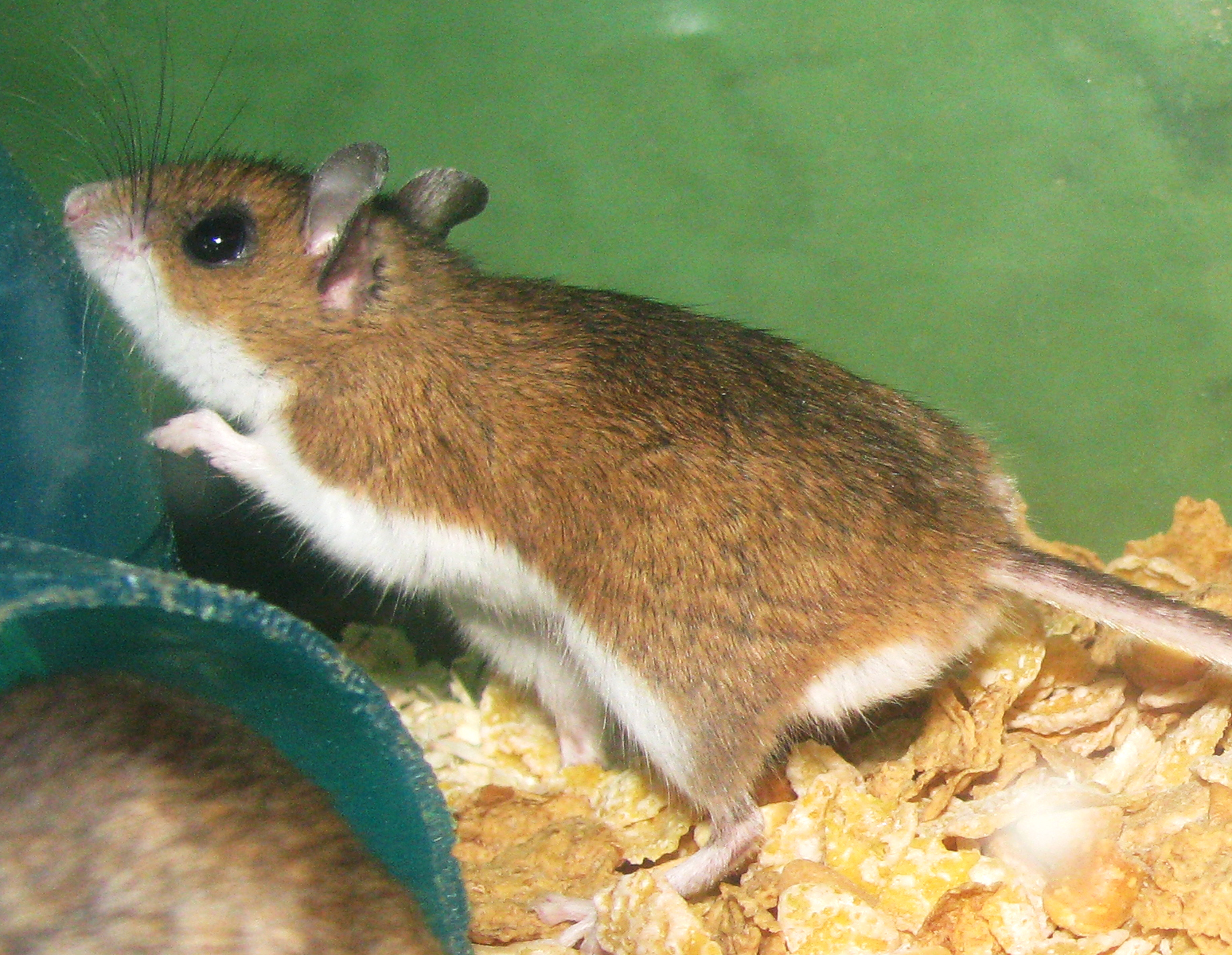
- A living Peromyscus, or deer mouse
  Peromyscus
  - †Peromyscus antiquus – type locality for species
  - †Peromyscus dentalis
- †Pewelagus
  - †Pewelagus dawsonae
- Phenacomys
  - †Phenacomys gryci – or unidentified comparable form
- Phrynosoma
  - †Phrynosoma platyrhinos
- Picea
  - †Picea lahontense
  - †Picea magna
  - †Picea sonomensis
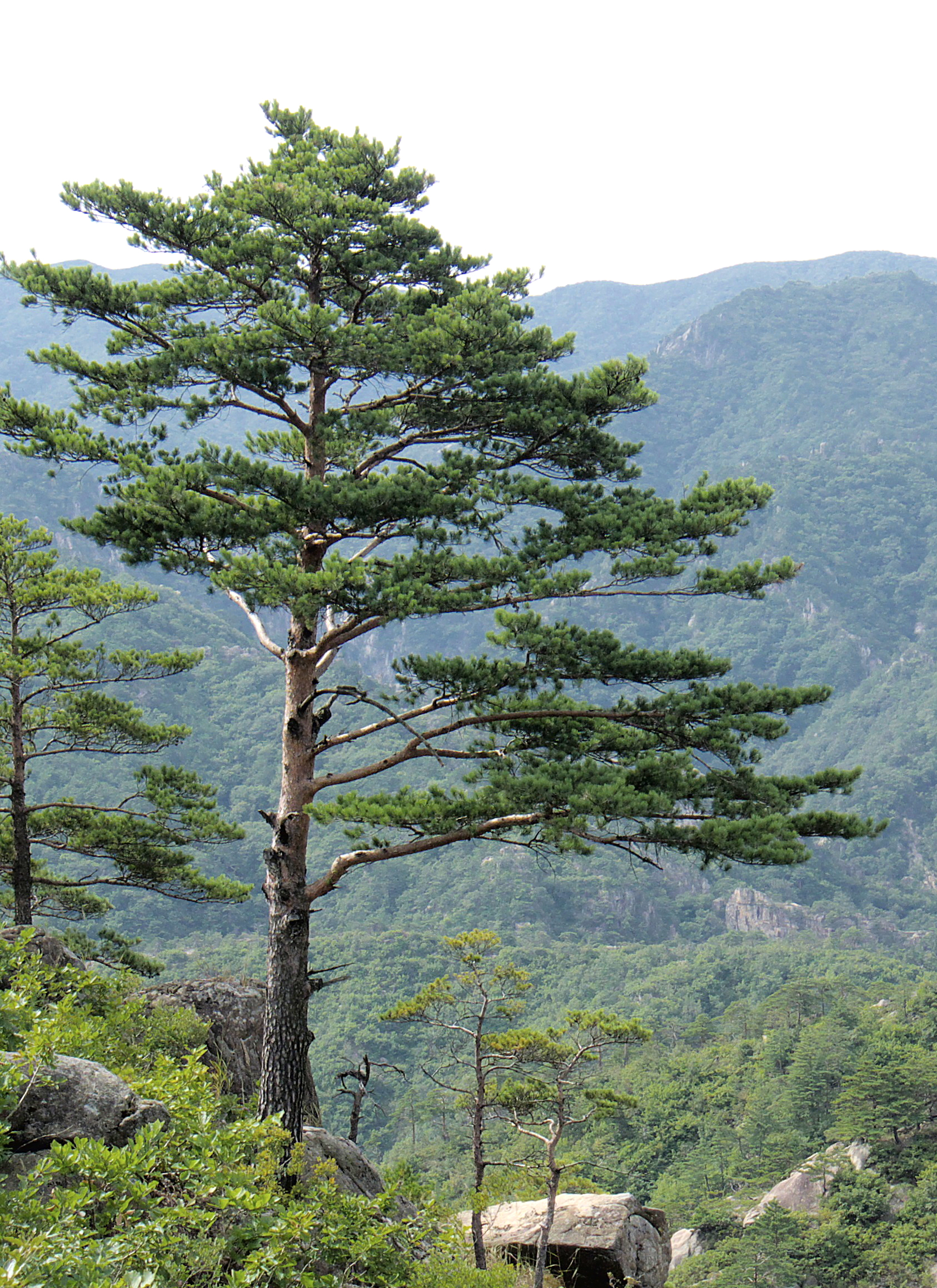
- A living Pinus, or pine tree
  Pinus
  - †Pinus alvordensis
  - †Pinus balfouroides
  - †Pinus florissanti
  - †Pinus ponderosoides
  - †Pinus prelambertiana
  - †Pinus quinifolia
  - †Pinus sturgisii
  - †Pinus tiptoniana
  - †Pinus wheeleri
- Pituophis
  - †Pituophis catenifer
- Platanus
  - †Platanus bendirei
  - †Platanus dissecta
  - †Platanus paucidentata
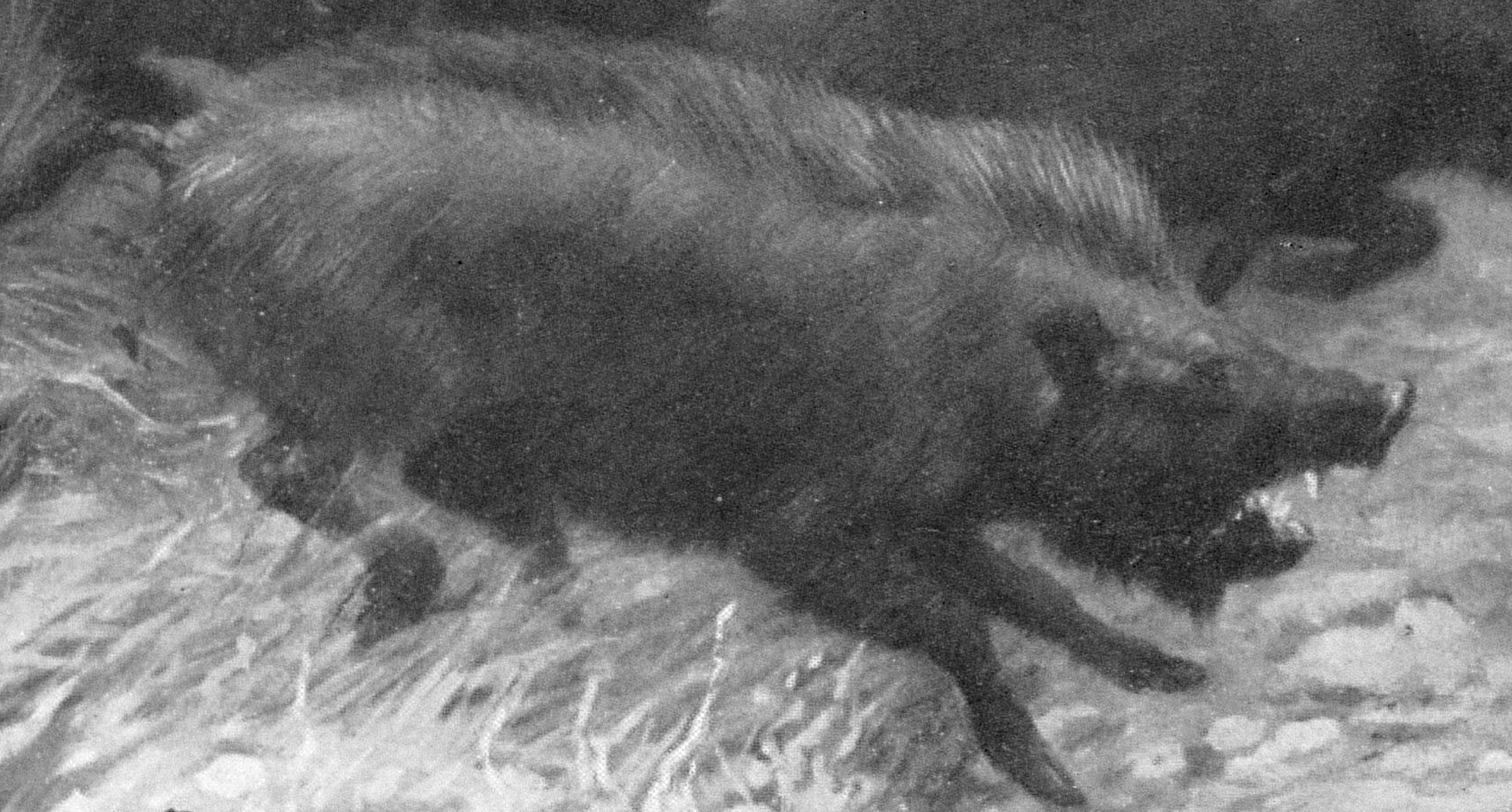
- Restoration of a herd of alarmed Miocene-Pleistocene peccaries of the genus Platygonus. Charles R. Knight (1922).
  †Platygonus
  - †Platygonus pearcei – or unidentified comparable form
- †Pleiolama
  - †Pleiolama vera
- †Plesiosorex
  - †Plesiosorex latidens
- †Pliauchenia
- †Pliogale
  - †Pliogale furlongi – type locality for species
- †Pliohippus
  - †Pliohippus fairbanksi – or unidentified comparable form
  - †Pliohippus spectans
- †Pliosaccomys
  - †Pliosaccomys dubius – type locality for species
- †Pliotaxidea
  - †Pliotaxidea nevadensis
- †Pliozapus
  - †Pliozapus solus – type locality for species
- †Pontoniella – tentative report
- †Populas
  - †Populas eotremuloides
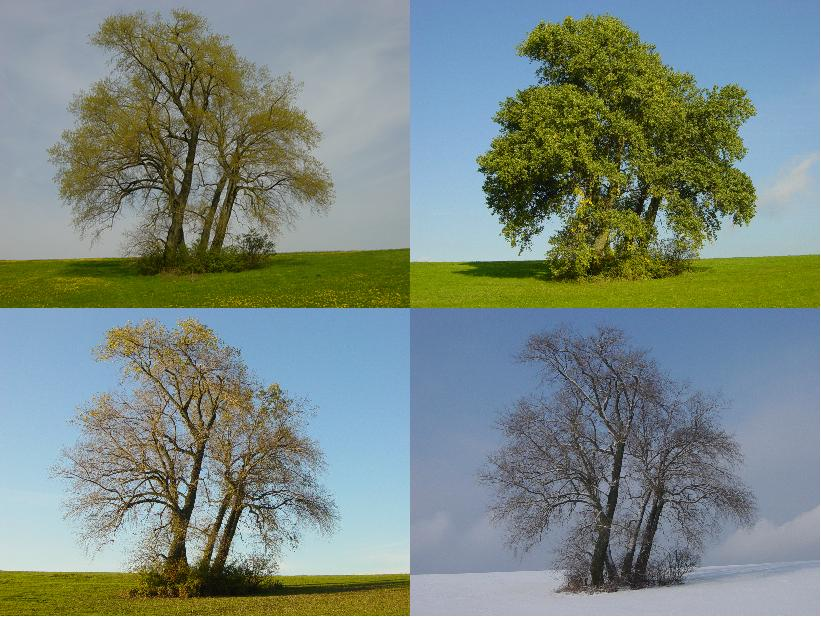
- Montage of photographs in spring (top left), summer (top right), autumn (bottom left), and winter (bottom right) of Populus, or poplar tree
  Populus
  - †Populus alexanderi
  - †Populus bonhamii
  - †Populus cedrusensis
  - †Populus eotremuloidea
  - †Populus eotremuloides
  - †Populus payettensis
  - †Populus pliotremuloides
  - †Populus sonorensis
  - †Populus subwashoensis – type locality for species
  - †Populus washoensis
- †Problastomeryx
  - †Problastomeryx primus
- †Procamelus
  - †Procamelus grandis – or unidentified comparable form
- †Prodipodomys
- †Prodipoides
  - †Prodipoides dividerus – type locality for species
  - †Prodipoides lecontei
- †Pronotolagus
  - †Pronotolagus nevadensis – type locality for species
- †Prosthennops
  - †Prosthennops niobrarensis – or unidentified comparable form
- †Protolabis
  - †Protolabis coartatus
  - †Protolabis heterodontus
- †Protomarctus
  - †Protomarctus optatus
- †Protomelanitta
  - †Protomelanitta bakeri – type locality for species
- †Protospermophilus
  - †Protospermophilus angusticeps
- Prunus
  - †Prunus chaneyi
  - †Prunus chaneyii
  - †Prunus moragensis
  - †Prunus treasheri
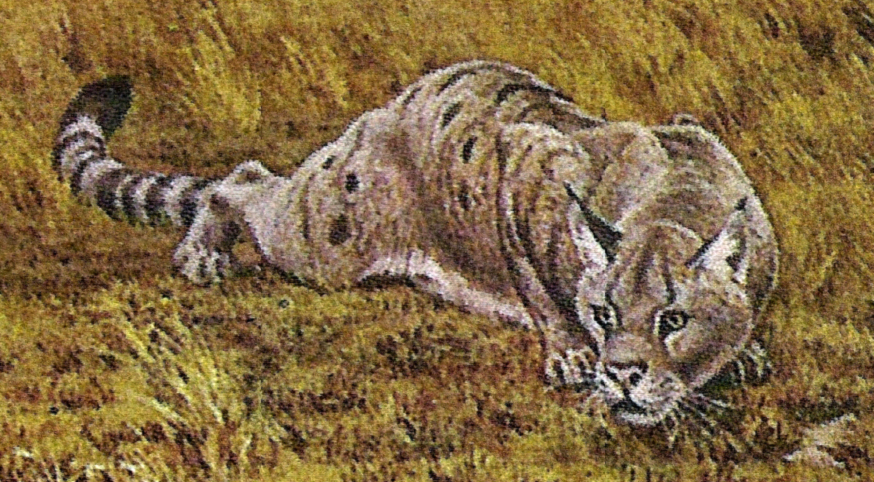
- Restoration of the Miocene cat Pseudaelurus
  †Pseudaelurus
  - †Pseudaelurus intrepidus
- †Pseudocamponotus – type locality for genus
  - †Pseudocamponotus elkoanus – type locality for species
- †Pseudotrimylus
- †Pseudotsuga
  - †Pseudotsuga sonomensis
- Pteridium
  - †Pteridium scalabazensis
- Pterocarya
  - †Pterocarya mixta

== Q ==
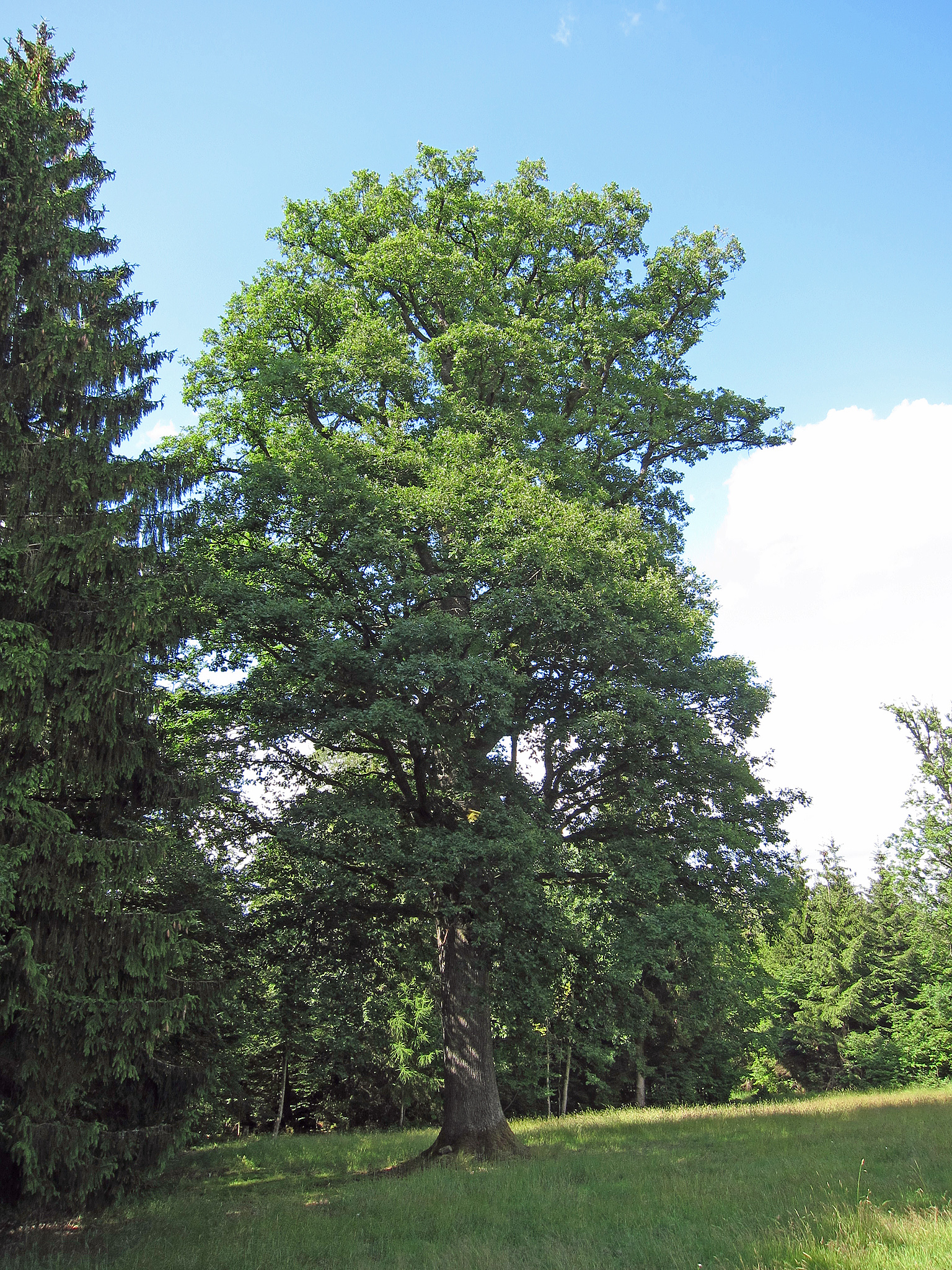
- A living Quercus, or oak tree
  Quercus
  - †Quercus hannibali
  - †Quercus hannibalii
  - †Quercus pollardiana
  - †Quercus prelobata
  - †Quercus renoana
  - †Quercus shrevoides
  - †Quercus simulata
  - †Quercus wislizenoides

== R ==
- †Rana
  - †Rana johnsoni – type locality for species
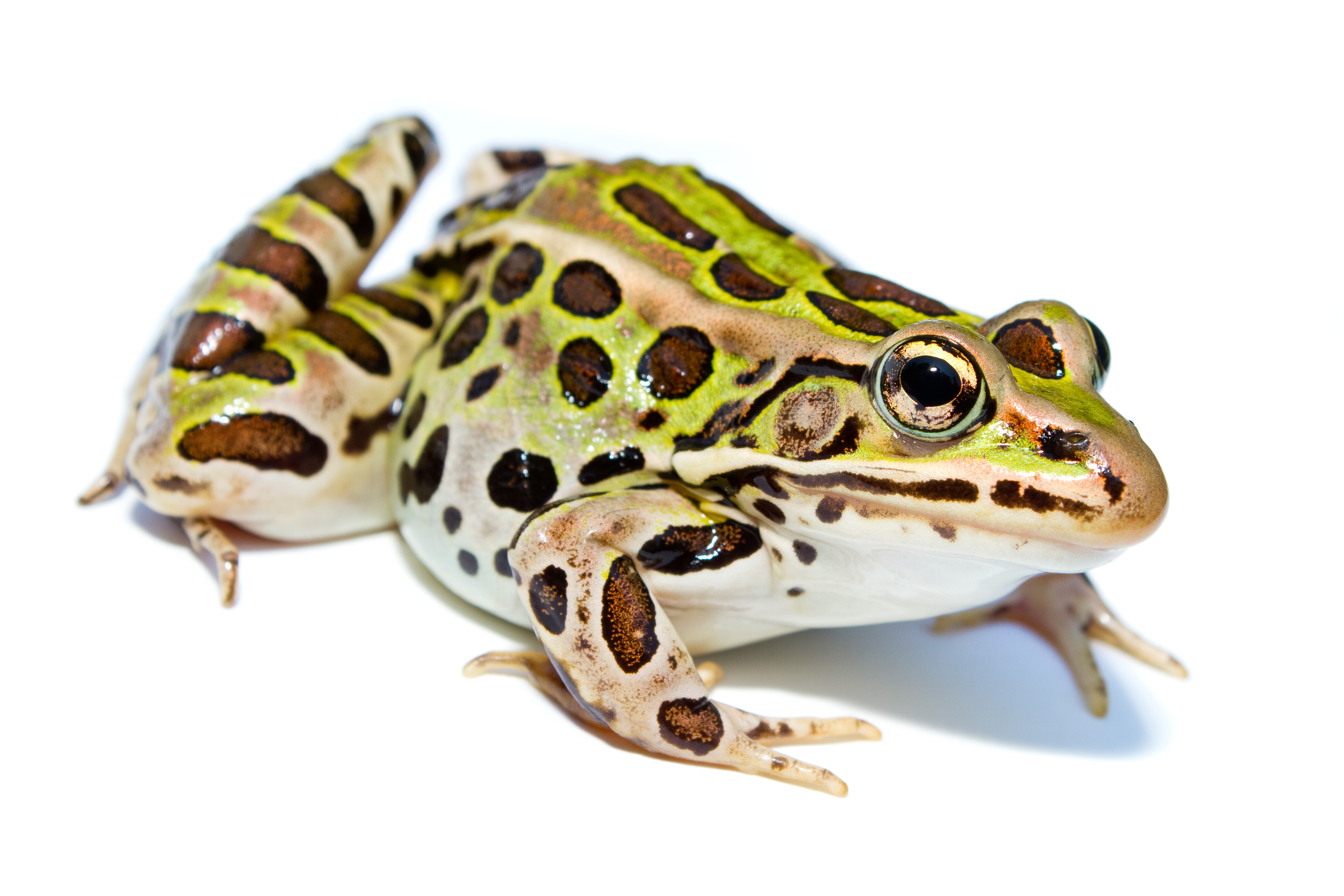
  - A living Lithobates pipiens (sometimes Rana pipiens), or northern leopard frog
    †Rana pipiens
- †Reithroparamys
  - †Reithroparamys delicatissimus
  - †Reithroparamys huerfanensis – or unidentified comparable form
- †Repomys
  - †Repomys gustelyi – or unidentified comparable form
  - †Repomys panacaensis
- †Rhamnus
  - †Rhamnus columbiana
  - †Rhamnus precalifornica
- Rhododendron
  - †Rhododendron gianellana
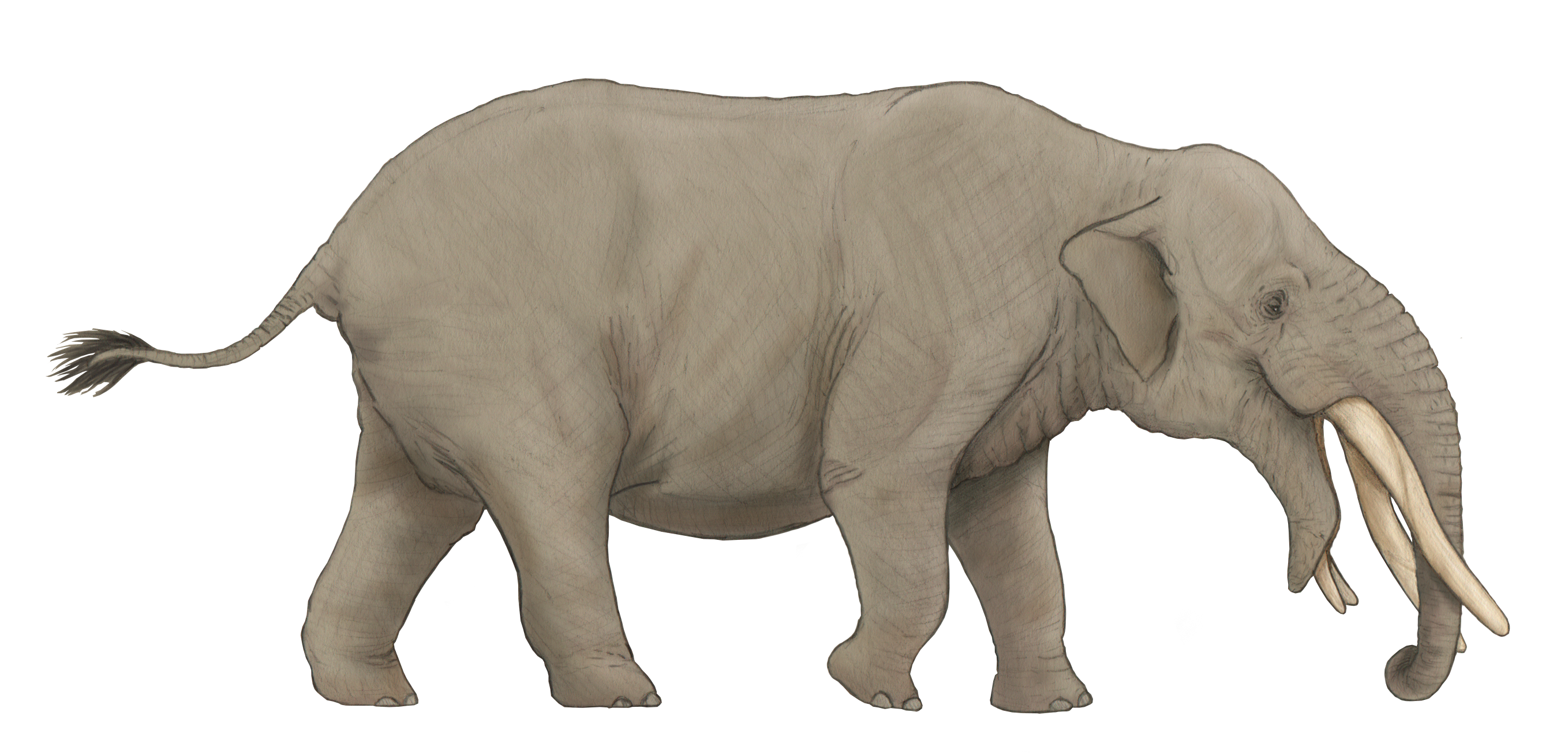
- Restoration of the Miocene-Pliocene elephant relative Rhynchotherium
  †Rhynchotherium
- Rhyncolus
  - †Rhyncolus kathrynae – type locality for species
- †Ribes
  - †Ribes barrowsii
  - †Ribes bonhamii
  - †Ribes galeana
  - †Ribes stanfordianum
  - †Ribes webbi
- †Robinia
  - †Robinia bisonensis
  - †Robinia californica
- Rosa
  - †Rosa harneyana
  - †Rosa schornii

== S ==
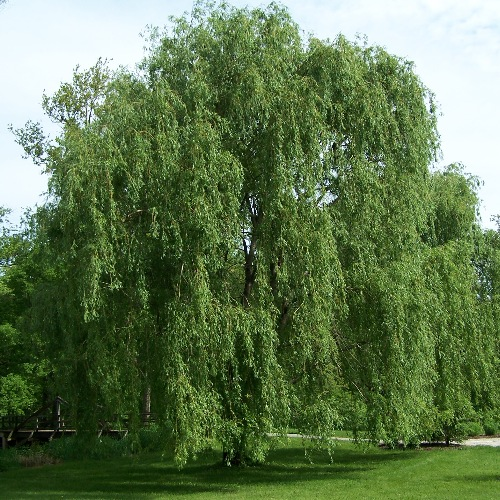
- A living Salix, or willow
  Salix
  - †Salix boisiensis
  - †Salix churchillensis
  - †Salix desatoyana
  - †Salix inquirenda
  - †Salix knowltoni
  - †Salix laevigatoides
  - †Salix owyheeana
  - †Salix payettensis
  - †Salix pelviga
  - †Salix storeyana
  - †Salix truckeana
  - †Salix venosiuscula
  - †Salix wildcatensis
- †Satherium
  - †Satherium piscinarium
- Sauromalus
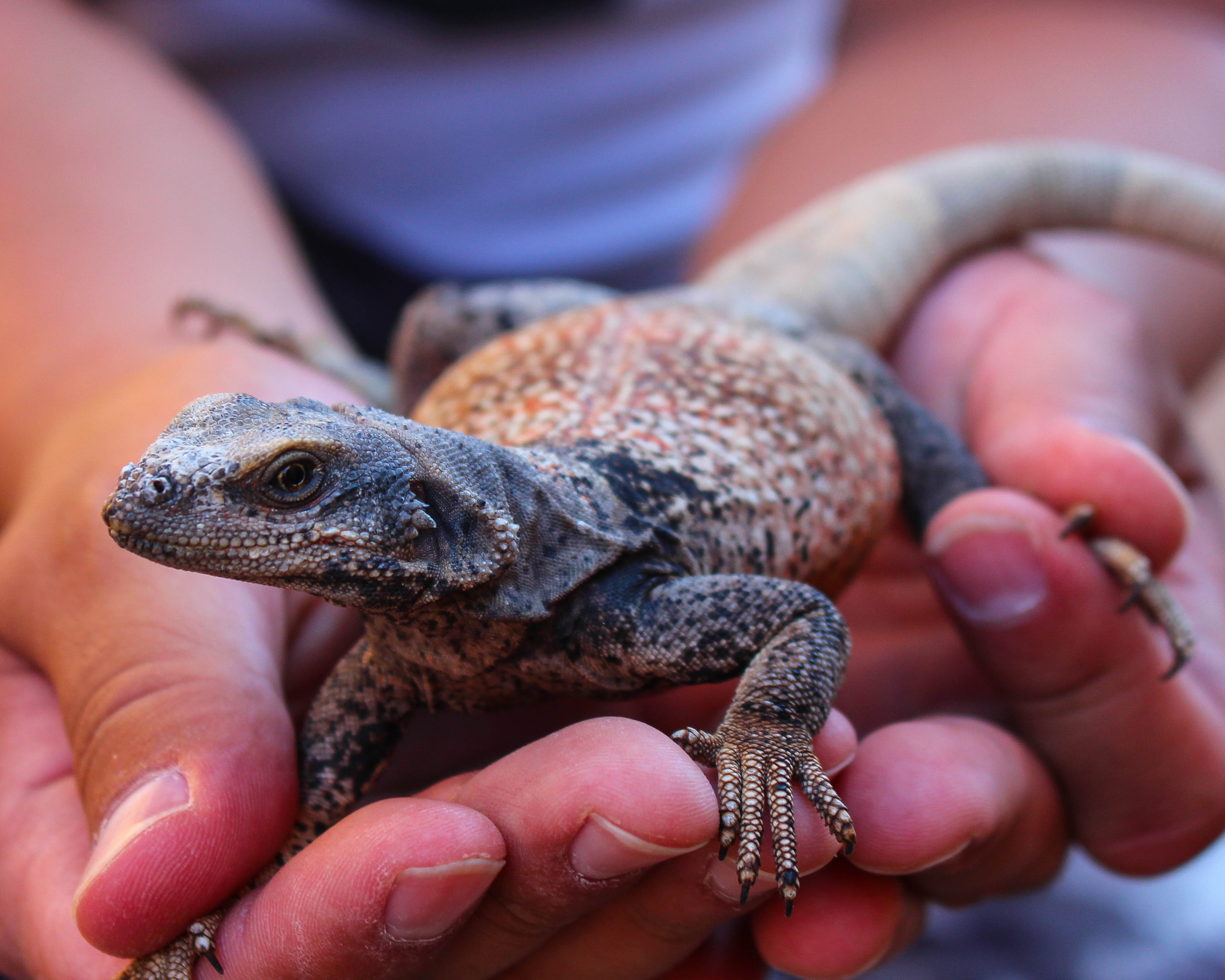
  - Chuckwalla
    †Sauromalus obesus
- Scapanus
- †Sciuravus
- Sciurus
  - †Sciurus olsoni – type locality for species
- †Sequoiadendron
  - †Sequoiadendron chaneyi – type locality for species
  - †Sequoiadendron chaneyii
- †Similidrepan – type locality for genus
  - †Similidrepan pulawskii – type locality for species
- †Sinocapra
  - †Sinocapra willdownsi – type locality for species
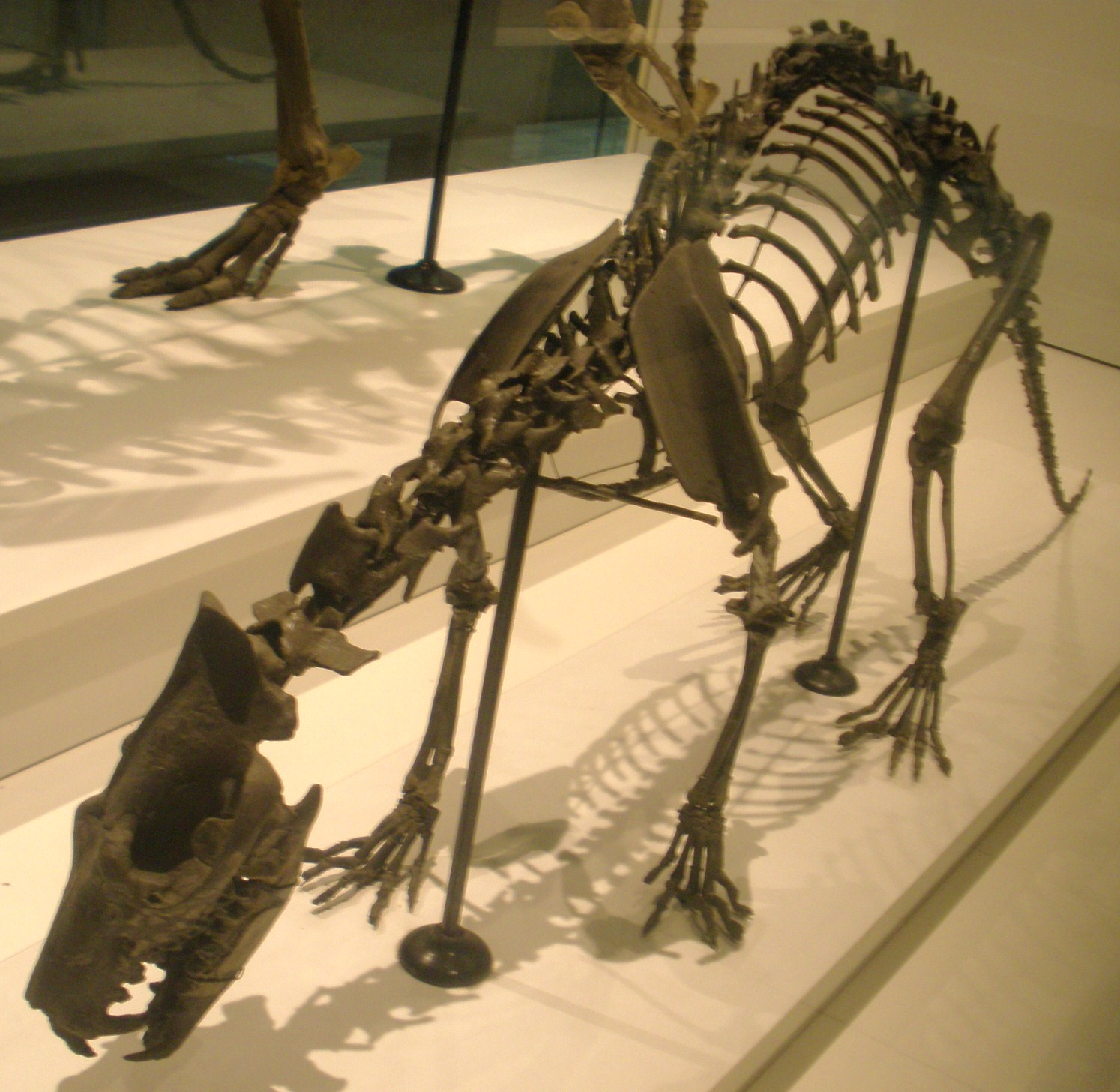
- Fossilized skeleton of the Eocene-Oligocene creodont mammal Sinopa
  †Sinopa
  - †Sinopa rapax
- †Sophora
  - †Sophora spokanensis
- †Sorbus
  - †Sorbus cassiana
  - †Sorbus idahoensis
  - †Sorbus macjannetii
- Sorex
- †Sparganium
  - †Sparganium nevadense
- Spea
  - †Spea alexanderi – type locality for species
- Spermophilus
  - †Spermophilus argonautus
  - †Spermophilus howelli
  - †Spermophilus wellingtonensis
- Sphaerium
- †Sphenophalos
  - †Sphenophalos nevadanus – type locality for species
- †Steneofiber
  - †Steneofiber gradatus
- †Styrax
  - †Styrax middlegatensis
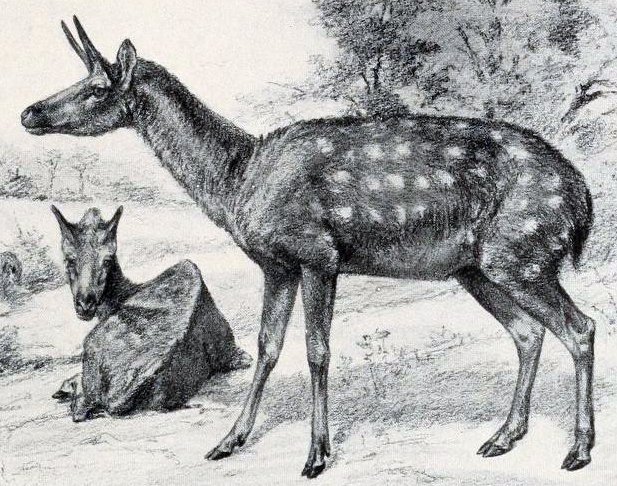
- Life restoration of the Miocene deer relative Subdromomeryx. Robert Bruce Horsfall (1913).
  †Subdromomeryx
  - †Subdromomeryx antilopinus – or unidentified related form
- †Symphoricarpos
  - †Symphoricarpos wassukana – type locality for species

== T ==
- Tamias
  - †Tamias ateles
- †Tardontia
  - †Tardontia nevadans – type locality for species
  - †Tardontia occidentale
- Taxidea
- Taxodium
  - †Taxodium oregonensis
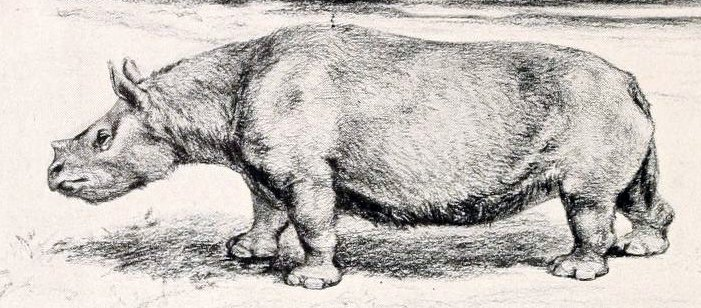
- Restoration of the Miocene-Pliocene rhinoceros Teleoceras
  †Teleoceras
  - †Teleoceras fossiger
  - †Teleoceras hicksi
  - †Teleoceras major
  - †Teleoceras medicornutum
- †Tetrapassalus – tentative report
  - †Tetrapassalus mckennai – or unidentified comparable form
- †Texoceros
- Thomomys
  - †Thomomys carsonensis – type locality for species
- †Thuja
  - †Thuja dimorpha
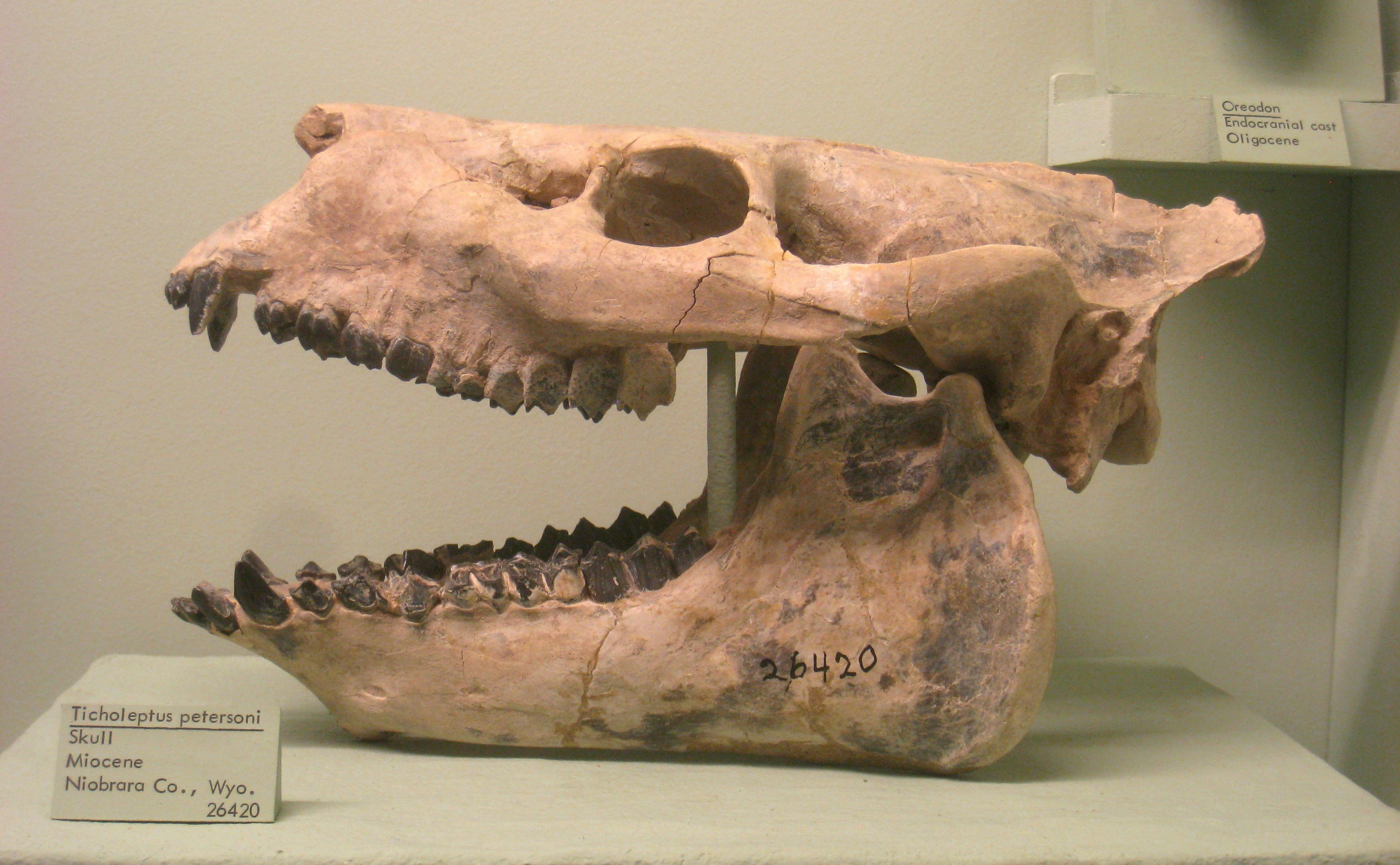
- Fossilized skull of the Miocene oreodont mammal Ticholeptus
  †Ticholeptus
  - †Ticholeptus zygomaticus
- Tipula
  - †Tipula nevadensis – type locality for species
- †Tomarctus
  - †Tomarctus brevirostris
- †Torreya
  - †Torreya nancyana – type locality for species
- †Trogolemur
  - †Trogolemur myodes
- †Tsuga
  - †Tsuga mertensioides
  - †Tsuga sonomensis
- Typha
  - †Typha lesquereuxi
  - †Typha lesquereuxii

== U ==
- †Uintasorex
- Ulmus
  - †Ulmus moorei
  - †Ulmus speciosa
- †Ursavus
  - †Ursavus brevirhinus – or unidentified comparable form
  - †Ursavus pawniensis
  - †Ursavus primaevus – or unidentified comparable form
- Ursus
  - †Ursus abstrusus
  - †Ursus americanus
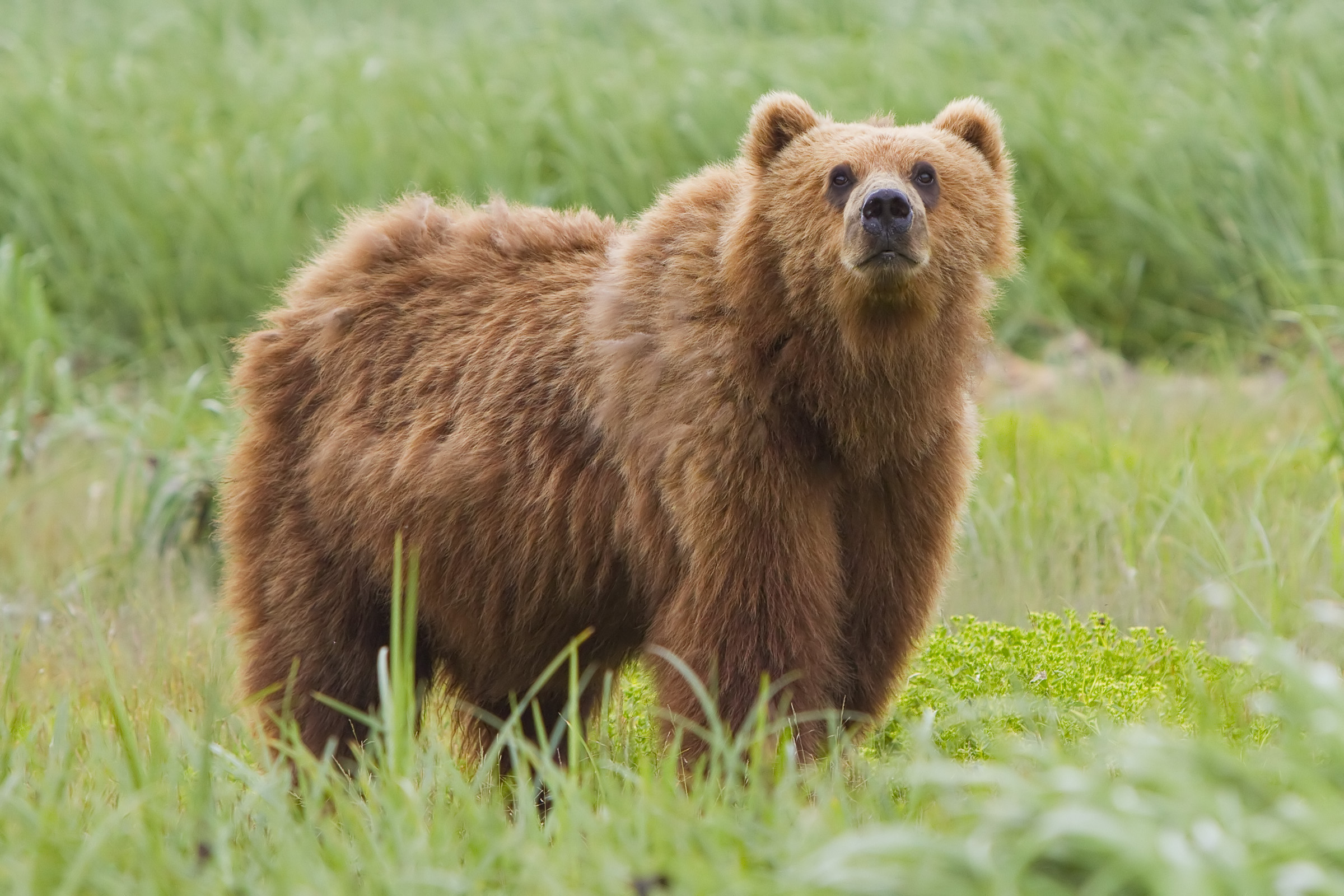
  - A living Ursus arctos, or brown bear
    †Ursus arctos – or unidentified comparable form

== V ==
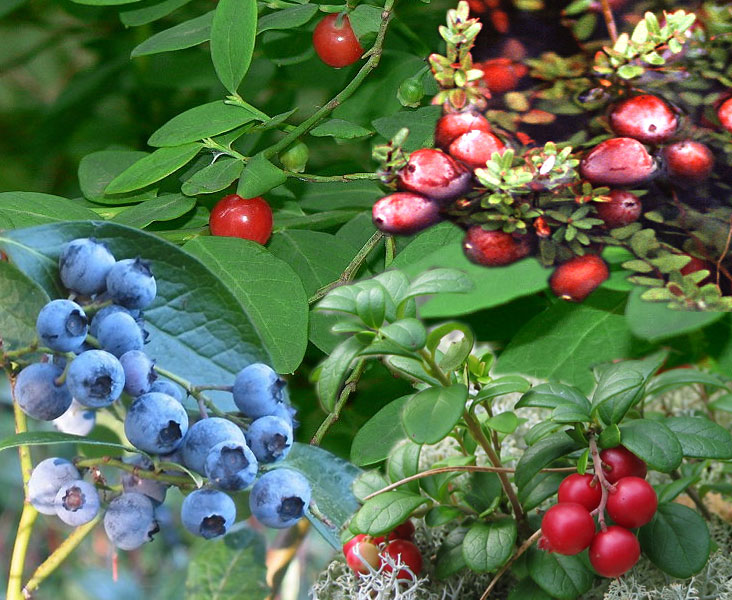
- A variety of modern Vaccinium species, clockwise from top right: cranberries, lingonberries, blueberries, and huckleberries
  †Vaccinium
  - †Vaccinium sophoroides
- †Viverravus
  - †Viverravus minutus
- Vulpes
  - †Vulpes stenognathus

== Z ==
- Zelkova
  - †Zelkova brownii
  - †Zelkova nevadensis – type locality for species
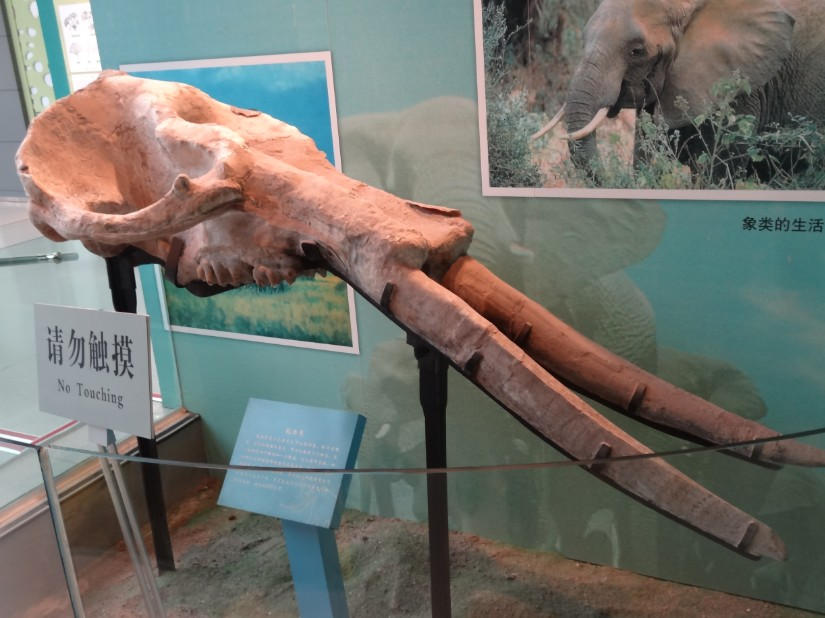
- Fossilized cranium of the Miocene-Pleistocene mastodon relative Zygolophodon
  †Zygolophodon
