= Borophagus dudleyi =

Borophagus dudleyi Temporal range: Late Miocene to Early Pliocene 5.3–4.9 Ma

Scientific classification
- Domain: Eukaryota
- Kingdom: Animalia
- Phylum: Chordata
- Class: Mammalia
- Order: Carnivora
- Family: Canidae
- Genus: †Borophagus
- Species: †B. dudleyi

Binomial name
- †Borophagus dudleyi White, 1941

Extinct species of carnivore

Borophagus dudleyi ("devouring glutton") is an extinct species of the genus Borophagus of the subfamily Borophaginae, a group of canids endemic to North America from the late Hemphillian of the Miocene epoch (5.3 Mya) through the Pliocene epoch (4.9 Mya). Borophagus dudleyi existed for approximately 0.4 million years.

== Overview ==
Borophagus dudleyi was originally named Pliogulo dudleyi by T.E. White in 1941. Borophagus dudleyi, like other Borophaginae, are loosely known as "bone-crushing" or "hyena-like" dogs. Though not the most massive borophagine by size or weight, it had a more highly evolved capacity to crunch bone than earlier, larger genera such as Epicyon, which seems to be an evolutionary trend of the group (Turner, 2004). During the Pliocene epoch, Borophagus began being displaced by Canis genera such as Canis edwardii and later by Aenocyon dirus. Early species of Borophagus were placed in the genus Osteoborus until recently, but the genera are now considered synonyms. Borophagus parvus possibly led a hyena-like lifestyle scavenging carcasses of recently dead animals and hunting prey.

== Taxonomy ==
Borophagus dudleyi was recombined as Cynogulo dudleyi by Kretzoi in 1968. It was recombined again as Osteoborus dudleyi by Webb in 1969 and Munthe in 1998. The animal was then synonymized subjectively with Borophagus crassapineatus by Richey in 1979. In 1987, Richard H. Tedford returned its original name and Xiaoming Wang along with Richard H. Tedford and Beryl E. Taylor concurred in a 1999 examination.

== Morphology ==
Typical features of this genus are a bulging forehead and powerful jaws; it was probably a scavenger. Its crushing premolar teeth and strong jaw muscles would have been used to crack open bone, much like the hyena of the Old World. The adult animal is estimated to have been about 80 cm in length, similar to a coyote, although it was much more powerfully built.

== Fossil distribution ==
Borophagus dudleyi fossil specimens are exclusive to a coastal area of North Carolina.

== Sister genera ==
Carpocyon, Epicyon, Paratomarctus and Protepicyon.

== See also ==
- Borophaginae
