= Juntura Formation =

Geologic formation in Oregon, United States

- Stratigraphic range: Neogene
- Type: Geological formation

Location
- Region: Oregon
- Country: United States

The Juntura Formation is a geologic formation in Oregon. It preserves fossils dating back to the Neogene period.

== Fossil content ==
=== Mammals ===
==== Carnivorans ====
Carnivorans reported from the Juntura Formation
Genus	Species	Presence	Material	Notes	Images
Borophagina	Indeterminate	Kingsbury Gulch & Black Butte.	Distal left humerus fragment (UOMNH F-5514) & partial tooth (UOMNH F-5651).	Possibly assignable to Epicyon or Borophagus littoralis, but too fragmentary to be certain.	
Borophagini	Indeterminate	Kingsbury Gulch & Black Butte.	Many isolated teeth.	Fragmentary teeth unidentified below tribe level.	
Caninae	Indeterminate	Black Butte.	UOMNH F-5862 (teeth).	Formerly assigned to Vulpes but cannot be confidently identified below subfamily level.	
Carpocyon	C. sp.	Black Butte.	UOMNH F-5938 (partial skeleton).	A borophagine dog.	
Epicyon	E. haydeni	Kingsbury Gulch & Black Butte.	UOMNH F-5607 & F-6005.	A borophagine dog.	
Epicyon	E. saevus	Black Butte.	UOMNH F-42501.	A borophagine dog.	

==== Eulipotyphlans ====
Eulipotyphlans reported from the Juntura Formation
Genus	Species	Presence	Material	Notes	Images
Anouroneomys	A. minimus	"UO localities 2500 (Black Butte) and 2337".		A shrew.	

== See also ==
- List of fossiliferous stratigraphic units in Oregon
- Paleontology in Oregon
