= Borophagus parvus =

Borophagus parvus Temporal range: Late Miocene to Early Pliocene (Hemphillian), 10.3–4.9 Ma

Scientific classification
- Domain: Eukaryota
- Kingdom: Animalia
- Phylum: Chordata
- Class: Mammalia
- Order: Carnivora
- Family: Canidae
- Genus: †Borophagus
- Species: †B. parvus

Binomial name
- †Borophagus parvus Wang et al., 1999

Extinct species of carnivore

Borophagus parvus is an extinct species of the genus Borophagus, of the subfamily Borophaginae, a group of canids endemic to North America and lived during the Hemphillian of the Miocene epoch through the Pliocene epoch 10.3—4.9 Ma, existing for approximately 5.4 million years.

== Overview ==
Borophagus, like other Borophaginae, are loosely known as "bone-crushing" or "hyena-like" dogs. Though not the most massive borophagine by size or weight, it had a more highly evolved capacity to crunch bone than earlier, larger genera such as Epicyon, which seems to be an evolutionary trend of the group (Turner, 2004). During the Pliocene epoch, Borophagus began being displaced by Canis genera such as Canis edwardii and later by Canis dirus. Early species of Borophagus were placed in the genus Osteoborus until recently, but the genera are now considered synonyms. Borophagus parvus possibly led a hyena-like lifestyle scavenging carcasses of recently dead animals.

== Taxonomy ==
Paracynarctus was named by Wang et al. (1999). Its type is Paracynarctus sinclairi. It was assigned to Cynarctina by Wang et al. (1999).

== Morphology ==
Typical features of this genus are a bulging forehead and powerful jaws; it was probably a scavenger. Its crushing premolar teeth and strong jaw muscles would have been used to crack open bone, much like the hyena of the Old World. The adult animal is estimated to have been about 80 centimetres (31 in) in length, similar to a coyote, although it was much more powerfully built.
