= Runningwater Formation =

Geologic formation in Nebraska, US

- Stratigraphic range: Early Miocene (Hemingfordian); ~20.6–16.3 Ma
- Type: Formation

Lithology
- Primary: Sandstone
- Other: Conglomerate

Location
- Coordinates: 42.4°N 103.0°W
- Approximate paleocoordinates: 43.1°N 99.1°W
- Region: Nebraska
- Country: United States
- Runningwater Formation (the United States) Runningwater Formation (Nebraska)

The Runningwater Formation is a geologic formation in Nebraska. It preserves fossils dating back to the Hemingfordian of the Early Miocene of the Neogene period. The sandstones and conglomerates of the formation were deposited in a fluvial environment. The formation has provided many fossil mammals.

== Fossil content ==
Among the following fossils have been found in the formation:

Mammals

- Aletomeryx gracilis
- Arretotherium fricki
- Barbouromeryx trigonocorneus
- Cynarctoides acridens
- Cynelos stenos
- Diceratherium niobrarense
- Daphoenodon (Borocyon) robustum
- Desmocyon thomsoni
- Hypertragulus minor
- Menoceras barbouri
- Merychyus arenarum, M. elegans
- Metatomarctus canavus
- Osbornodon iamonensis
- Pseudoblastomeryx advena
- Anchitheriomys stouti
- Desmatippus tyleri
- Edaphocyon lautus
- Amphicyon galushai
- Craterogale cf. simus
- Leptarctus cf. ancipidens
- Leptocyon vulpinus
- Tephrocyon scitulus
- Merycochoerus proprius

Reptiles

- Macrochelys schmidti
- Rhineura marslandensis
- Sceloporus sp.

== See also ==
- List of fossiliferous stratigraphic units in Nebraska
- Paleontology in Nebraska
