= Rhizocyon =

Rhizocyon Temporal range: early Oligocene

Scientific classification
- Kingdom: Animalia
- Phylum: Chordata
- Class: Mammalia
- Order: Carnivora
- Family: Canidae
- Subfamily: †Borophaginae
- Genus: †Rhizocyon; Wang, Tedford, & Taylor, 1999
- Species: †R. oregonensis

Binomial name
- †Rhizocyon oregonensis (Merriam, 1906)
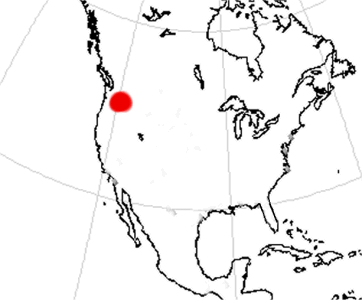
- Range of Rhizocyon based on fossil distribution

Extinct genus of carnivores

Rhizocyon ("root dog") is an early member of the subfamily Borophaginae, an extinct subgroup of canids that were endemic to western North America during the Oligocene epoch, living from ~31—24.5 Ma., existing for approximately 6.5 million years.

Rhizocyon was similar to a contemporary species, Archaeocyon leptodus, from the Great Plains, but it shows a few subtle differences in the structure of the skull and dentition that indicate that Rhizocyon may be close to the ancestry of later borophagines. Only a single species, R. oregonensis, is known and all fossils come from the John Day Formation in Oregon.
