= Oxetocyon =

Oxetocyon Temporal range: Early Oligocene–Late Oligocene

Scientific classification
- Kingdom: Animalia
- Phylum: Chordata
- Class: Mammalia
- Order: Carnivora
- Suborder: Caniformia
- Family: Canidae
- Subfamily: †Borophaginae
- Genus: †Oxetocyon; Green, 1954
- Species: †O. cuspidatus

Binomial name
- †Oxetocyon cuspidatus Green, 1954
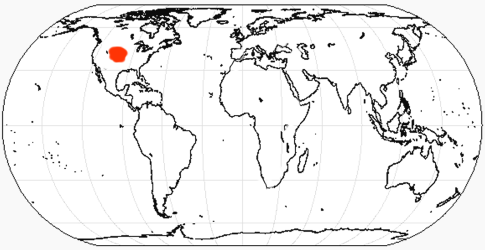
- Range of Oxetocyon based on fossil distribution

Extinct genus of carnivores

Oxetocyon ("beginning dog") is an extinct monospecific genus of the Borophaginae subfamily of canids native to North America. It lived during the Early Oligocene epoch, existing for approximately 2.5 million years. Fossils have been found in Nebraska and South Dakota.

Fossils of Oxetocyon are rare and, as a result, the genus is poorly known, and only the teeth, dentaries, and a fragmentary skull have been reported. The teeth of Oxetocyon indicate a hypocarnivorous diet, as is found in the living raccoon dog, and suggest a potential relationship to the unusual borophagine Otarocyon. Oxetocyon is distinguished from Otarocyon by its own set of dental specializations for an omnivorous diet, particularly by the presence of a cleft that divides each upper molar into front and back halves.
