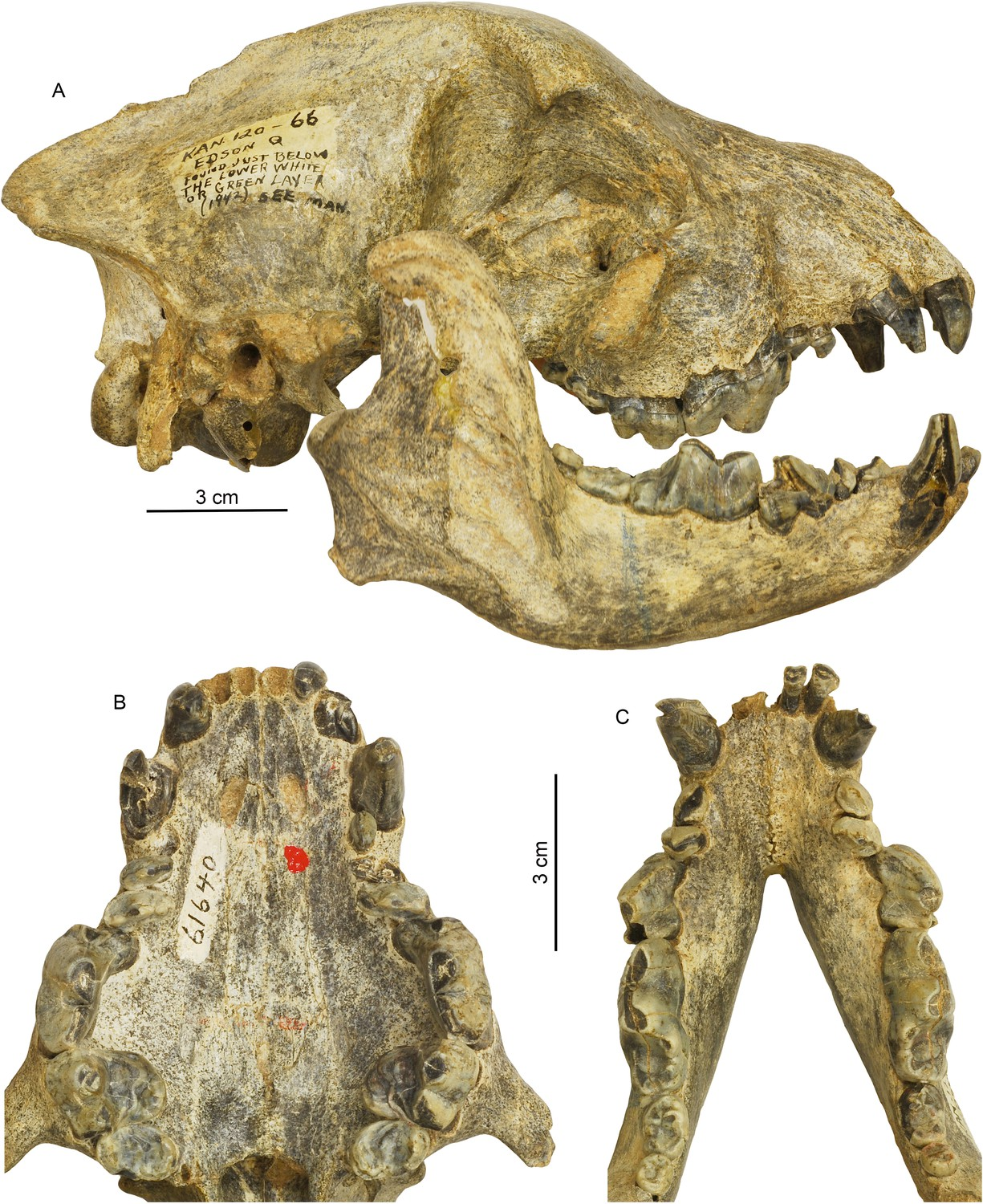
- Borophagus secundus skull

Scientific classification
- Kingdom: Animalia
- Phylum: Chordata
- Class: Mammalia
- Infraclass: Placentalia
- Order: Carnivora
- Suborder: Caniformia
- Family: Canidae
- Genus: †Borophagus
- Species: †B. secundus

Binomial name
- †Borophagus secundus VanderHoof, 1931

Synonyms
- †Hyaenognathus cyonoides; †Hyaenognathus direptor

= Borophagus secundus =

Borophagus secundus Temporal range: 9–5 Ma Late Miocene - Early Pliocene

Extinct species of carnivore

Borophagus secundus ("devouring glutton") is an extinct species of the genus Borophagus of the subfamily Borophaginae, a group of canids endemic to North America during the Late Miocene to Early Pliocene from 9 to 5 Ma. Borophagus secundus existed for approximately 4 million years.

== Overview ==
Borophagus secundus, like other Borophaginae, are loosely known as "bone-crushing" or "hyena-like" dogs. Though not the most massive borophagine by size or weight, it had a more highly evolved capacity to crunch bone than earlier, larger genera such as Epicyon, which seems to be an evolutionary trend of the group (Turner, 2004). During the Pliocene epoch, Borophagus began being displaced by Canis genera such as Canis edwardii. Early species of Borophagus were placed in the genus Osteoborus until recently, but the genera are now considered synonyms.

== Taxonomy ==
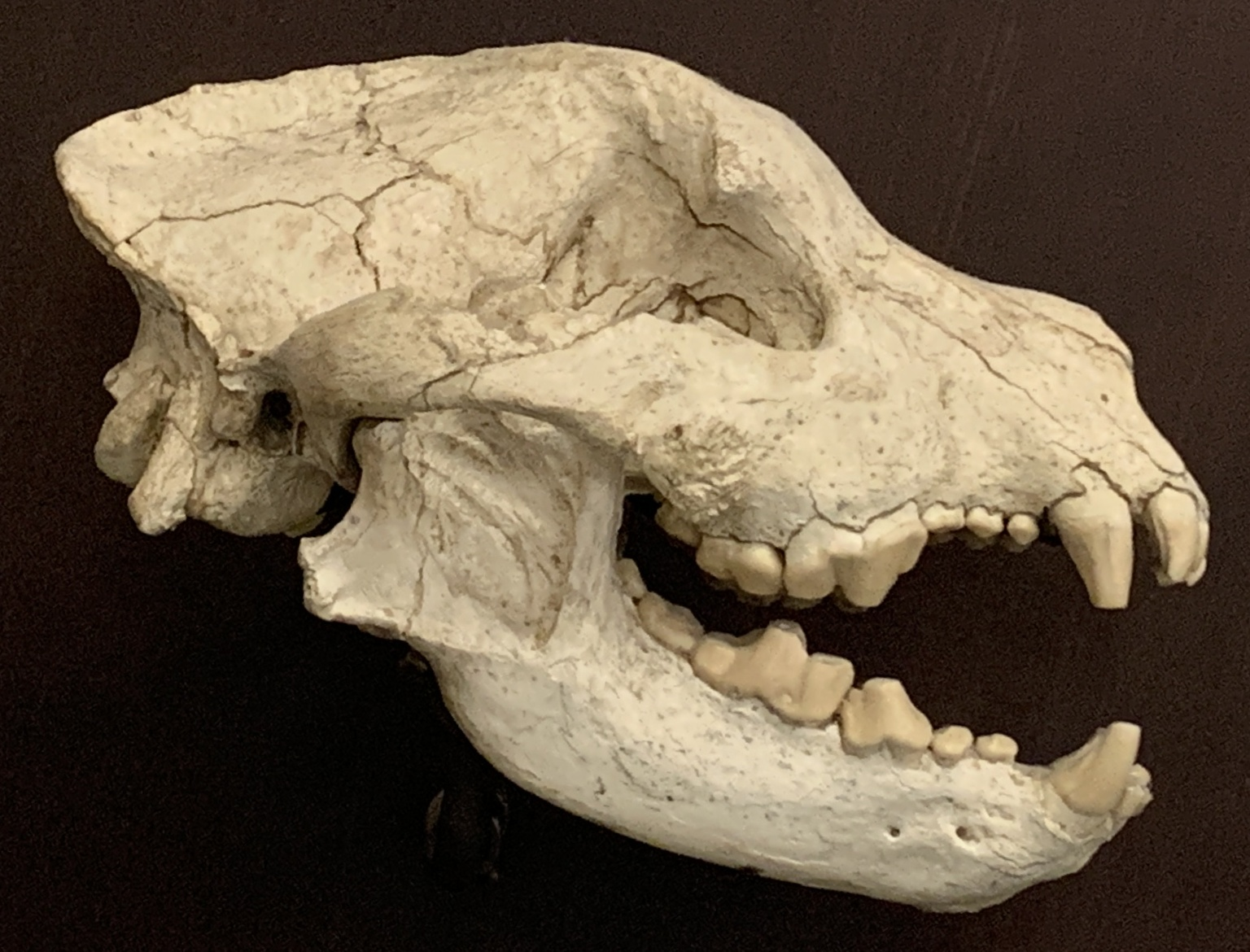
B. secundus, collected from Texas. At the AMNH.

Like other members of its genus, B. secundus had a bulging forehead and powerful jaws; it was considered to be probably a scavenger by paleontologists in the past. Its crushing premolar teeth and strong jaw muscles would have been used to crack open bone, much like the hyena of the Old World. However, B. secundus fossils are so abundant and geographically widespread that some paleontologists now argue that it must have been the dominant carnivore of its time, and thus an active predator because carrion feeding alone could not have sustained such a large population. They note that not all carnivores with bone-cracking ability are scavengers, such as the modern spotted hyena; instead, they interpret the bone-cracking ability as an adaptation to social hunting where complete utilization of a carcass was favored.

The adult animal is estimated to have been about 80 cm in length, similar to a coyote, although it was much more powerfully built.

== Fossil distribution ==
Borophagus secundus fossil specimens are very widespread from Honduras and El Salvador to central Mexico, Oklahoma panhandle, central and southern California, Nebraska, Kansas, and northern New Mexico.
