= Paratomarctus =

Paratomarctus Temporal range: Middle Miocene–Late Miocene

Scientific classification
- Kingdom: Animalia
- Phylum: Chordata
- Class: Mammalia
- Order: Carnivora
- Family: Canidae
- Subfamily: †Borophaginae
- Tribe: †Borophagini
- Subtribe: †Borophagina
- Genus: †Paratomarctus; Wang et al., 1999
- Species: †P. temerarius

Binomial name
- †Paratomarctus temerarius Leidy 1858
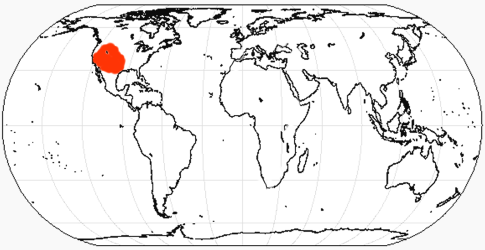
- Range of Paratomarctus based on fossil distribution

Genus of mammals

Paratomarctus is an extinct monospecific genus of the Borophaginae subfamily of canids native to North America. It lived from the Middle to Late Miocene, 16.3 – 5.3 mya, existing for approximately 11 million years. It was about the size of a coyote, and was probably a generalised predator, without the specialised adaptations of most later borophagines.

Paratomarctus was one of the last of the Borophaginae and shared its habitat with other canids, including Borophagus, Epicyon, Carpocyon, Aelurodon, and the true canine, Canis lepophagus. Fossils have been uncovered throughout most of the western United States.
