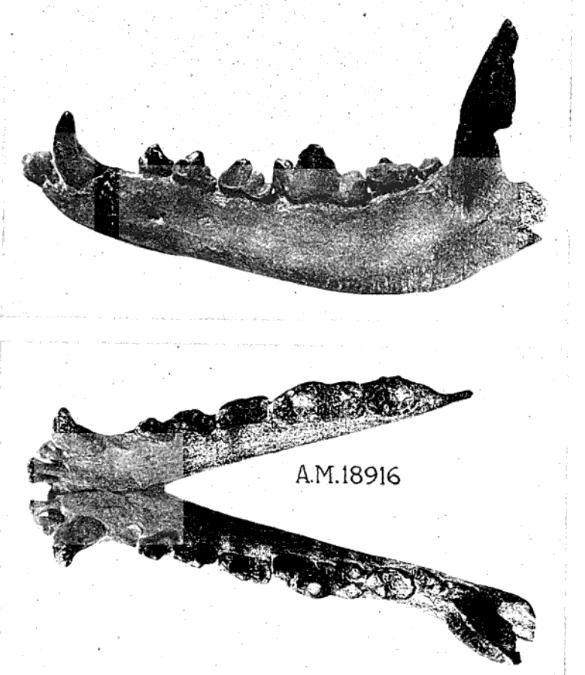
- Holotype of P. optatus

Scientific classification
- Kingdom: Animalia
- Phylum: Chordata
- Class: Mammalia
- Order: Carnivora
- Family: Canidae
- Subfamily: †Borophaginae
- Tribe: †Borophagini
- Genus: †Protomarctus; Wang et al., 1999
- Species: †P. optatus

Binomial name
- †Protomarctus optatus Matthew, 1924

Synonyms
- Tomarctus optatus (Matthew, 1924)

= Protomarctus =

Protomarctus Temporal range: Miocene, Hemingfordian 16.0–13.6 Ma

Extinct genus of borophagine canid

Protomarctus is an extinct monospecific genus of borophagine canid native to North America. It lived during the Middle Miocene 16.0—13.6 Mya, existing for approximately 2.4 million years.

== Description ==
=== Crania ===
Generally, Protomarctus is less robust than the related Tomarctus in proportions of the skull. The nasal sinus of Protomarctus is multichambered and passes the frontal-parietal suture, and is separated by partial septa on the frontal bone. Unlike later borophagines, the postorbital process of Protomarctus is significantly less enlarged, the forehead is less domed and the palate is more narrow. The premaxillary process contacts the nasal process of the frontal bone, and the nuchal crest is expanded to the point where it surpasses the occipital condyle. Protomarctus is also smaller than most other borophagines, though it is around 27% larger than Microtomarctus. The molar morphology of Protomarctus is primitive compared to other borophagines.

=== Postcrania ===
Postcranial material of Protomarctus is known, namely limb bones and phalanges, though they have yet to be described in detail.

== Paleoecology ==
Protomarctus is known from the Sheep Creek formation in Nebraska, the Zia formation in New Mexico as well as the Round Mountain Silt in California. Round Mountain Silt, being a coastal locality, has fossils from both marine and terrestrial fauna; with fish, marine mammals and countless terrestrial mammals being found alongside Protomarctus. The rhinoceros Aphelops, the horses Anchitherium and Merychippus, the protoceratid Prosynthetoceras as well as the amphicyonid Pliocyon are all known to have coexisted with Protomarctus.

== Classification ==
Currently grouped within Borophaginae, Protomarctus was originally named Tomarctus optatus, but was split on morphological grounds.
