= Psalidocyon =

Psalidocyon Temporal range: Early Miocene–Middle Miocene

Scientific classification
- Kingdom: Animalia
- Phylum: Chordata
- Class: Mammalia
- Order: Carnivora
- Family: Canidae
- Subfamily: †Borophaginae
- Tribe: †Borophagini
- Genus: †Psalidocyon; Wang, et al. 1999

Type species
- †Psalidocyon marinae Wang, et al. 1999

Extinct genus of carnivores

Psalidocyon is an extinct genus of the Borophaginae subfamily of canids native to North America. It lived during the Early to Middle Miocene 20.6—13.6 Ma, existing for about 7 mya. Only one species is currently recognised. It was initially found on Skull Ridge, Tesuque, New Mexico. A member of the Borophagini tribe, it was an intermediate-sized canid, with specialisations towards a heavily meat-based diet.
