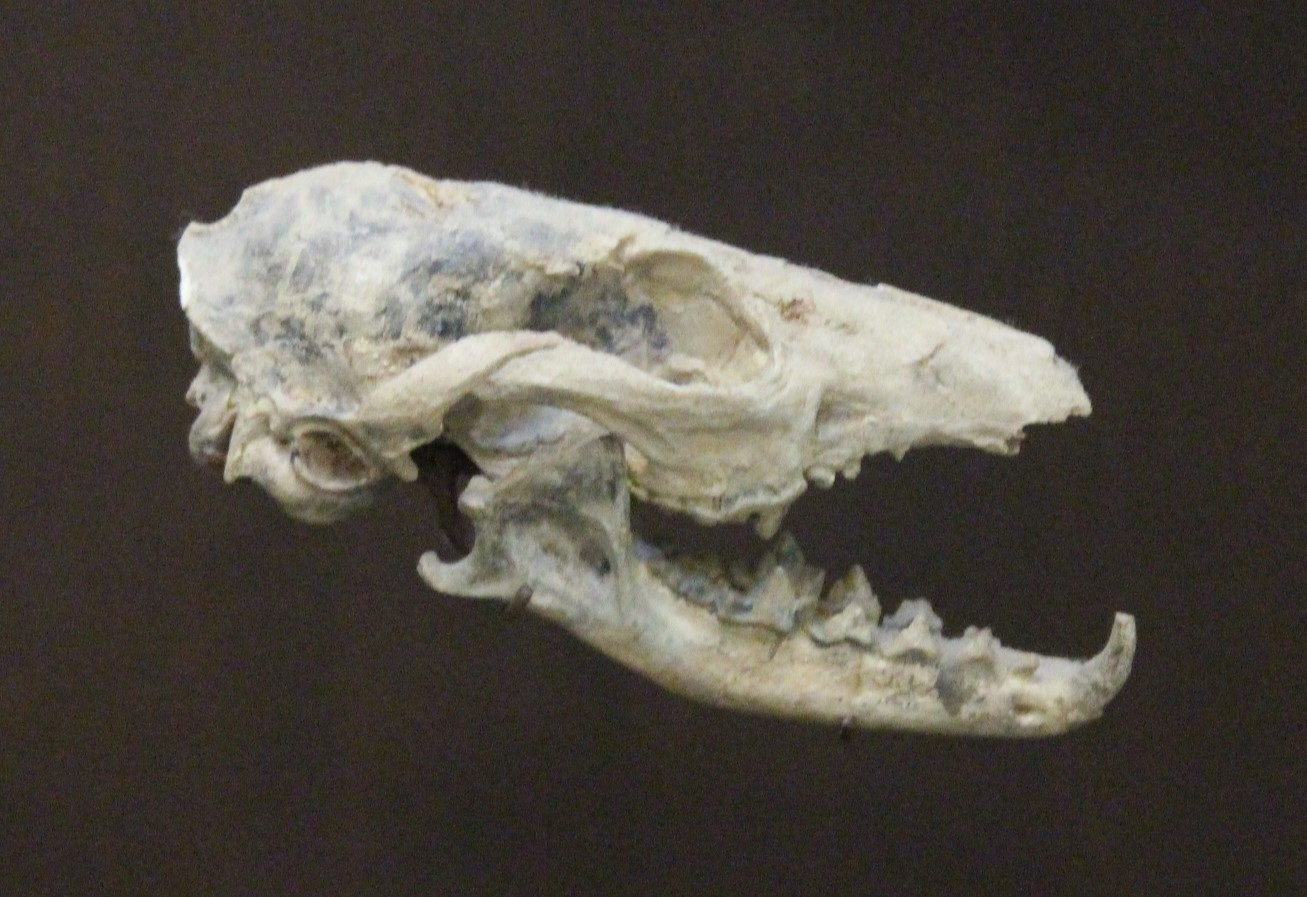
- Cormocyon haydeni, American Museum of Natural History

Scientific classification
- Kingdom: Animalia
- Phylum: Chordata
- Class: Mammalia
- Infraclass: Placentalia
- Order: Carnivora
- Suborder: Caniformia
- Family: Canidae
- Subfamily: †Borophaginae
- Tribe: †Borophagini
- Genus: †Cormocyon; Wang and Tedford, 1992

Species
- C. haydeni; C. copei
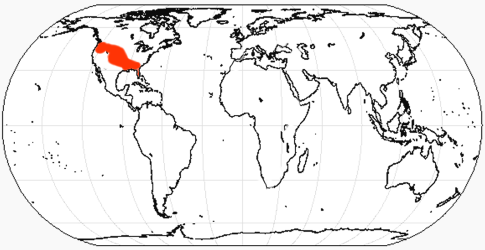
- Range of Cormocyon based on fossil distribution

= Cormocyon =

Cormocyon Temporal range: Oligocene–Early Miocene

Extinct genus of carnivores

Cormocyon is an extinct genus of borophagine canid native to North America. It lived from the Oligocene to the Early Miocene, 30.8—20.6 Mya, existing for about 10.2 million years. It is regarded as a primitive, transitional member of the Borophagini tribe.
