= Protepicyon =

Protepicyon Temporal range: Middle Miocene

Scientific classification
- Kingdom: Animalia
- Phylum: Chordata
- Class: Mammalia
- Order: Carnivora
- Family: Canidae
- Subfamily: †Borophaginae
- Tribe: †Borophagini
- Subtribe: †Borophagina
- Genus: †Protepicyon; Wang et al., 1999
- Species: †P. raki

Binomial name
- †Protepicyon raki Wang et al., 1999

Extinct genus of carnivores

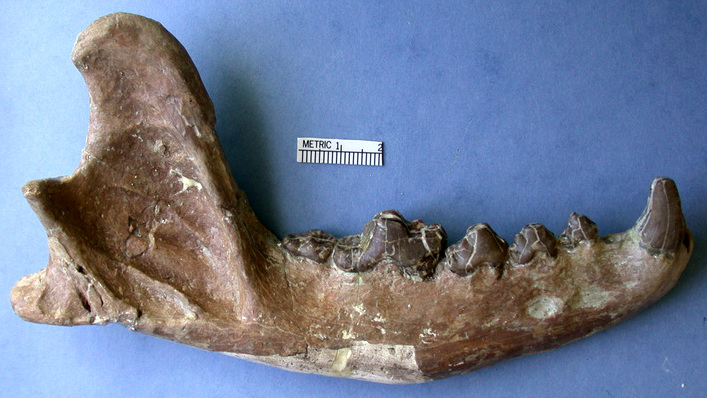
Jaw of Protepicyon raki

Protepicyon is an extinct monospecific genus of the Borophaginae subfamily of canids native to North America. It lived during the Barstovian stage of the Middle Miocene 16.0—13.6 mya. One of the top predators of its time, it was the probable ancestor of the better known Epicyon, and is known from remains in California and New Mexico.
