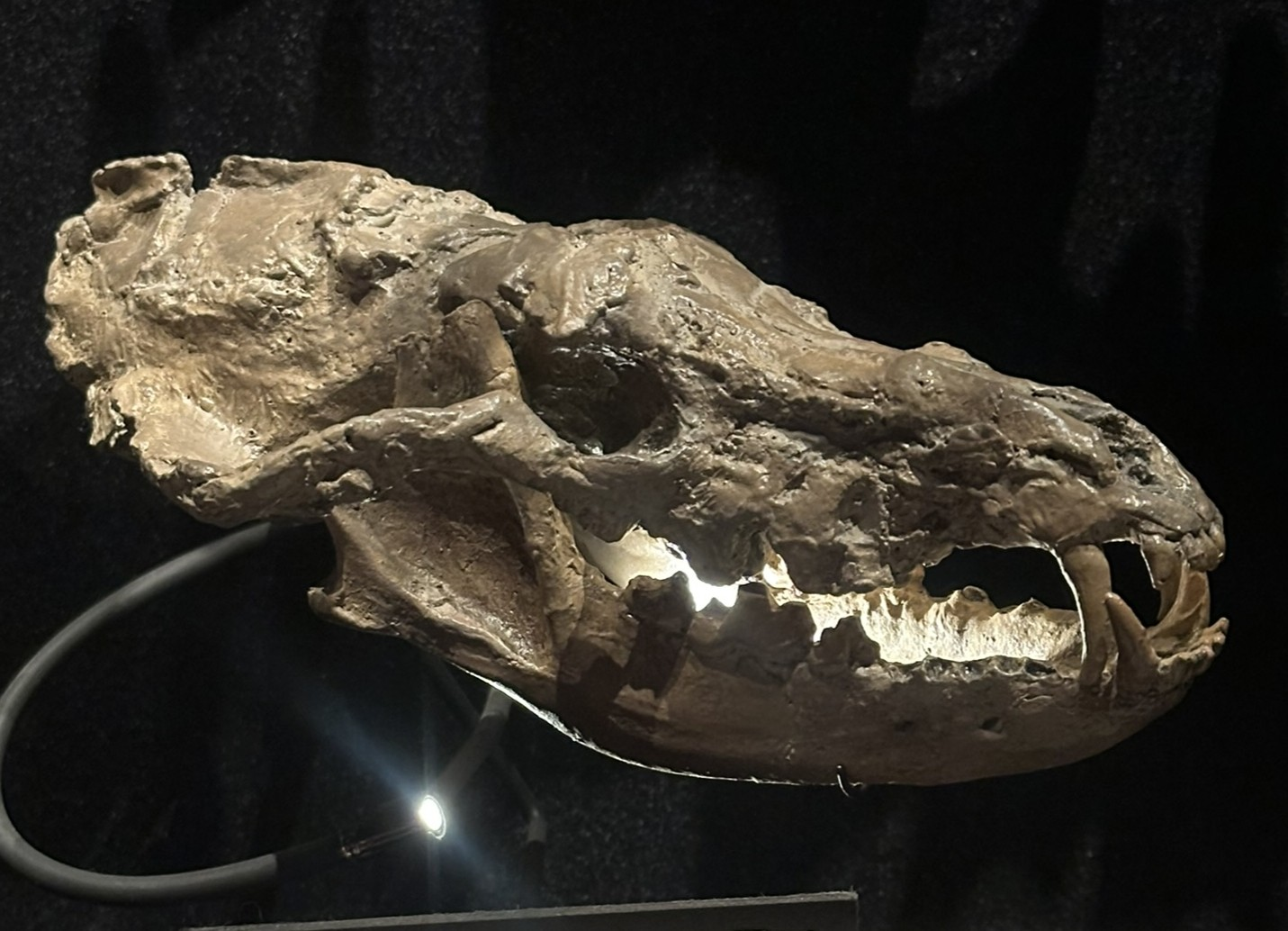
- Fossil skull cast, Florida Museum of Natural History

Scientific classification
- Kingdom: Animalia
- Phylum: Chordata
- Class: Mammalia
- Order: Carnivora
- Family: Canidae
- Subfamily: †Borophaginae
- Tribe: †Borophagini
- Genus: †Metatomarctus; Wang et al., 1999
- Species: †M. canavus

Binomial name
- †Metatomarctus canavus (Simpson, 1932)

= Metatomarctus =

Metatomarctus Temporal range: Early Miocene–Middle Miocene

Extinct genus of carnivores

Metatomarctus is an extinct genus of the Borophaginae subfamily of canids native to North America. It lived during the Early to Middle Miocene, 23–16 Mya, existing for approximately 7 million years It was an intermediate-size canid, and more predaceous than earlier borophagines.

It hunted in packs, like modern canines, and may have preyed upon creatures such as Equus, rodents, and other smaller prey.

== Fossil distribution ==
- Thomas Farm Site, Gilchrist County, Florida, estimated age ~23.3—16.3 Mya.
- Pollack Farm Site, Kent County, Delaware.
- Hackberry Wash, San Bernardino County, California.
- Rattlesnake Hills, Fremont County, Wyoming.
- High Rock Canyon a.k.a. UCMP V-110, Humboldt County, Nevada.
- Ahren's Prospect, Elder Ridge, and Pebble Creek, Runningwater Formation, Dawes County, Nebraska.
- Other fossil locations: Maryland, Wyoming, New Mexico, western Nebraska.
