= Sonitictis =

Sonitictis Temporal range: Middle Miocene

Scientific classification
- Kingdom: Animalia
- Phylum: Chordata
- Class: Mammalia
- Order: Carnivora
- Family: Mustelidae
- Genus: †Sonitictis; Wang et al., 2022

Type species
- †Sonitictis moralesi Wang et al., 2022

Extinct genus of carnivoran mammal

Sonitictis is an extinct genus of mustelid carnivoran mammal that lived in what would become Inner Mongolia during the Middle Miocene Epoch, between 15 and 11 million years ago. The genus Sonitictis contains a single known species, S. moralesi.
