= Paracynarctus =

Paracynarctus Temporal range: Early Miocene–Middle Miocene

Scientific classification
- Kingdom: Animalia
- Phylum: Chordata
- Class: Mammalia
- Order: Carnivora
- Family: Canidae
- Subfamily: †Borophaginae
- Tribe: †Borophagini
- Subtribe: †Cynarctina
- Genus: †Paracynarctus; Wang et al., 1999

Type species
- †Paracynarctus sinclairi

Species
- †P. kelloggi, Merriam 1911; †P. sinclairi, Wang et al. 1999

Extinct genus of carnivores

Paracynarctus ("beside Cynarctus") is an extinct genus of the Borophaginae subfamily of canids native to North America. It lived from the Early Miocene to Middle Miocene 16.0—13.6 Ma, existing for approximately 2.4 million years. It was likely an omnivore, and lacked the bone-cracking adaptations found in some later borophagines.

P. kelloggi was originally found Virgin Valley, Nevada in a Barstovian terrestrial horizon.
