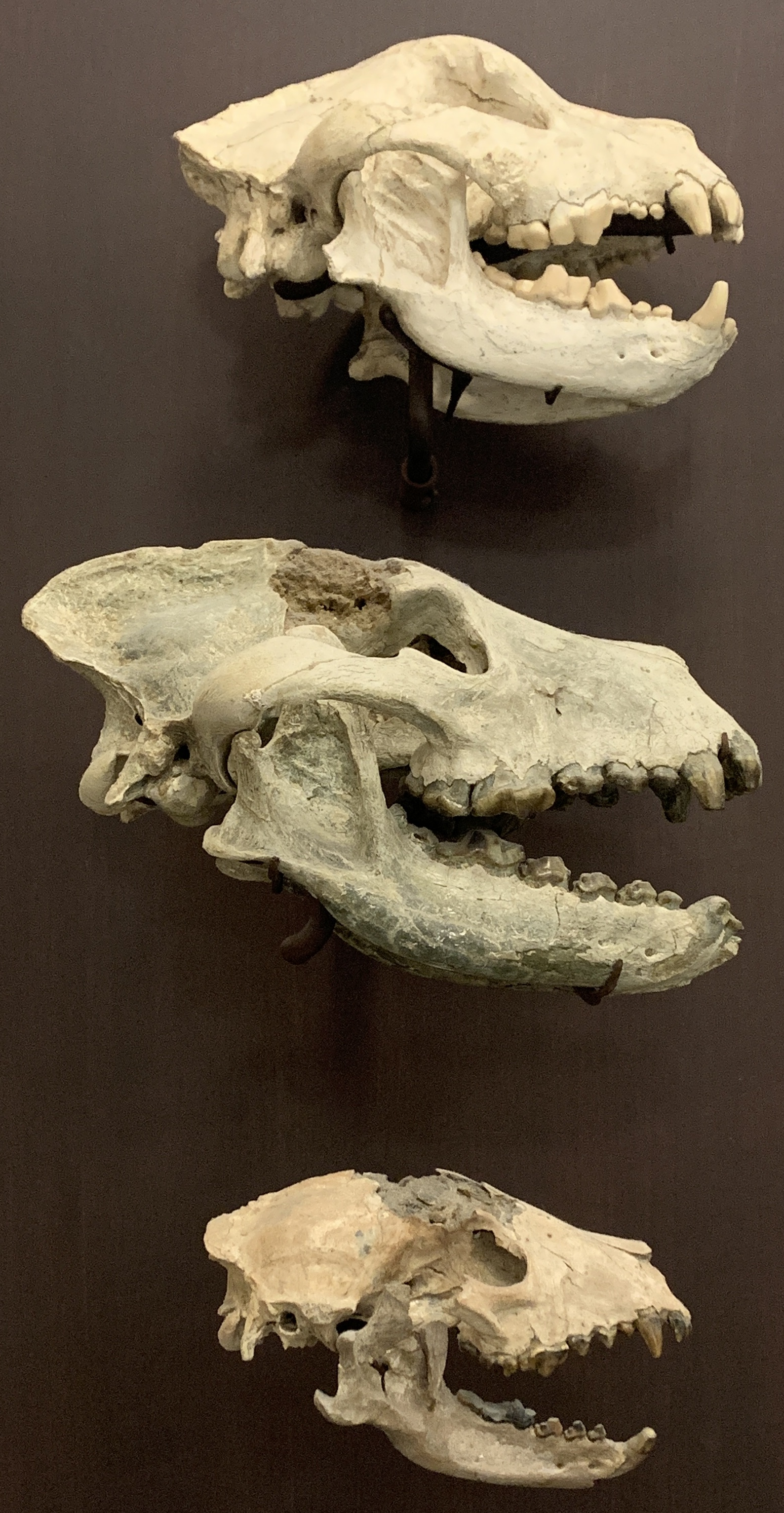
- Borophagus secundus (top), Aelurodon taxoides (middle), Tomarctus brevirostris (bottom).

Scientific classification
- Kingdom: Animalia
- Phylum: Chordata
- Class: Mammalia
- Order: Carnivora
- Family: Canidae
- Subfamily: †Borophaginae
- Tribe: †Borophagini; Simpson, 1945

Subgroups
- †Cormocyon; †Desmocyon; †Metatomarctus; †Euoplocyon; †Psalidocyon; †Microtomarctus; †Protomarctus; †Tephrocyon; †Aelurodontina; †Aelurodon; †Tomarctus; †Borophagina; †Cynarctina
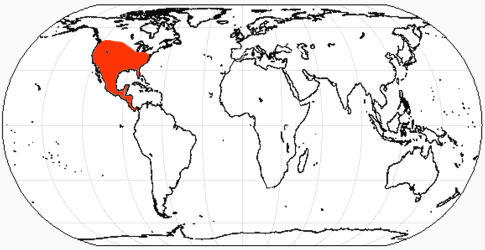
- Range of Borophagini based on fossil distribution

= Borophagini =

Borophagins Temporal range: Oligocene-Early Pliocene

Extinct clade of carnivores

Borophagini is a clade or tribe of the subfamily Borophaginae. This is an extinct group of terrestrial canids that were endemic and widespread throughout North America and Central America which lived during the Geringian stage of the Oligocene epoch to the Zanclean age of the Early Pliocene living 30.8—3.6 Mya existing approximately 27.2 million years.

== Biology ==
Borophagini were short-faced, heavy-jawed canids, usually massive in size. They were primarily carnivores but dentition demonstrates omnivore traits.

== Taxonomy ==
Borophagini was named by Simpson (1945) [credited to Simpson because he named Borophaginae]. It was assigned to Borophaginae by Wang et al. (1999) and Wang et al. (2004).

=== Subtaxa and sister taxa ===
The subtaxa or subtribes are: Aelurodontina, Borophagina, and Cynarctina. Phlaocyonini is a sister taxon.

== Genera ==
- Tribe †Borophagini (30—3 Ma)
  - †Cormocyon (30—20 Ma)
  - †Desmocyon (25—16 Ma)
  - †Metatomarctus (19—16 Ma)
  - †Euoplocyon (18—16 Ma)
  - †Psalidocyon (16—13 Ma)
  - †Microtomarctus (21—13 Ma)
  - †Protomarctus (20—16 Ma)
  - †Tephrocyon (16—14 Ma)
  - Subtribe †Cynarctina (20—10 Ma)
    - †Paracynarctus (19—16 Ma)
    - †Cynarctus (16—12 Ma)
  - Subtribe †Aelurodontina (20—5 Ma)
    - †Tomarctus (23—16 Ma)
    - †Aelurodon (16—12 Ma)
  - Subtribe †Borophagina
    - †Paratomarctus (16—5 Ma)
    - †Carpocyon (16—5 Ma)
    - †Protepicyon (16—12 Ma)
    - †Epicyon (12—10 Ma)
    - †Borophagus (=Osteoborus) (12—5 Ma)

== Fossil distribution ==
With the clade comprising many genus and subtaxa, the distribution of fossil specimens for Borophagini is widespread throughout the entire continent extending from coast to coast as well as Florida to western Oregon to Panama.
