= Protovis =

Protovis Temporal range: Late Miocene-Late Pliocene

Scientific classification
- Kingdom: Animalia
- Phylum: Chordata
- Class: Mammalia
- Order: Artiodactyla
- Family: Bovidae
- Subfamily: Caprinae
- Genus: †Protovis
- Species: †P. himalayensis

Binomial name
- †Protovis himalayensis Wang, Li & Takeuchi, 2016

Species of prehistoric sheep

Protovis himalayensis is a prehistoric species of sheep found in latest Miocene to Late Pliocene-aged strata of Himalayan Tibet in 2016.

Protovis was found only by some fragments such as its horns. Its discovery showed that modern mountain sheep first evolved from the genus Protovis.
