= Euoplocyon =

Scientific classification
- Kingdom: Animalia
- Phylum: Chordata
- Class: Mammalia
- Order: Carnivora
- Family: Canidae
- Subfamily: †Borophaginae
- Tribe: †Borophagini
- Genus: †Euoplocyon; Matthew, 1924

Type species
- † Euoplocyon praedator Douglass, 1903

Species
- † Euoplocyon brachygnathus † Euoplocyon spissiden

Extinct genus of carnivores

Euoplocyon is an extinct genus of the Borophaginae subfamily of canids native to North America. It lived during the Early to Middle Miocene, 20.6—13.6 Mya, existing for about 7 million years. A member of the Borophagini tribe, it was an intermediate-sized canid, with specialisations towards a heavily meat-based diet.

== Species ==
- E. brachygnathus (syn. Aelurodon brachygnathus, E. praedator) Douglass 1903, discovered at the Flint Creek Beds, a Miocene terrestrial horizon in Montana.
- E. spissidens (syn. Aelurocyon spissidens, Enhydrocyon spissidens) White 1947, discovered at the Alachua Formation, Alachua County, Florida.
