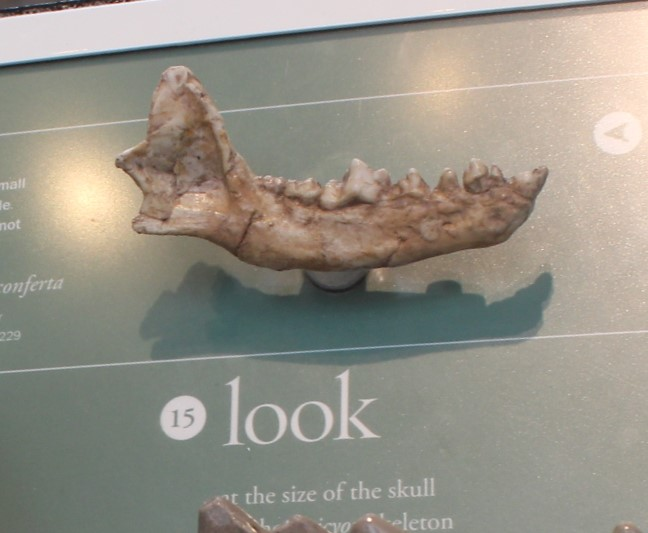
- Replica of lower jaw at the Natural History Museum of Los Angeles County

Scientific classification
- Kingdom: Animalia
- Phylum: Chordata
- Class: Mammalia
- Order: Carnivora
- Family: Canidae
- Subfamily: †Borophaginae
- Tribe: †Borophagini
- Genus: †Microtomarctus; Wang et al., 1999
- Species: †M. confertus

Binomial name
- †Microtomarctus confertus Matthew, 1918

= Microtomarctus =

Microtomarctus Temporal range: Early Miocene–Middle Miocene

Extinct genus of carnivores

Microtomarctus is an extinct monospecific genus of the Borophaginae subfamily of canids native to North America. It lived during the Early to Middle Miocene, and existed for approximately 7 million years. Fossil specimens have been found in Nebraska, coastal southeast Texas, California, New Mexico, Nevada, and Colorado. It was an intermediate-size canid, and more predaceous than earlier borophagines.

Like some other borophagines it had powerful, bone-crushing jaws and teeth.
