= Dogs: Their Fossil Relatives and Evolutionary History =

2008 book by Xiaoming Wang and Richard H. Tedford

- Author: Xiaoming Wang and Richard H. Tedford
- Language: English
- Genre: Reference
- Publisher: Columbia University Press
- Publication date: 2008
- Pages: 232 pp
- ISBN: 0-231-13528-9
- OCLC: 185095648
- Dewey Decimal: 599.77/2 22
- LC Class: QL737.C22 W36 2008

Dogs: Their Fossil Relatives and Evolutionary History is a book by Xiaoming Wang and Richard H. Tedford. It was published in 2008 by Columbia University Press. The book offers a "holistic picture of canid evolution" and an overview of existing and extinct taxa, also detailing the evidence for the domestication and evolution of domestic dogs from their wolf ancestors. It has received particular praise for its in-depth coverage of Chinese canids.
