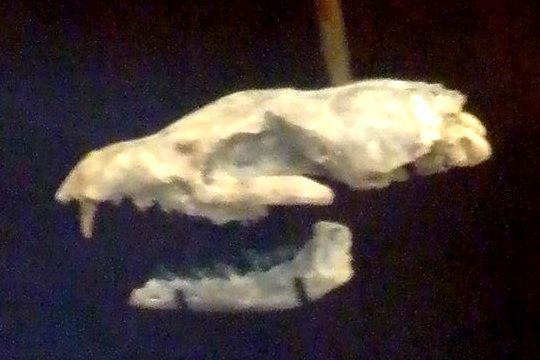
- Skull of Archaeocyon leptodus

Scientific classification
- Kingdom: Animalia
- Phylum: Chordata
- Class: Mammalia
- Order: Carnivora
- Family: Canidae
- Subfamily: †Borophaginae
- Genus: †Archaeocyon; Wang, Tedford, & Taylor, 1999

Type species
- †Pseudocynodictis pavidus

Species
- †A. falkenbachi Wang et al. 1999; †A. leptodus Schlaikjer 1935; †A. pavidus Stock 1933
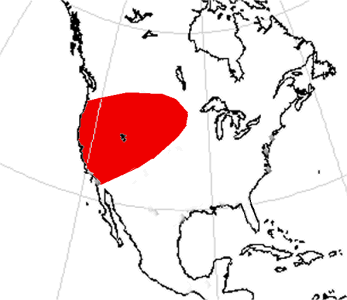
- Range of Archaeocyon based on fossil distribution

= Archaeocyon =

Archaeocyon Temporal range: Oligocene

Extinct genus of carnivores

Archaeocyon ("ancient dog") is an extinct genus of the Borophaginae subfamily of canids native to North America. It lived during the Oligocene epoch 32-24 Ma., existing for approximately 8 million years. Species of Archaeocyon are among the earliest known borophagines, although a species of Otarocyon has a slightly earlier first appearance. Fossils have been found across the northern Great Plains and along the west coast of North America.

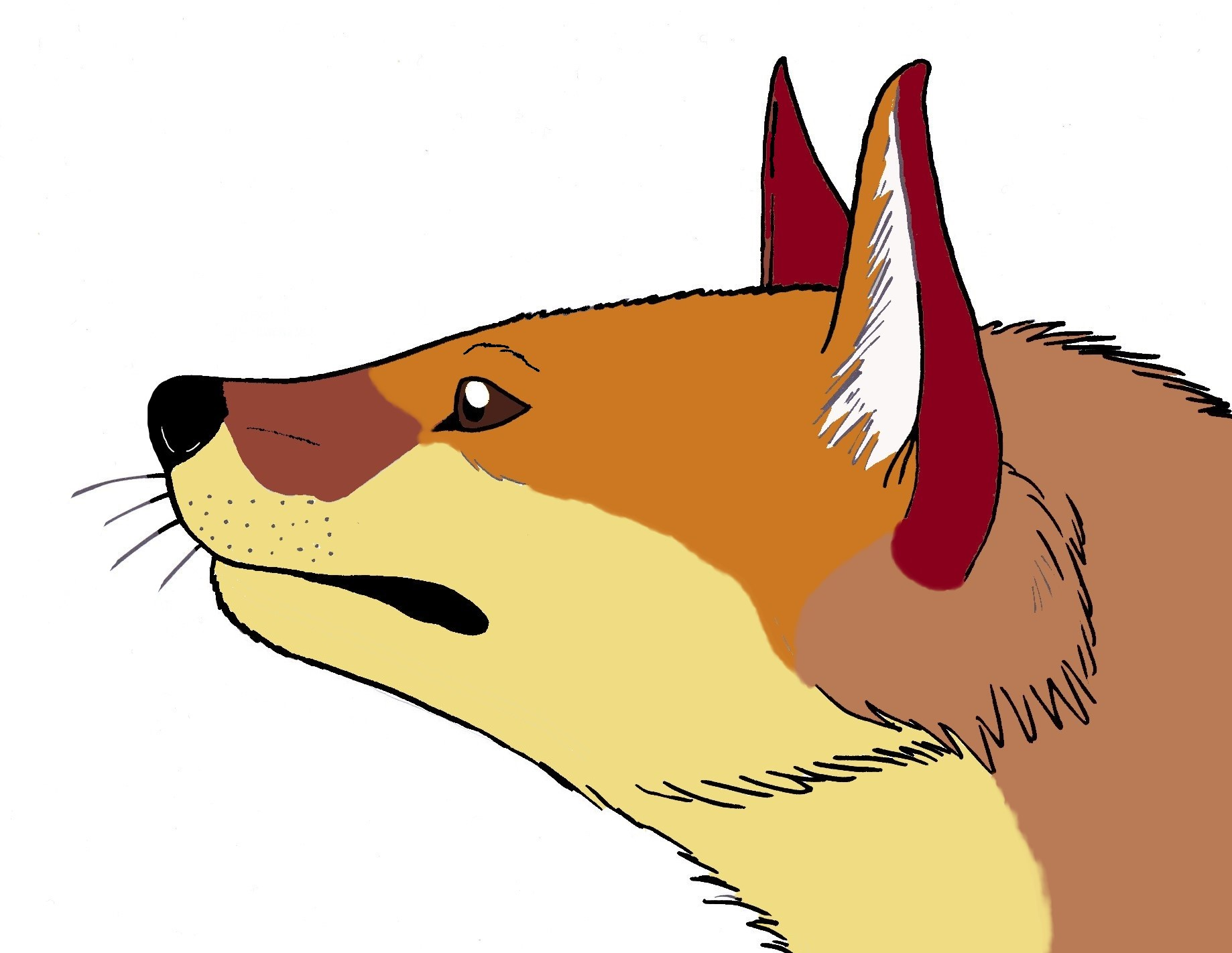
Life restoration

Archaeocyon was a comparatively small and unspecialized dog. Its dentition (teeth) suggests a slightly more hypocarnivorous (omnivorous) diet than the otherwise similar Hesperocyon. The skeleton is also generalized, lacking specializations for running and retaining a plantigrade foot posture.

A few derived features of the dentition support a relationship to Borophaginae and Caninae (the subfamily that includes living canids), rather than to the basal canid subfamily Hesperocyoninae. The temporal position of Archaeocyon suggests an affinity to borophagines because the first members of Caninae appear substantially earlier.

== Species ==
Three species of Archaeocyon have been described. The two earlier species, A. pavidus and A. leptodus, differ primarily in size, with A. leptodus being larger. The third species, A. falkenbachi, is the size of A. leptodus and differs from other Archaeocyon species in having a shorter, broader skull.
