= Cynarctina =

Cynarctinans Temporal range: Early Miocene–Middle Miocene

Scientific classification
- Domain: Eukaryota
- Kingdom: Animalia
- Phylum: Chordata
- Class: Mammalia
- Order: Carnivora
- Family: Canidae
- Subfamily: †Borophaginae
- Tribe: †Borophagini
- Subtribe: †Cynarctina

Genera
- Paracynarctus; Cynarctus

Extinct subtribe of carnivores

Cynarctina is an extinct clade of the Borophaginae subfamily of canids native to North America. They lived from the Early to Middle Miocene 16.0—10.3 Ma, existing for approximately 5.7 million years. Cynarctines had rounded cusps on the molar teeth, similar to those seen in living bears, suggesting that they were likely omnivores.
