= Borophagina =

Borophaginans Temporal range: Miocene–Pliocene

Scientific classification
- Domain: Eukaryota
- Kingdom: Animalia
- Phylum: Chordata
- Class: Mammalia
- Order: Carnivora
- Family: Canidae
- Subfamily: †Borophaginae
- Tribe: †Borophagini
- Subtribe: †Borophagina; X. Wang, 1999

Genera
- Paratomarctus; Carpocyon; Protepicyon; Epicyon; Borophagus

Extinct subtribe of carnivores

Borophagina is a subtribe of the Borophaginae, a group of extinct canids. They inhabited much of North America from the Early Miocene to the Zanclean stage of the Pliocene, 20.6—3.6 Mya, and existed for approximately 17 million years.

Like some other borophagines, they were short-faced, heavy-jawed canids although the group included both omnivorous and hypercarnivorous species.
