= Richard H. Tedford =

American paleontologist (1929–2011)

Richard Hall Tedford
- Born: April 25, 1929; Encino, California
- Died: July 15, 2011 (aged 82); Demarest, New Jersey
- Education: Chemistry B.A., University of California, Los Angeles; Ph.D., 1959, University of California, Berkeley
- Known for: Curator Emeritus, Department of Vertebrate Paleontology, American Museum of Natural History, New York City
- Scientific career
- Fields: Paleontology

Richard Hall Tedford (April 25, 1929 – July 15, 2011) was Curator Emeritus in the Department of Vertebrate Paleontology of the American Museum of Natural History in New York City, having been named as curator in 1969.

Born in Encino, California, he received a bachelor's degree from the University of California, Los Angeles with a major in chemistry and earned his Ph.D. from the University of California, Berkeley in 1959.

Tedford was one of the foremost authorities on the evolution of Carnivores and had been working, often with Prof. Xiaoming Wang, on the fossil history of the Canidae establishing the basis on the evolutionary relationship of canids over the past 40 million years.

Tedford was a resident of Demarest, New Jersey at the time of his death on July 15, 2011, having earlier lived in nearby Cresskill. After suffering from colon cancer, his death followed a skull fracture that resulted from an accidental fall in his home.

For his work on tertiary mammals uncovered at the Australian Fossil Mammal Sites (Riversleigh), he was commemorated in the epithet of an Eocene microbat species Rhinonicteris tedfordi.

== Publications ==
- Phylogenetic systematics of the North American fossil Caninae (Carnivora, Canidae) 2009
- Dogs: Their Fossil Relatives and Evolutionary History. Xiaoming Wang and Richard H. Tedford, ISBN 978-0-231-13529-0
- Phylogenetic systematics of the Borophaginae (Carnivora, Canidae) / Xiaoming Wang, Richard H. Tedford, Beryl E. Taylor. New York : American Museum of Natural History, c1999.
- The terrestrial Eocene-Oligocene transition in North America, 433–452. New York: Cambridge University Press, Wang, X.-M., and R.H. Tedford. 1996. Canidae. In D.R. Prothero and R.J. Emry (editors)
- Ancestry: evolutionary history, molecular systematics, and evolutionary ecology of Canidae. The biology and conservation of wild canids. New York: Oxford University Press, Wang, X.-M., R.H. Tedford, B. Van Valkenburgh, and R.K. Wayne. 2004.
- Review of some Carnivora (Mammalia) from the Thomas Farm local fauna (Hemingfordian, Gilchrist County, Florida) by Richard H. Tedford, American Museum of Natural History, 1976

Late Cenozoic Yushe Basin, Shanxi Province, China: Geology and Fossil Mammals, Richard Tedford, Zhan-Xiang Qiu, Lawrence Flynn 2012
