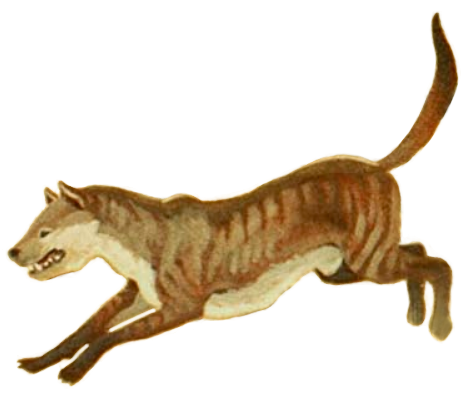

Scientific classification
- Kingdom: Animalia
- Phylum: Chordata
- Class: Mammalia
- Order: Carnivora
- Family: Canidae
- Subfamily: †Borophaginae
- Tribe: †Borophagini
- Genus: †Tephrocyon; Merriam, 1906

Species
- T. rurestris, Condon 1896; T. scitulus, Hay 1924

= Tephrocyon =

Tephrocyon Temporal range: Middle Miocene

Extinct genus of carnivores

Tephrocyon is an extinct genus of the Borophaginae subfamily of canids native to North America. They lived during the Barstovian stage of the Middle Miocene 16.3—13.6 million years ago, existing for roughly 2.7 million years. It is a rarely found genus, with fossil deposits only occurring in western Nebraska, Wyoming, eastern Oregon, New Mexico, and north Florida. It was an intermediate-sized canid, and more predatory than earlier borophagines.
