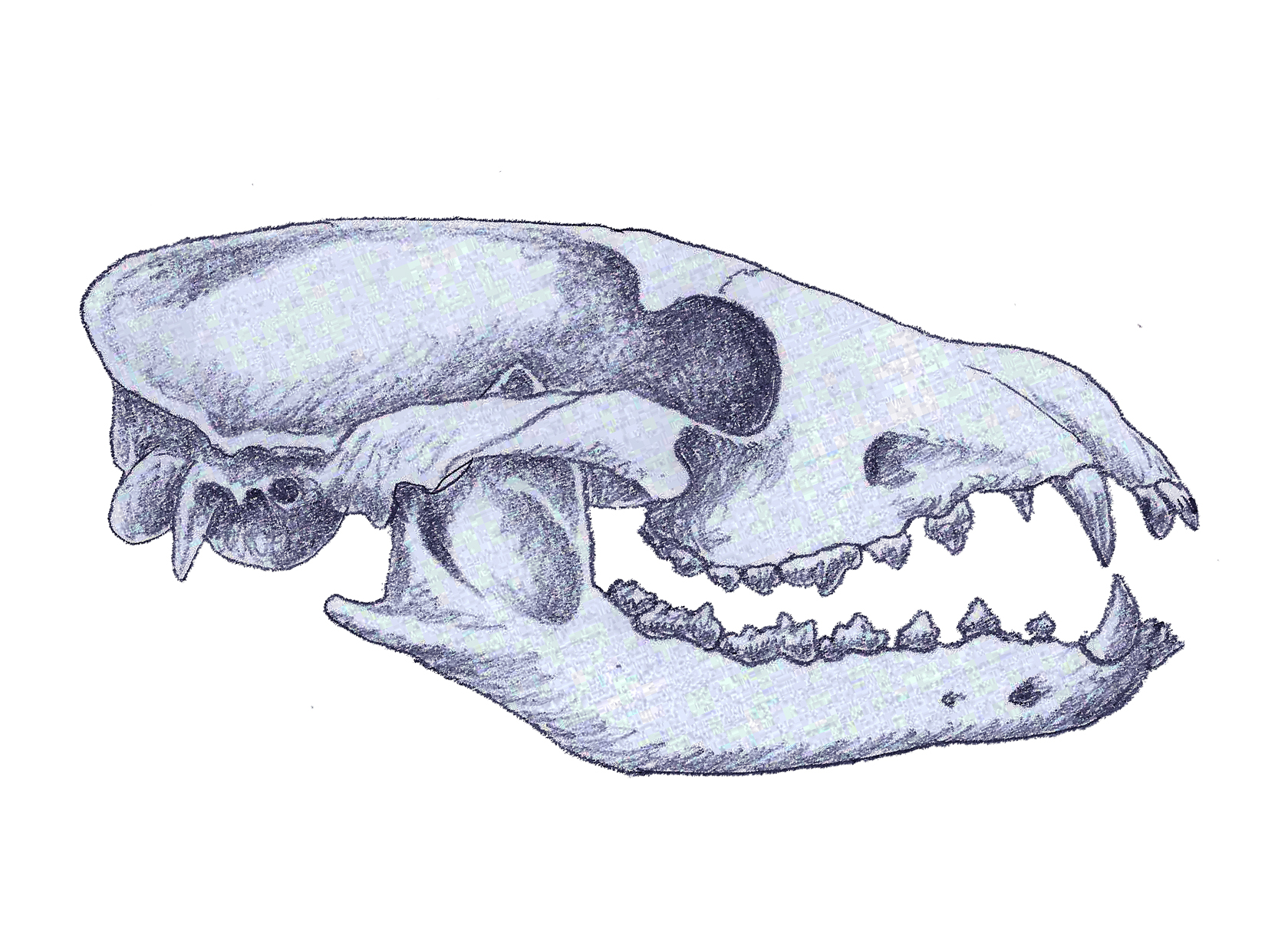
- Cynarctus Skull

Scientific classification
- Kingdom: Animalia
- Phylum: Chordata
- Class: Mammalia
- Order: Carnivora
- Family: Canidae
- Subfamily: †Borophaginae
- Tribe: †Borophagini
- Subtribe: †Cynarctina
- Genus: †Cynarctus; Matthew, 1902

Type species
- †Cynarctus saxatilis

Species
- "C, acridens", Barbour and Cook 1914; C. crucidens, Barbour and Cook 1914; "C. fortidens", Hall "et al." 1962; C. galushai, Wang et al. 1999; C. marylandica, Berry 1938; C. saxatilis, Matthew 1902; C. voorhiesi, Wang wt al. 1999; C. wangi, Jasinski & Wallace 2015

= Cynarctus =

Cynarctus Temporal range: Middle Miocene–Late Miocene

Extinct genus of carnivores

Cynarctus is an extinct genus of borophagine canids native to North America. The genus and type species (Cynarctus saxitilis) were named by W. D. Matthew in 1901, based on a pair of lower jaws found in the Pawnee Creek Beds of Colorado. Cynarctus lived during the Middle to Late Miocene, about 16.0—10.3 mya. Fossils have been uncovered in Colorado, California, Maryland, western Nebraska, and Texas. It was likely an omnivore, and lacked the bone-cracking adaptations found in some later borophagines. At one point it was described as dog-like raccoon, combining characteristics from Canidae with Procyonidae. More subtle qualities of the skull show that it was a true canid in the subfamily Borophaginae.

== Species ==
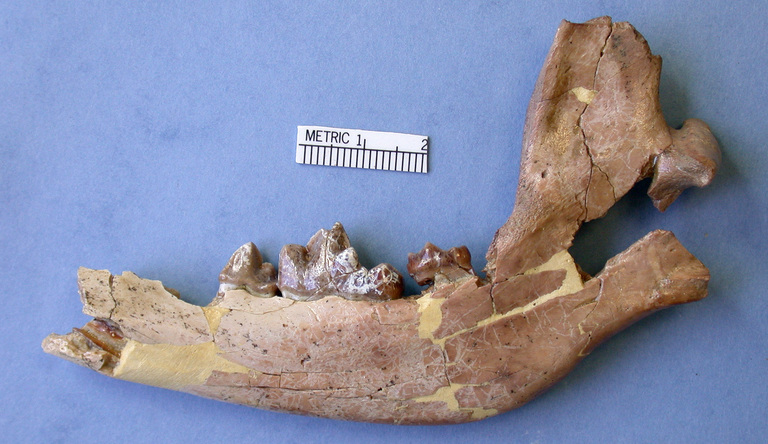
C. galushai skull

=== Cynarctus crucidens ===
Found by Mr. A. C. Whitford, from the Department of Geology at The University of Nebraska, and collected for the Nebraska Geological Survey in 1913. This species of Cynarctus is represented by a right lower jaw that was located in beds (Lower Pliocene) in Sioux County, Nebraska. Having an almost complete dentition, it was found to have slight differences in the structure of the mouth/jaw area from the species of C. saxatilis. Findings confirmed that the premolars were more reduced, teeth were narrower, canine smaller, and that the jaw was relatively longer and more slender than species C. saxatilis.

=== Cynarctus acridens ===
Collected by Erwin H. Barbour and Harold J. Cook, for the same Nebraska Geological Survey in 1913, as the species C. crucidens was found. This species is also represented by a part of a lower right jaw and is considered to be the smallest that has so far been discovered. It differs from the species C. saxitilis and C. crucidens, whom have a heavy and broad posterior cinguli, by having a comparatively very weak posterior cingulum.

=== Cynarctus fortidens ===
A part of a right maxilla (Early Pliocene age) was located 75 feet above stream on the west side of Turkey Creek in Donely County, Texas. The fossil was obtained by W. W. Dalquest, during June 1960. The principal cusps of the teeth are rounded, suggesting that it was mainly frugivorous. This species differs from C. crucidens as it lacks an accessory cusp between the protocone and paracone of the fourth upper premolar.
