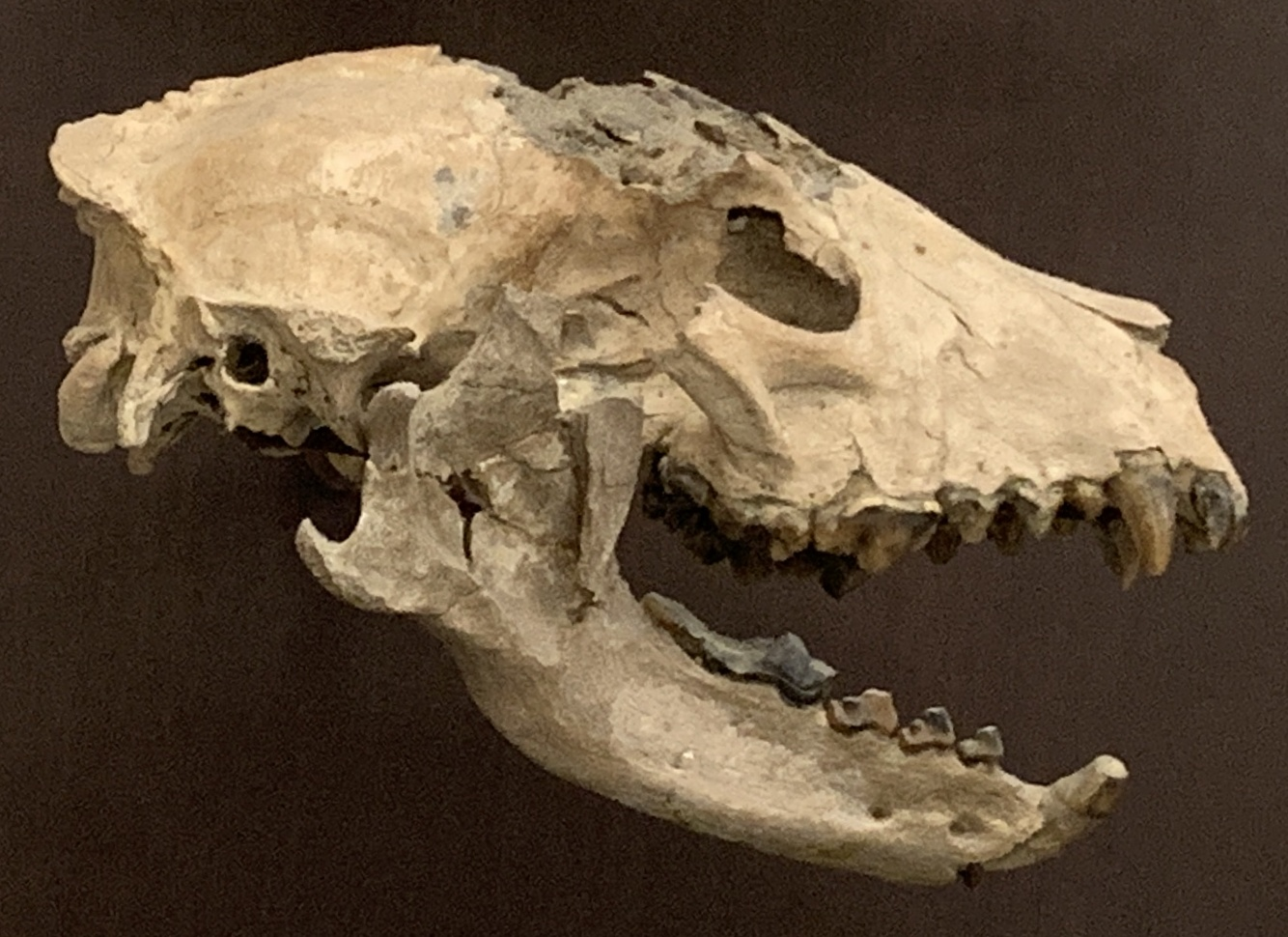
- T. brevirostris (=T. temerarius), collected from Nebraska. At the AMNH.

Scientific classification
- Kingdom: Animalia
- Phylum: Chordata
- Class: Mammalia
- Order: Carnivora
- Family: Canidae
- Subfamily: †Borophaginae
- Tribe: †Borophagini
- Subtribe: †Aelurodontina
- Genus: †Tomarctus; Cope, 1873

Type species
- †Tomarctus brevirostris

Species
- †T. brevirostris; †T. hippophaga
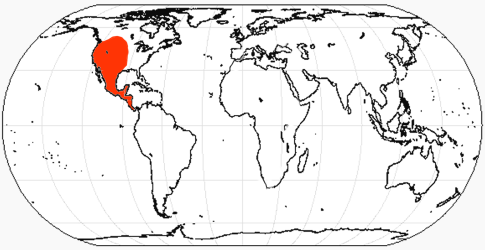
- Range of Tomarctus based on fossil distribution

= Tomarctus =

Tomarctus Temporal range: early to middle Miocene 20.43–13.6 Ma

Extinct genus of carnivores

Tomarctus is a genus of borophagine canid which inhabited most of North America during the late Early Miocene to the Early Barstovian age of the Middle Miocene (23—16 million years ago).

== Description ==
=== Crania ===
Similar to other borophagines, Tomarctus had a short, robust skull. The muzzle especially was short and broad, though not as broad as the related Borophagus. The saggital and lambdoidal crests of Tomarctus are enlarged, indicating strong jaw muscles. The teeth are highly specialized for crushing and shearing, with the teeth and dentary portion of the mandible being robust. A widened forehead and more complex sinus morphology can distinguish Tomarctus from Protomarctus. The premolars are enlarged. Endocranial casts of Tomarctus have been found, with the inferred shape of the brain being similar to modern canids.

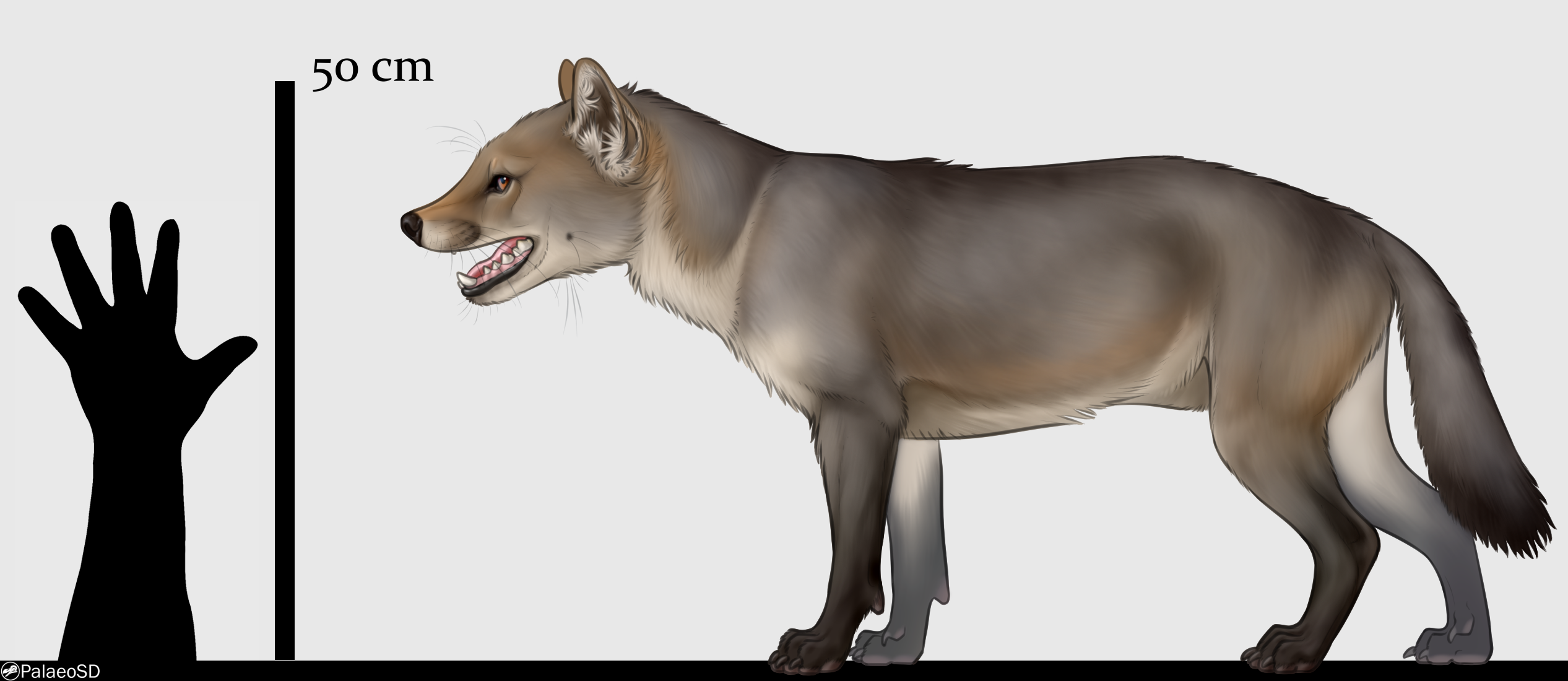
Reconstruction of Tomarctus brevirostris

=== Postcrania ===
The forelimbs of Tomarctus are robust, and not adapted for pursuing prey quickly. The humerus has deep olecranon fossae (pits on the posterior end of the humerus), as well as an entepicondylar foramen, a trait lost in the later borophagines. The ulna is broad, and the radius has a distinct process on the anterior surface. The tibia of Tomarctus lacks muscular grooves. The middle phalanx is short and the claw is more elongate than those of related borophagines. Tomarctus was likely digitigrade, unlike more primitive canids.

== Paleoecology ==
Tomarctus is known from many Miocene North American localities, including the Olcott formation. The Olcott formation was a fluvial depositional site, which experienced frequent flooding. The area was highly diverse; Tomarctus lived alongside a variety of bear dogs, the mylagaulid Umbogaulus, the chalicothere Moropus, ancient horses like Archaeohippus and Cormohipparion, giant mustelids, and the bone-crushing canid Cynarctoides. Tomarctus' hunting style is not entirely known, with limb proportions indicating either an ambush or pursuit predator lifestyle. Some authors posit that Tomarctus was similar to modern day jackals and coyotes.

== Classification ==
The genus currently contains two accepted species, Tomarctus brevirostris and Tomarctus hippophaga. Historically, the genus has had more species assigned to it, though the validity of those species is questioned. Tomarctus is considered a basal borophagine and is grouped closest with Aelurodon.
