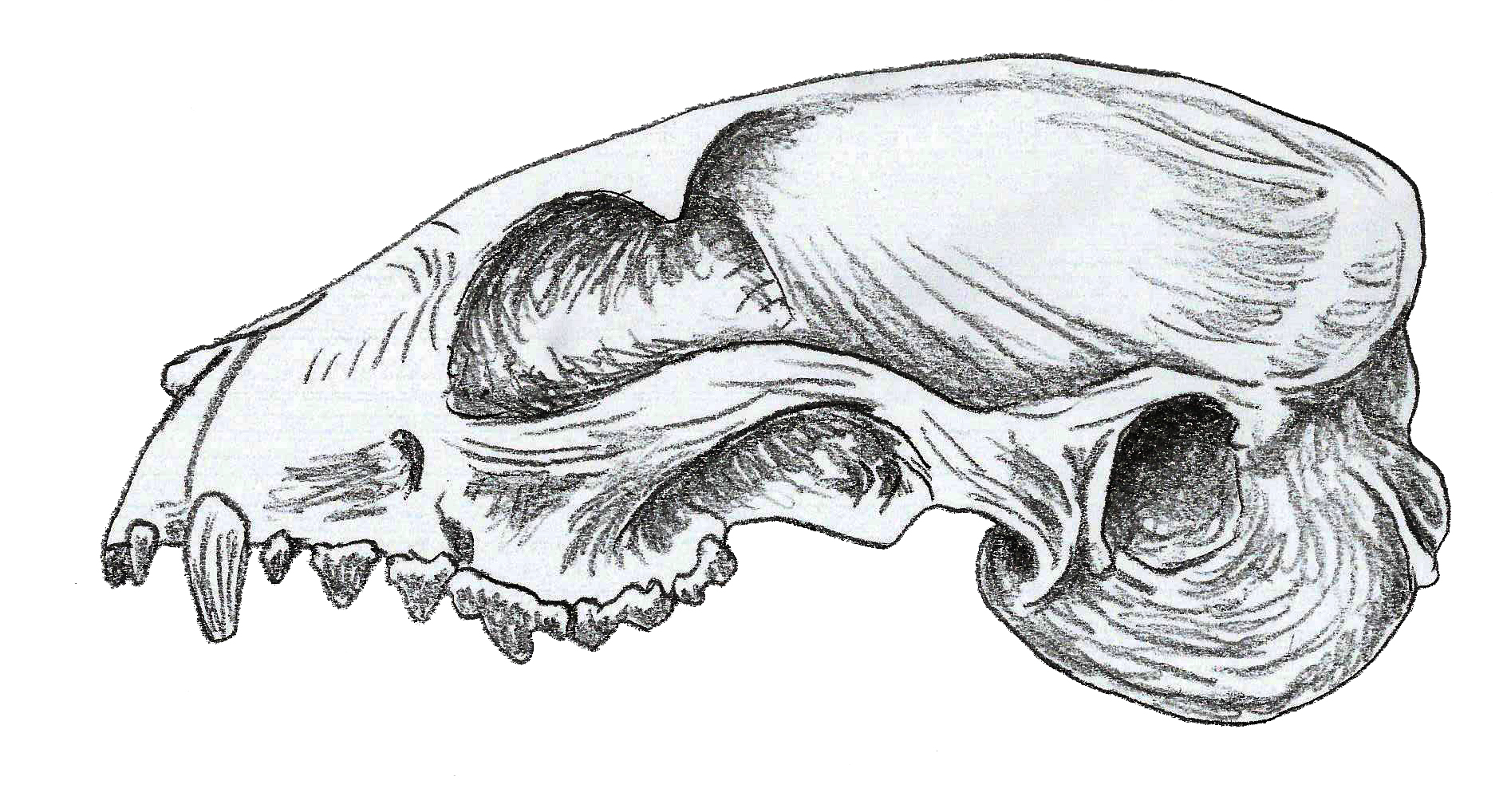
- Skull of Otarocyon cooki

Scientific classification
- Kingdom: Animalia
- Phylum: Chordata
- Class: Mammalia
- Order: Carnivora
- Family: Canidae
- Subfamily: †Borophaginae
- Genus: †Otarocyon; Wang, Tedford, & Taylor, 1999

Type species
- †Cynodesmus cooki

Species
- †O. cooki; †O. macdonaldi
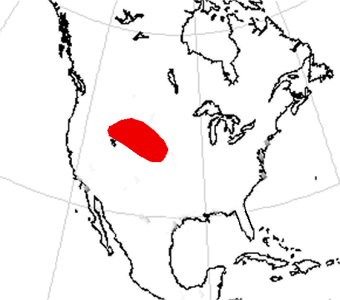
- Range of Otarocyon based on fossil distribution

= Otarocyon =

Otarocyon Temporal range: Oligocene

Extinct genus of carnivores

Otarocyon ("large eared dog") is an extinct genus of the Borophaginae subfamily of canids native to North America. It lived during the Oligocene epoch, about 33.3—20.6 Ma (million years ago). Fossils have been found only in Montana, Wyoming, and South Dakota.

Otarocyon was a small borophagine characterized by a short, broad skull, a specialized middle ear, simple, tall premolar teeth, and molars that are incipiently adapted to a hypocarnivorous diet. Despite its Oligocene age, the skull of Otarocyon shows several striking similarities to the living fennec fox, particularly in the structure of its middle ear. The similarities are probably convergent, but they suggest that Otarocyon may have been similar in its appearance and habits.

== Species ==
- O. macdonaldi Wang et al. 1999, Early Oligocene
- O. cooki Macdonald 1963, Late Oligocene

In addition to its earlier age, O. macdonaldi differs from O. cooki in being smaller and in showing lesser development of the specializations that characterize the genus. O. macdonaldi is also the earliest known member of the subfamily Borophaginae, although the later appearing Archaeocyon was more primitive.
