= Desmocyon =

Desmocyon Temporal range: Oligocene–Early Miocene

Scientific classification
- Kingdom: Animalia
- Phylum: Chordata
- Class: Mammalia
- Order: Carnivora
- Family: Canidae
- Subfamily: †Borophaginae
- Tribe: †Borophagini
- Genus: †Desmocyon; Wang et al., 1999

Species
- †D. matthewi; †D. thomsoni
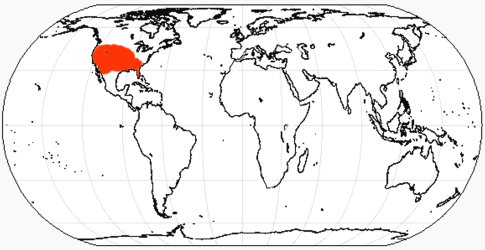
- Range of Desmocyon based on fossil distribution

Extinct genus of carnivores

Desmocyon is an extinct genus of the Borophaginae subfamily of canids native to North America. It lived from the Late Oligocene to the Early Miocene, 24.8—16.3 Mya, existing for approximately 8.5 mya. It is a rarely found genus, with fossil deposits only occurring in western Nebraska, Wyoming, New Mexico and north Florida. It is regarded as a primitive, transitional member of the Borophagini tribe.
