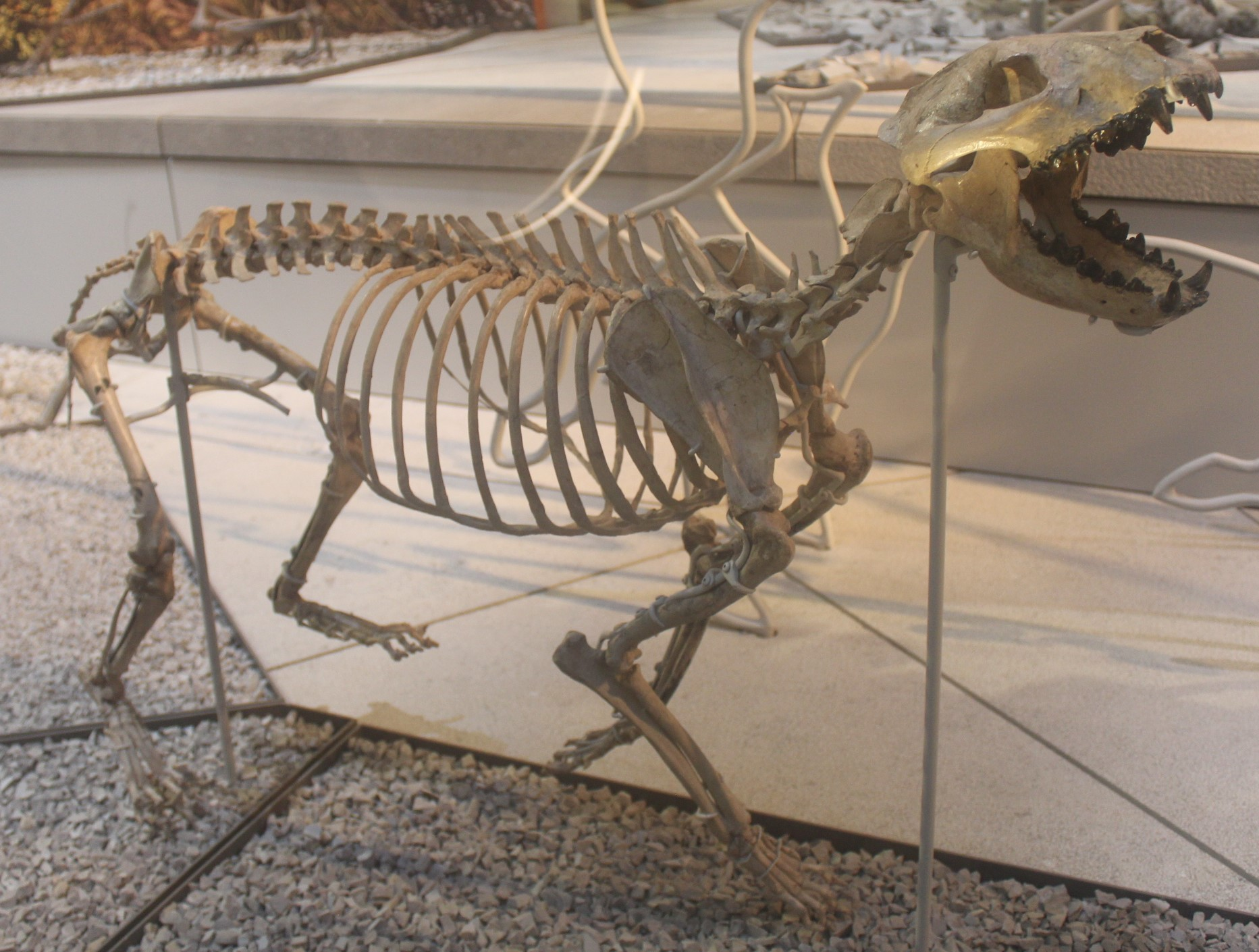
- A. stirtoni skeleton, National Museum of Natural History

Scientific classification
- Kingdom: Animalia
- Phylum: Chordata
- Class: Mammalia
- Order: Carnivora
- Family: Canidae
- Subfamily: †Borophaginae
- Tribe: †Borophagini
- Subtribe: †Aelurodontina
- Genus: †Aelurodon; Leidy, 1858

Type species
- †Aelurodon ferox

Species
- †A. asthenostylus; †A. ferox; †A. mcgrewi; †A. montanensis; †A. stirtoni; †A. taxoides

Synonyms
- Prohyaena Schlosser, 1890; Strobodon Webb, 1969

= Aelurodon =

Aelurodon Temporal range: Middle-Late Miocene (Barstovian-Hemphillian) ~15.97–5.3 Ma

Extinct genus of carnivores

Aelurodon is an extinct canid genus of the subfamily Borophaginae which lived from the Barstovian land mammal age (16 mya) of the middle Miocene to the late Miocene epoch (5.332 mya). Aelurodon existed for approximately 10.7 million years.

== Taxonomy ==
=== Classification ===
Aelurodon are a part of a clade of canids loosely known as "bone-crushing" or "hyena-like" dogs, that apparently descended from the earlier genera Protomarctus and Tomarctus. Several species are known from fossils found in the central and western U.S., suggesting a wide geographic range during their peak in the Miocene epoch.

=== Evolution ===
The earliest occurrence of the genus is A. asthenostylus dating from 16–14 Ma. This species then gives rise to two different anagenetic clades around 15 Ma. One comprises the species A. montaneis, A. mcgrewi and A. stirtoni, going extinct around 12 Ma. The other clade persists until 5.3 Ma and includes A. ferox and A. taxoides. A. taxoides is the most derived and largest species in Aelurodon.

The evolution of Aelurodon is characterized by the progressive development of teeth adapted to a more hypercarnivorous diet, a trend consistent with other borophagines.

== Description ==
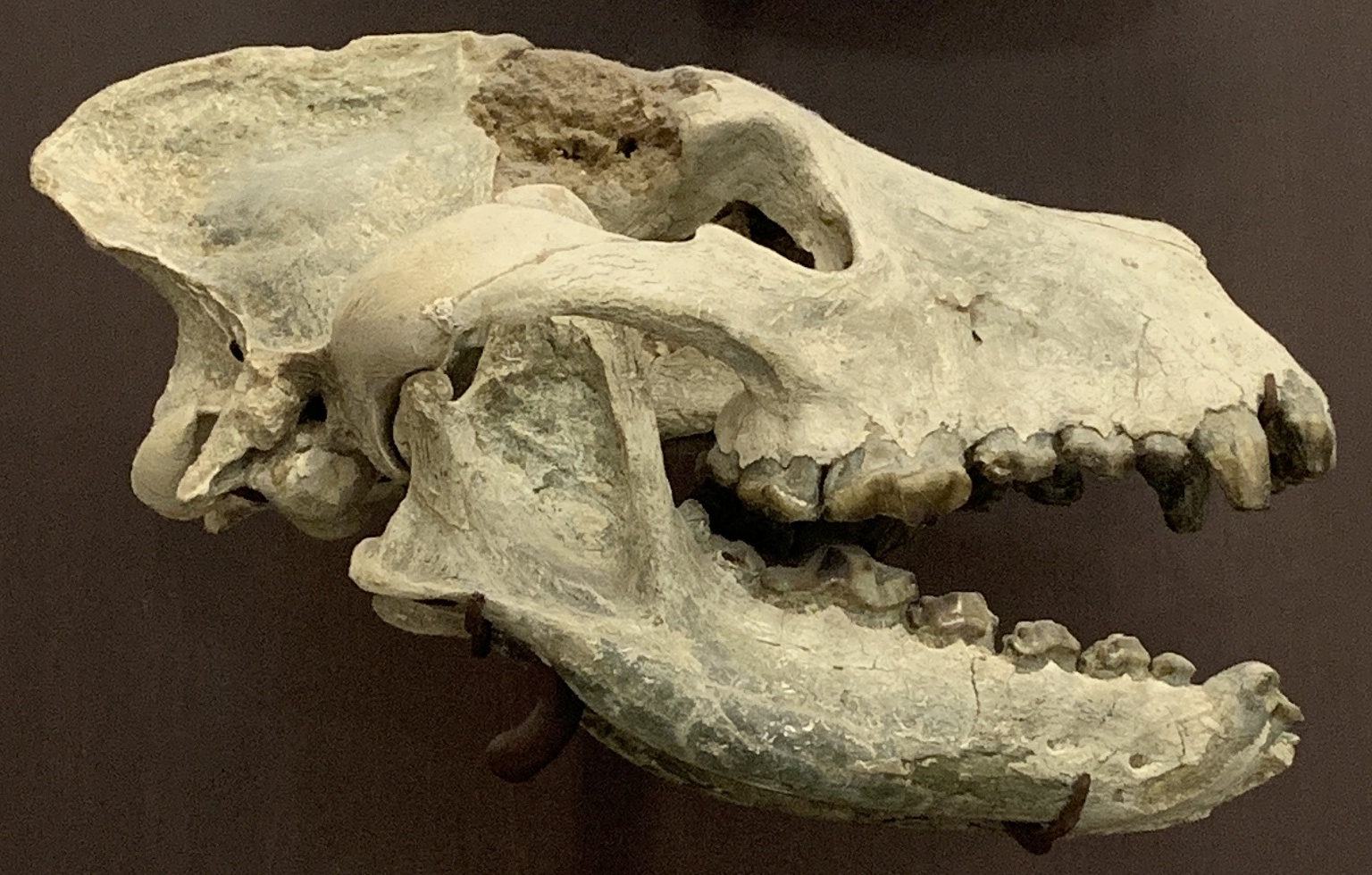
A. taxoides skull, American Museum of Natural History

A. taxoides was the largest species within the genus, Andersson (2005) estimated to have weighed 60 kg (130 lb) on average. Although geographically younger specimens in Nebraska may have shown evidence of a size reduction. A. ferox (the probable ancestor of A. taxoides) was much smaller, weighing 36 kg (79 lb).

== Paleobiology ==
=== Social behavior ===
The social behavior of Aelurodon and other borophagines has been debated by experts. Radinsky (1969) noted canids had a larger prorean gyrus than felids. Prorean gyrus consists of the prefrontal cortex, and may have been correlated pack social structures as larger canids had a relatively greater amount of prefrontal cortex and have highly developed social behaviors. Radinsky (1973) analyzed the endocast of borophagines and found an unexpanded prorean gyrus, which suggests borophagines didn’t form organized pack structures.

Munthe (1989) argues that Aelurodon would’ve been solitary, ambush predators because of their more flexible and robust forelimbs. This along with is grasping anterior teeth would’ve enabled it to pull down large prey on their own. Valkenburgh et al. (2003) criticized this argument. They argued while borophagines had more mobility in their forelimbs and forepaws than Caninae, they still lacked the sharp, curved, retractable claws seen in felids, this would’ve made it difficult for borophagines to hold onto large prey. They argued the larger species of Aelurodon (A. ferox and A. taxoides) were social predators due to their hypercarnivory and relative abundance in the fossil record.

However, Andersson (2005) called this argument into question as craniodental and elbow joint morphology of most large borophagines resembled that of pantherinae instead of recent canids. This suggests canines aren’t a suitable analogue for ecological and behaviorally morphology in borophagines. However, the existence of lions shows that carnivorans that can grapple are still capable of adopting pack hunting.

=== Predatory behavior ===
The hunting method of Aelurodon has been debated by experts. Muntune (1989) recovered Aelurodon as an ambush predator. However, Van Valkenburgh et al. (2003) suggested their running capabilities are difficult as spotted hyenas are pursuit predators despite limb proportions suggesting otherwise. They suggested that Aelurodon was capable of pursuing prey over a limited distance. Schwab et al. (2019) recovered Aelurodon as a pursuit predators based on the morphology of its bony labyrinth. However, Figueirido et al. (2015) recovered Aelurodon as an ambush predator, although one A. ferox specimen was recovered as a pounce predator. Their analysis also found that pursuit predation among canids emerged during the Pleistocene. ^{Including supplementary materials}

Martín-Serra et al. (2016) noted that based on the forelimb morphology, the predatory behavior of the borophagines was not equivalent to any living species as they weren’t as specialized for grappling as ambush predators or as cursorial as pounce-pursuit and pursuit predators.
