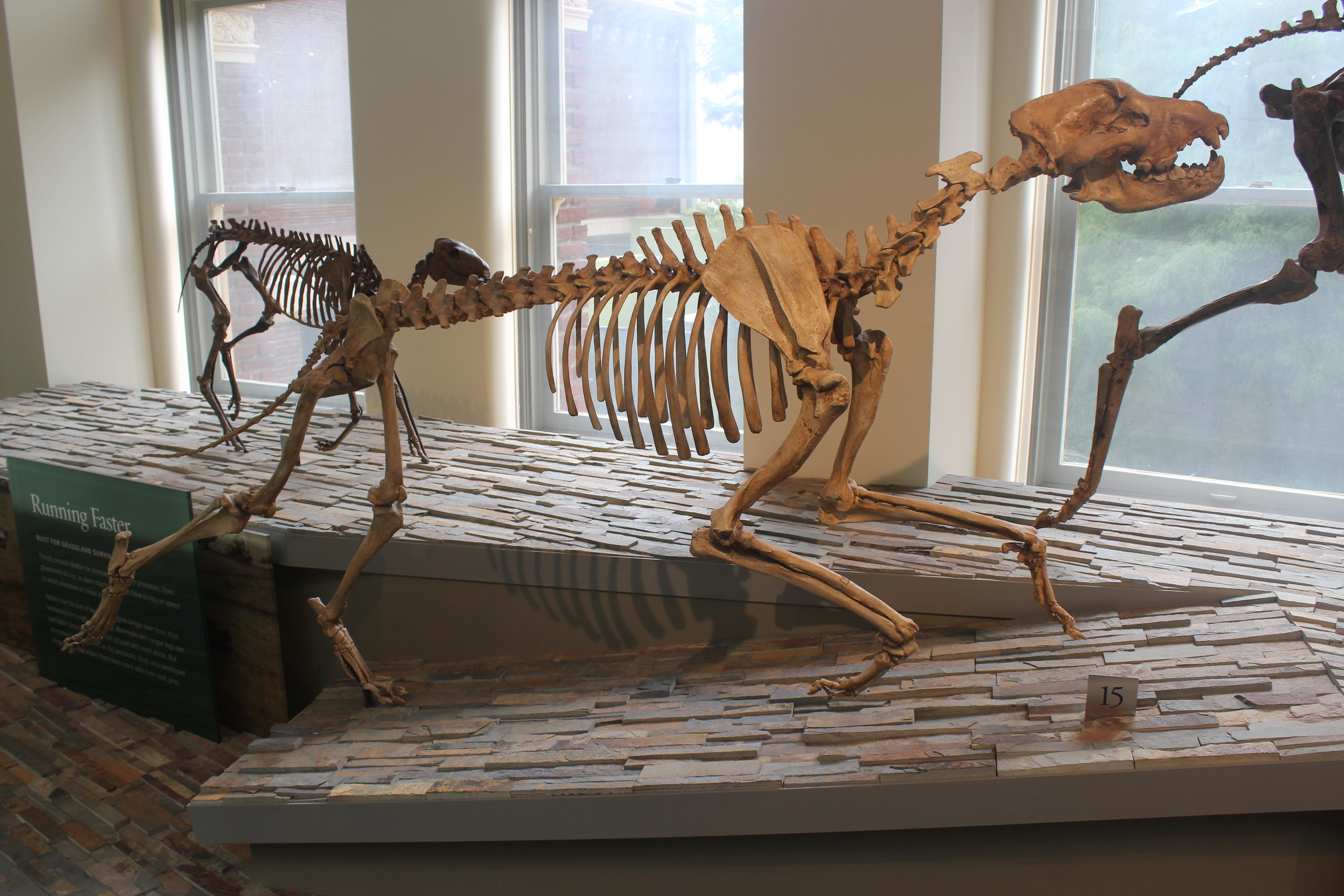
- Mounted E. haydeni skeleton

Scientific classification
- Kingdom: Animalia
- Phylum: Chordata
- Class: Mammalia
- Order: Carnivora
- Family: Canidae
- Subfamily: †Borophaginae
- Tribe: †Borophagini
- Subtribe: †Borophagina
- Genus: †Epicyon; Leidy, 1858

Type species
- †Epicyon haydeni Leidy, 1858

Other Species
- †E. aelurodontoides; †E. saevus

= Epicyon =

Epicyon Temporal range: Late Miocene to Early Pliocene (Clarendonian to Hemphillian), 12–5 Ma

Genus of carnivores

Epicyon ("more than a dog") is a large, extinct, canid genus of the subfamily Borophaginae ("bone-crushing dogs"), native to North America. Epicyon existed for about 7 million years from the early Clarendonian age of the Late Miocene to the late Hemphillian age of the Early Pliocene. E. haydeni is the largest known canid of all time, with the type species reaching 2.4 m (7.9 ft) in length, 90 cm (35 in) in shoulder height and approximately 100–125 kg (220–276 lb) in body mass. The largest known humerus specimen belonged to an individual weighing up to 170 kg (370 lb).

== Taxonomy ==
Epicyon was first named by Joseph Leidy in 1858 as a subgenus of Canis. It was also mentioned as belonging to the Aelurodontina by Matthew and Stirton in 1930. Later studies indicates that it was not a species of Canis, but a borophagine.

Epicyon haydeni, the type species, existed from 10-5 million years ago. It is synonymous with Aelurodon aphobus, Osteoborus ricardoensis, Osteoborus validus, and Tephrocyon mortifer, and was named by Joseph Leidy as a subgenus. It was recombined as Aelurodon haydeni by Scott and Osborn in 1890. Further study by Matthew in 1899, Matthew and Gidley in 1904, VanderHoof and Gregory in 1940, McGrew in 1944, Bennett in 1979, (1979) and Becker (1980). It again was recombined as Epicyon haydeni by Baskin in 1980, Voorhies in 1990, (1990), Baskin (1998), Wang et al. in 1999.

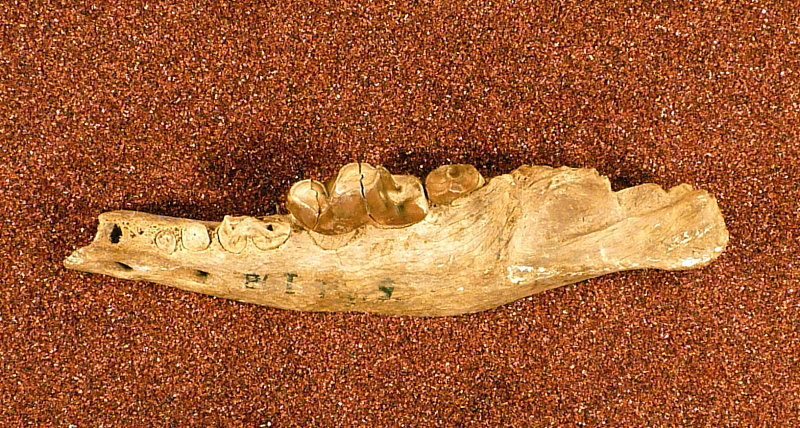
Mandible of E. saevus

E. saevus existed from 12 to 7 million years ago. It is synonymous with Aelurodon inflatus and was named by Joseph Leidy in 1858 or 1859. In the late 1880s-early 1900s, Scott, Matthew, Cope and Matthew, Troxell recombined the animal as Aelurodon saevus. It was recombined as Epicyon saevus by Baskin in 1980, Munthe in 1989, Voorhies in 1990, and Wang et al. 1999.

E. aelurodontoides existed from 9 to 7 million years ago and was named by X. Wang and others in 1999. This species was found south of the Young Brothers Ranch, Kansas.

== Description ==
Hypothetical life restoration of E. haydeni

Epicyon had a massive head and powerful jaws that were well adapted for bone-crushing, with enlarged fourth premolars like some hyenas, giving its skull a lion-like shape rather than having a skull similar in shape to that of a wolf; the adaptation would have allowed Epicyon to scavenge as well as hunt, giving it access to the nutritious marrow other contemporary carnivores could not access.

E. haydeni was the largest known species of canid; it is estimated to have had a body length of 2.4 m (7.9 ft), a shoulder height of 90 cm (35 in) and a body mass of approximately 100–125 kg (220–276 lb), with the largest known specimen weighing up to 170 kg (370 lb).

E. saevus is estimated to have a shoulder height is up to 56 cm (22 in) and body mass up to 66.5 kg (147 lb).

== Paleobiology ==
=== Predatory behavior ===
The molars of E. haydeni were grindstone-like teeth that allow for a canid diet that includes both meat and plant and insects. The proportional size of an animal's molars is a great measure of the nutritional diversity of its diet. Based on fossilized feces and its robust teeth and jaw muscles it is believed to have consumed large amounts of bone and share a similar digestive tract to modern day hyenas due to their ability to break down bones. The deadly bite of a E. haydeni was delivered by the canine teeth, which are placed near the front of the upper and lower jaws, the shortening of the jaws can be an effective method for getting the canines closer to the mandibular condyle, thereby increasing the biting force.

The small clavicle, flexible back, and digitigrade posture of E. haydeni are all postcranial features shared with other canids and are likely adaptations designed to increase the animal's stride length. Examinations of the limb proportions and toughness of the skeleton suggests that E. haydeni was less cursorial than hyenas or modern wolves but more cursorial than other borophagine species like Aelurodon. Unlike hyenas, E. haydeni must have used their rearmost lower premolar (p4) and upper carnassial (P4) to crack large bones. Smaller bones and bone fragments were likely crushed with the carnassials and post-carnassial molars just as in extant canids. Due to its larger size and less gracile skeleton, E. haydeni was less cursorial and unable to run as long a distance as E. saevus, instead it relied on bursts of speed.

Predatory behavior for Epicyon heavily depends on the methods used. Schwab et al. (2019) found E. haydeni likely practiced pounce predation based on the anatomy of its bony labyrinth, while Figueirido et al. (2015) analysis on elbow morphology suggests E. haydeni was more of an ambush hunter. On the other hand, Martín-Serra et al. (2016) found E. haydeni practiced pursuit or pounce-pursuit predation, while E. saevus practiced pounce-pursuit predation based on forelimb analysis. Their analysis also suggests borophagines predatory behavior was not equivalent to any living species.

=== Social behavior ===
Whether or not Epicyon was a pack or solitary hunter is unclear. Radinsky (1969) noted canids had a larger prorean gyrus than felids. Prorean gyrus is comprised of the prefrontal cortex, and may have been correlated pack social structures as larger canids had a relatively greater amount of prefrontal cortex and have highly developed social behaviors. Radinsky (1973) analyzed the endocast of borophagines and found an unexpanded prorean gyrus, which suggests borophagines didn’t form organized pack structures.

Munthe (1989) found that the versatility of the forelimbs in Epicyon was more limited compared to Aelurodon, which suggests Epicyon may have been gregarious. However, she considered it to have been a solitary-social hunter, only engaging with cooperative hunting occasionally. Tomida et al. (1998) believed E. haydeni was a pack hunter as it was very prevalent in the fossil record, and was one of the most common carnivores in North America at the time. Valkenburgh et al. (2003) also argued pack hunting as canids can’t bring down large prey without hunting in packs as their forelimbs are incapable of grappling prey. They considered both species of Epicyon to have been social hunters due to their hypercarnivory adaptations and abundance in the fossil record.

Andersson (2005) called their interpretation into question as craniodental and elbow joint morphology of borophagines resembled that of pantherines instead of recent canines. This would make the latter unsuitable analogy for the ecological behavior of borophagines. The author of the paper admitted that this is not enough to refute or support pack hunting among borophaginae as lions are capable of grappling prey, but they still hunt in social groups, showing the complexity of social behavior in carnivorans.

== Paleoecology ==
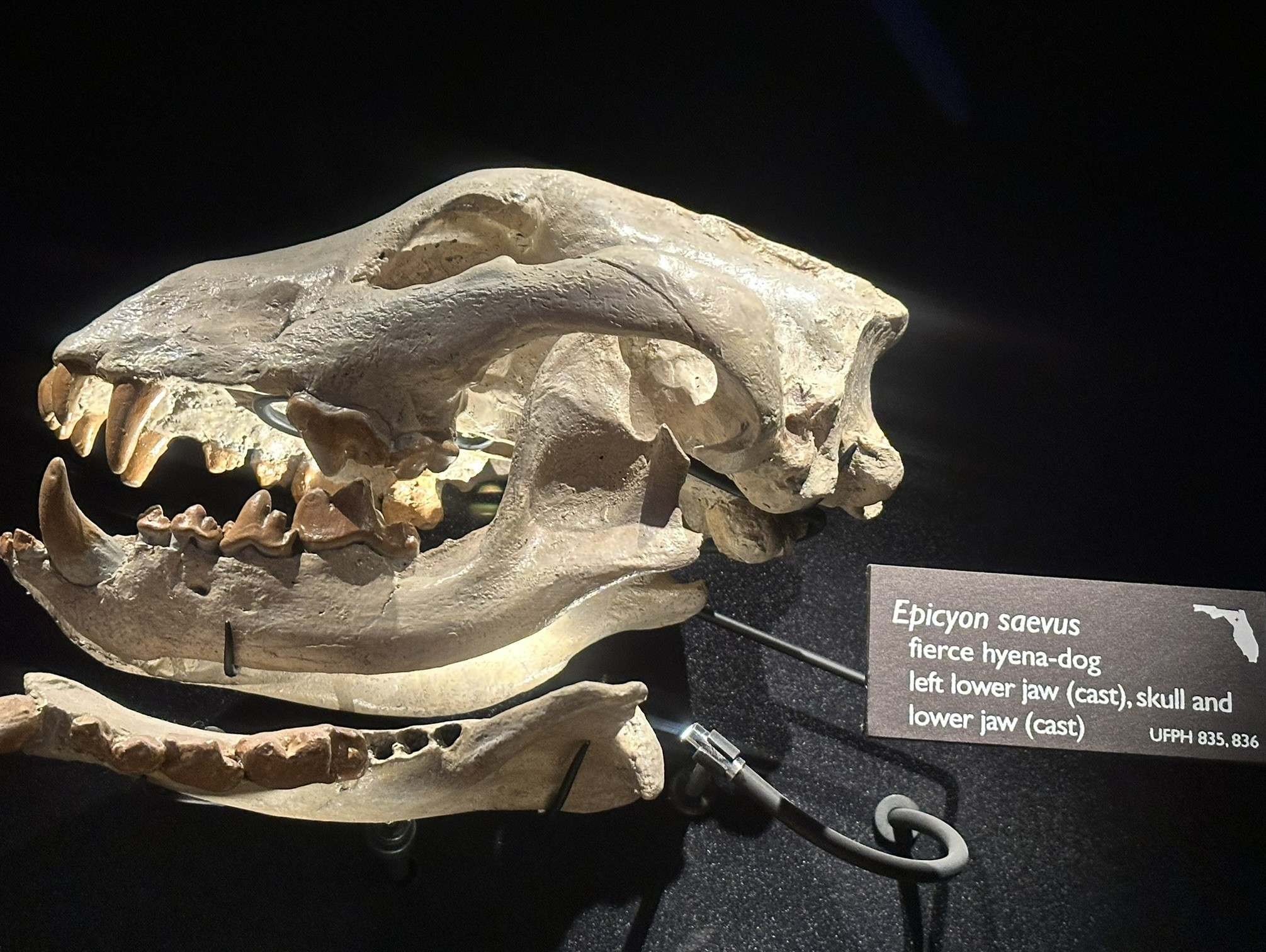
Skull and mandible casts of E. saevus, Florida Museum of Natural History

Fossil specimens range from Florida to California and have been found in Nebraska, Montana, Kansas, Texas, New Mexico, Colorado, Oklahoma, Idaho, Oregon, Arizona within the United States, as well as in Alberta, Canada.

In Coffee Ranch in Texas, Epicyon shared territory with the bear Huracan, machairodont feline Amphimachairodus coloradensis, and fellow canid Borophagus. All of these animals were potential competitors that would have occasionally conflicted with Epicyon for food and territory. Prey for Epicyon included herbivores such as the camel Aepycamelus, the pronghorn Cosoryx, horses such as Neohipparion and Nannippus, the peccary Prosthennops, and the rhinoceroses such as Teleoceras, all of which could provide a suitable meal through hunting or scavenging.

Epicyon was also found in Love Bone Beds deposits (of Clarendonian Age). This locality had a mixture of grassland, riverine forest, and marshes, in which Epicyon would have shared territory with herbivorous animals include rhinoceroses like Teleoceras and Aphelops, the protoceratid Synthetoceras, the camel Aepycamelus, horses like Neohipparion and Nannippus, the proboscidean Gomphotherium, and carnivores like the nimravid Barbourofelis, the machairodont Nimravides, borophaginae canid Borophagus, and mustelids Leptarctus and Sthenictis.

Epicyon was one of the last of the borophagines, and shared its North American habitat with several other canids, including:

- Borophagus 23.3 to 3.6 million years ago (Mya)
- Carpocyon from 20.4 to 3.9 Mya
- Paratomarctus from 16.3 to 5.3 Mya
- Aelurodon from 16.0 to 5.3 Mya
- Canis lepophagus from 10.3 to 3.6 Mya

== Extinction ==
Borophagines experienced an increase in extinction rates around 15 Ma, which may have been the result of increased body size. Following the Middle Miocene Climatic Optimum, the global temperature declined, which produced less suitable habitats for later borophagines lineages, as they had limited adaptations for running. Munthe (1989) noted the extinction of E. haydeni coincided with the Great Plains shifting to a steppe environment. Other contributing factors include the inability to capture ungulates in open environments, the inability to form packs, competition with more cursorial predators, and competition with Huracan and felids.

== General references ==
- Xiaoming Wang, Richard H. Tedford, Mauricio Antón, Dogs: Their Fossil Relatives and Evolutionary History, New York : Columbia University Press, 2008; ISBN 978-0-231-13528-3
