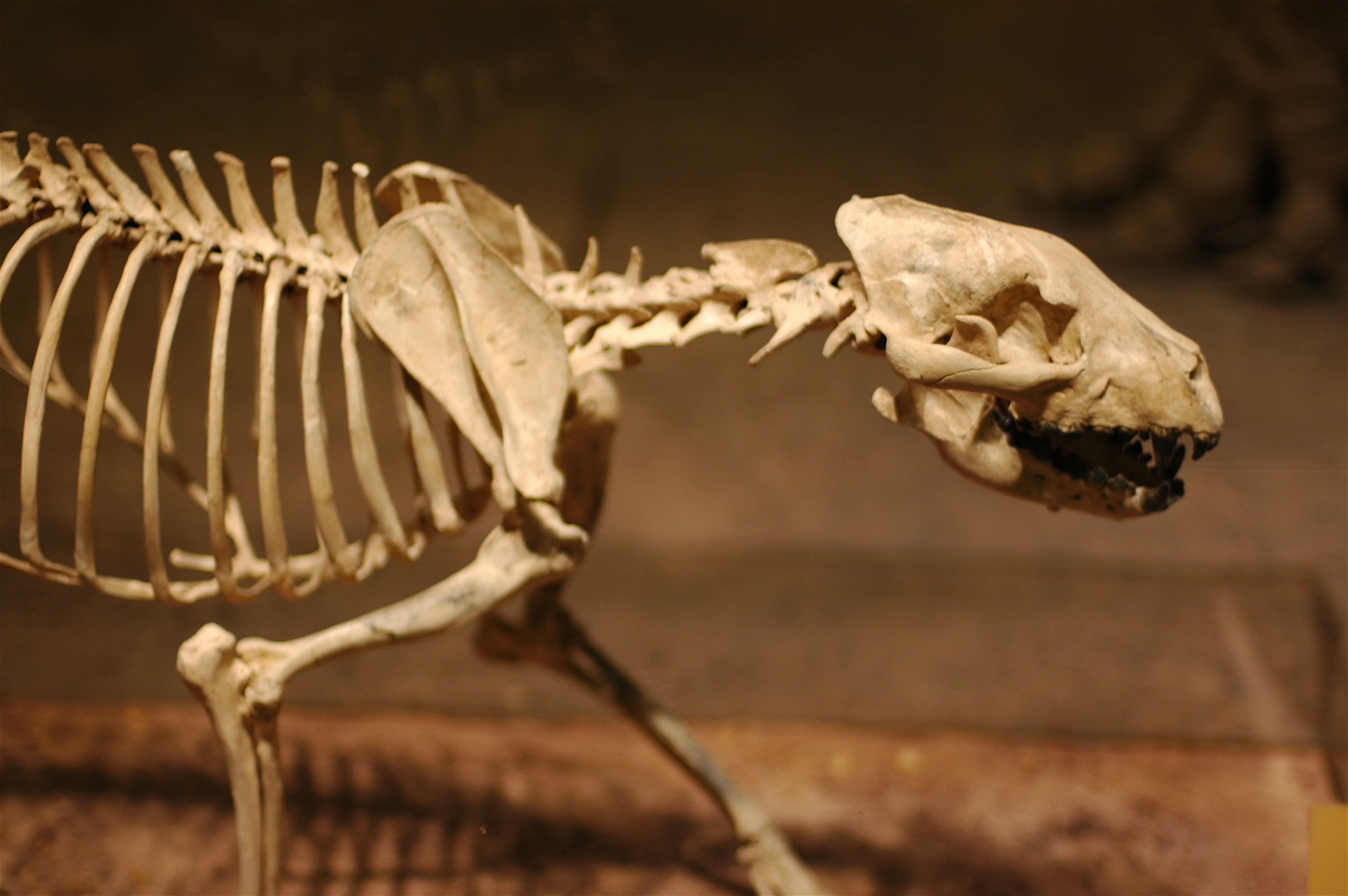
- Aelurodon stirtoni

Scientific classification
- Kingdom: Animalia
- Phylum: Chordata
- Class: Mammalia
- Order: Carnivora
- Family: Canidae
- Subfamily: †Borophaginae; Simpson (1945)

Genera
- †Archaeocyon; †Oxetocyon; †Otarocyon; †Rhizocyon; †Borophagini; †Phlaocyonini

= Borophaginae =

Borophagines Temporal range: 34–2.5 Ma Oligocene-Earliest Pleistocene

Extinct subfamily of carnivores

The extinct Borophaginae form one of three subfamilies found within the canid family. The other two canid subfamilies are the extinct Hesperocyoninae and extant Caninae. Borophaginae, called "bone-crushing dogs", were endemic to North America during the Oligocene to Pliocene and lived roughly 34–2.5 million years ago, existing for about 31.5 million years.

== Origin ==
Canid subfamilies

- Canidae
  - †Hesperocyoninae
  - - †Borophaginae
    - Caninae

The Borophaginae descended from the subfamily Hesperocyoninae. The earliest and most primitive borophagine is the genus Archaeocyon, which is a small fox-sized animal mostly found in the fossil beds in western North America. The borophagines soon diversified into several major groups. They evolved to become considerably larger than their predecessors, and filled a wide range of niches in late Cenozoic North America, from small omnivores to powerful, bear-sized carnivores, such as Epicyon.

== Species ==
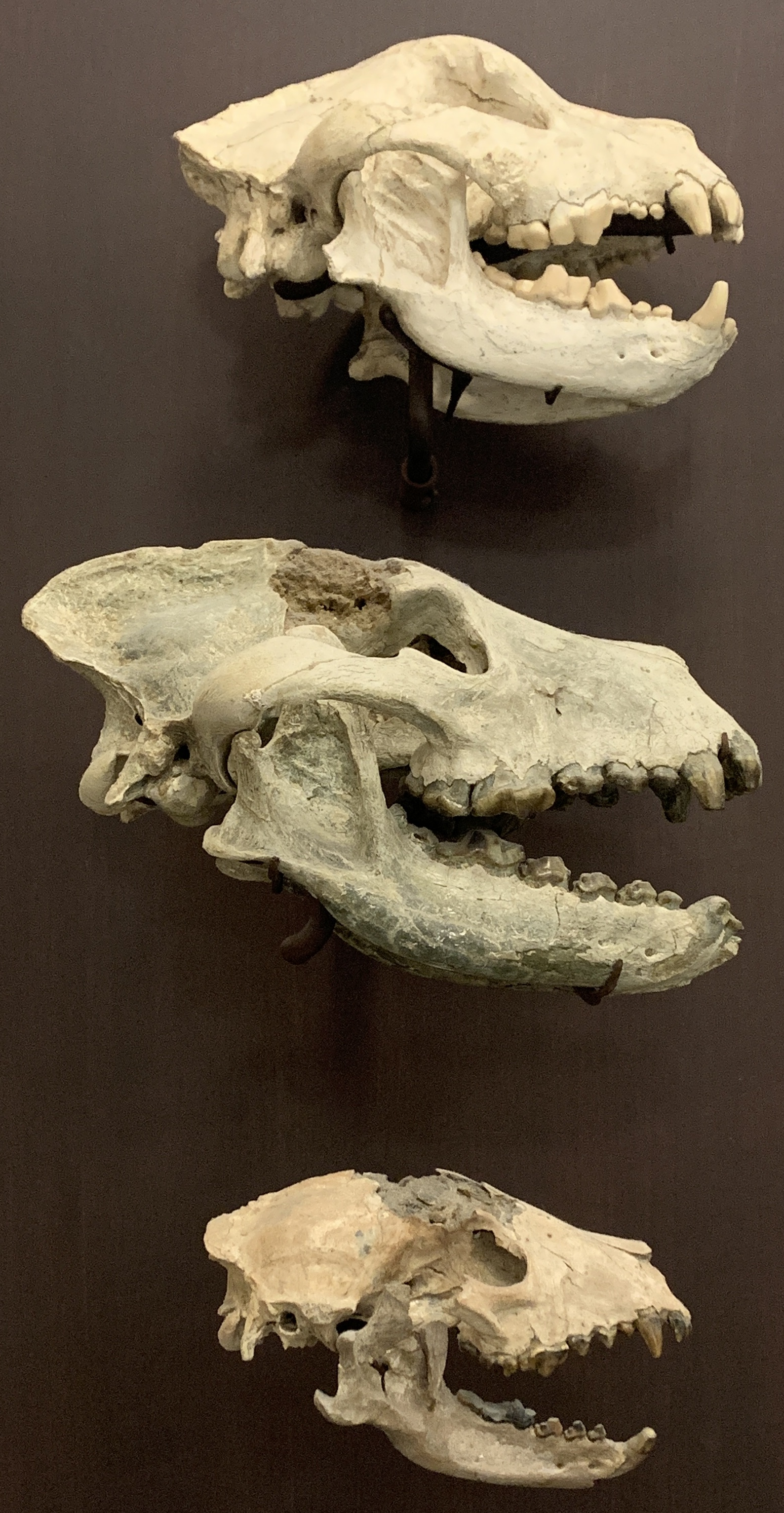
Borophagus secundus (top), Aelurodon taxoides (middle), Tomarctus brevirostris (bottom).

There are 66 identified borophagine species, including 18 newly identified species that range from the Orellan to Blancan ages. A phylogenetic analysis of the species was conducted using cladistic methods, with Hesperocyoninae as an archaic group of canids, as the outgroup. Aside from some transitional forms, Borophaginae can be organized into four major clades: Phlaocyonini, Cynarctina, Aelurodontina, and Borophagina (all erected as new tribes or subtribes). The Borophaginae begins with a group of small fox-sized genera, such as Archaeocyon, Oxetocyon, Otarocyon, and Rhizocyon, in the Orellan through early Arikareean stages. These canids reached their maximum diversity of species around 28 million years ago.

Often generically referred to as "bone-crushing dogs" for their powerful teeth and jaws, and hyena-like features (although their dentition was more primitive than that of hyenas), their fossils are abundant and widespread; in all likelihood, they were probably one of the top predators of their ecosystems. Their good fossil record has also allowed a detailed reconstruction of their phylogeny, showing that the group was highly diverse in its heyday. All Borophaginae had a small fifth toe on their rear feet (similar to the toes that bear dew claws on the front feet), where as all modern Caninae have only four toes normally.

Noteworthy genera in this group are Aelurodon, Epicyon, and Borophagus (=Osteoborus). According to Xiaoming Wang, the Borophaginae played broad ecological roles that are performed by at least three living carnivoran families, Canidae (which they were a part of), Hyaenidae, and Procyonidae.

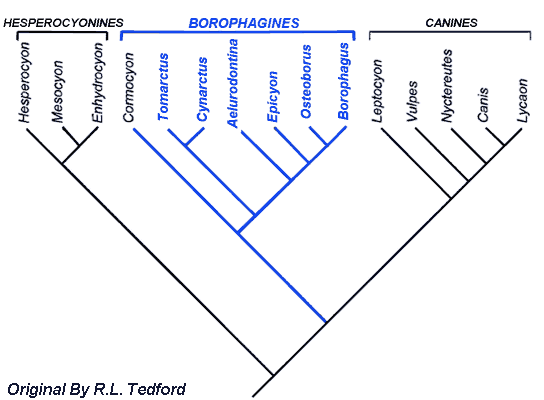
Phylogeny of borophagines by R.L. Tedford, 1977

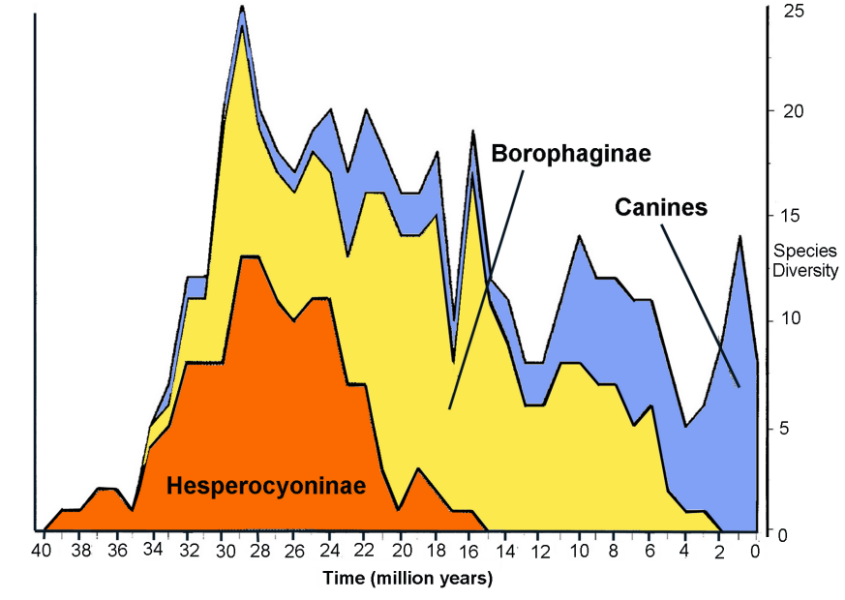
Fluctuation of species within Canidae over 40 million years

== Classification ==
Borophagine taxonomy, following Wang et al. (million years=in existence)

- Family Canidae
  - Subfamily †Borophaginae
    - †Archaeocyon 33—26 Ma, existing 7 million years
    - †Oxetocyon 33—28 Ma, existing 4 million years
    - †Otarocyon 34—30 Ma, existing 4 million years
    - †Rhizocyon 33—26 Ma, existing 4 million years
    - Tribe †Phlaocyonini 33—13 Ma, existing 20 million years
      - †Cynarctoides 30—18 Ma, existing 12 million years
      - †Phlaocyon 30—19 Ma,11 million years
    - Tribe †Borophagini 30—3 Ma, existing 27 million years
      - †Cormocyon 30—20 Ma, existing 10 million years
      - †Desmocyon 25—16 Ma, existing 9 million years
      - †Metatomarctus 19—16 Ma, existing 3 million years
      - †Euoplocyon 18—16 Ma, existing 2 million years
      - †Psalidocyon 16—13 Ma, existing 7 million years
      - †Microtomarctus 21—13 Ma, existing 7 million years
      - †Protomarctus 20—16 Ma, existing 4 million years
      - †Tephrocyon 16—14 Ma, existing 2.7 million years
      - Subtribe †Cynarctina 20—10 Ma, existing 10 million years
        - †Paracynarctus 19—16 Ma, existing 3 million years
        - †Cynarctus 16—12 Ma, existing 4 million years
      - Subtribe †Aelurodontina 20—5 Ma, existing 15 million years
        - †Tomarctus 23—16 Ma, existing 7 million years
        - †Aelurodon 16—12 Ma, existing 4 million years
      - Subtribe †Borophagina
        - †Paratomarctus 16—5 Ma, existing 11 million years
        - †Carpocyon 16—5 Ma, existing 11 million years
        - †Protepicyon 16—12 Ma, existing 2.7 million years
        - †Epicyon 12—10 Ma, existing 2 million years
        - †Borophagus (=Osteoborus) 12—5 Ma, existing 7 million years

Cladogram showing borophagine interrelationships, following Wang et al., figure 141:

- Canidae
  - Hesperocyoninae
  - - Caninae
    - Borophaginae
      - Archaeocyon
      - Oxetocyon
      - Otarocyon
      - - Rhizocyon
        - - Phlaocyonini
            - Cynarctoides
            - Phlaocyon
          - Borophagini
            - Cormocyon
            - - Desmocyon
              - - Cynarctina
                  - Paracynarctus
                  - Cynarctus
                - - Metatomarctus
                  - - Euoplocyon
                    - - Psalidocyon
                      - - Microtomarctus
                        - - Protomarctus
                          - - Tephrocyon
                            - Aelurodontina
                              - Tomarctus
                              - Aelurodon
                            - Borophagina
                              - Paratomarctus
                              - - Carpocyon
                                - - Protepicyon
                                  - - Epicyon
                                    - Borophagus

== Extinction ==
According to an analysis of the fossil record of North American fossil carnivorans, the decline of borophagines from a diversity of about 30 species 15 million years ago to extinction was largely driven by competition with felids and canines. Felids invaded the continent from Eurasia about 20 million years ago and were better ambush predators, in part due to their retractable claws. Climate change, which led to the replacement of North American forests with grasslands, may also have been a factor; borophagines were less suited to running down prey than canines. Although these specific species developed powerful limbs that are capable of cracking bones in vicious pounce attacks, other carnivorous species that rely on quick ambush for catching prey were likely more successful than the slower Borophaginae.
