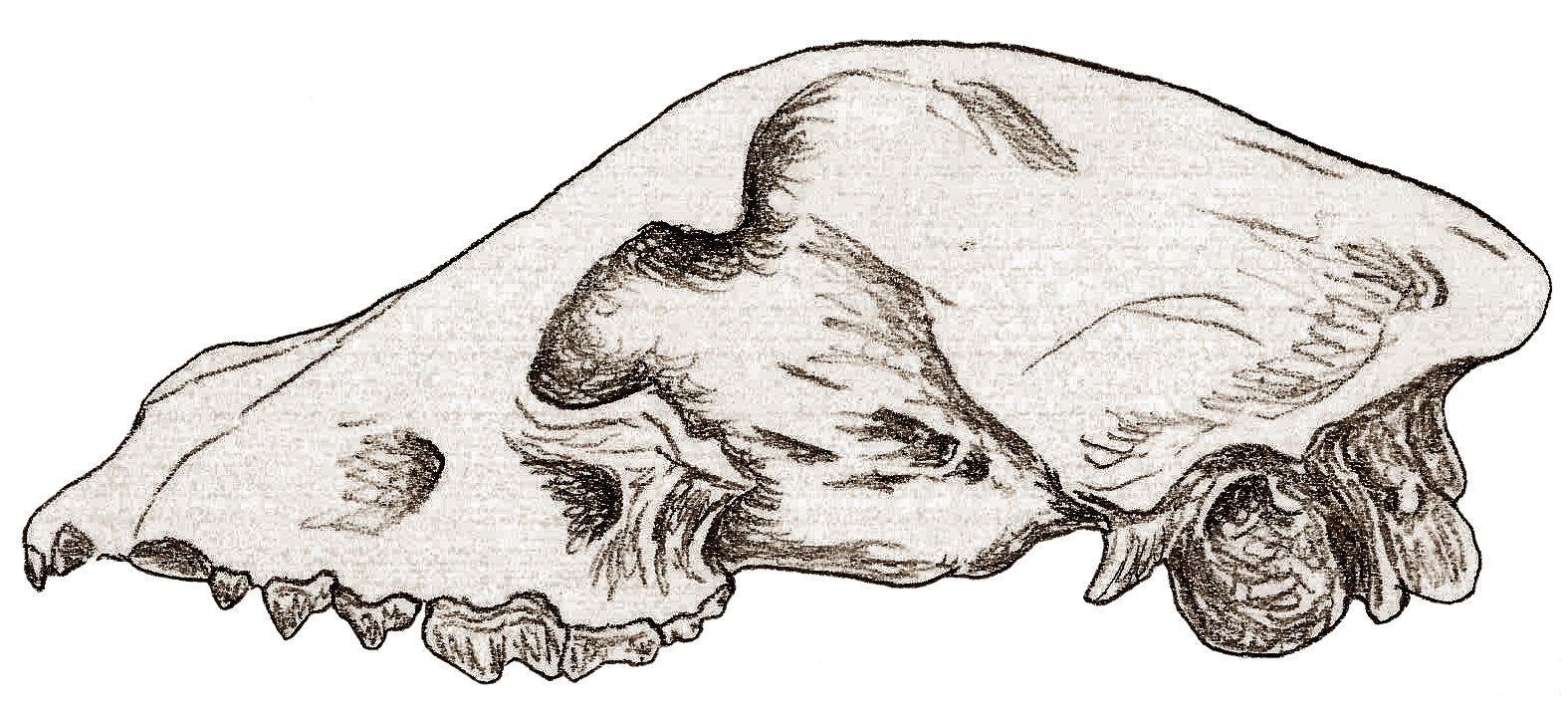

Scientific classification
- Domain: Eukaryota
- Kingdom: Animalia
- Phylum: Chordata
- Class: Mammalia
- Order: Carnivora
- Family: Canidae
- Subfamily: †Borophaginae
- Tribe: †Borophagini
- Subtribe: †Borophagina
- Genus: †Carpocyon; Webb, 1969

Type species
- †Carpocyon limosus Webb, 1969
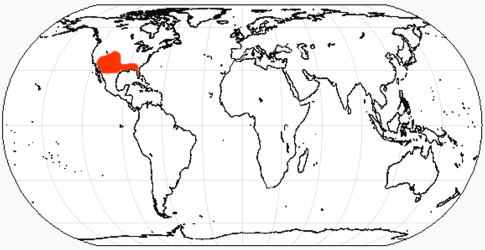
- Range of Carpocyon based on fossil distribution

= Carpocyon =

Carpocyon Temporal range: Middle Miocene–Late Miocene

Extinct genus of carnivores

Carpocyon is an extinct genus of the Borophaginae subfamily of canids native to North America. It lived from the Middle to the Late Miocene, 13.6 to 5.3 Ma Mya, existing for approximately 16.5 million years. The four species in the genus varied in size, with the largest (C. webbi) being about the size of a wolf; all had relatively small teeth, suggesting a diet that was more omnivorous than that of other contemporary borophagines.

== Species ==
- Carpocyon compressus (syn. Cynodesmus cuspidatus), fossils have been found in Nevada, Nebraska, Colorado, and Kansas.
- Carpocyon limosus, fossils have been found in Nebraska, Oklahoma, and Florida.
- Carpocyon robustus, fossils have been found in Arizona, California, Colorado, South Dakota, and Texas.
- Carpocyon webbi, fossils have been found in Nebraska and New Mexico.
