= Xiaoming Wang (paleontologist) =

American vertebrate paleontologist and geologist

- Born: July 14, 1957 (age 69); China
- Education: Nanjing University; University of Kansas
- Scientific career
- Fields: Paleontology; Geology
- Workplaces: Long Island University

Xiaoming Wang is a Chinese-born American vertebrate paleontologist and geologist who lives and teaches in the United States.

== Areas of expertise ==
Professor Wang specializes in the fossil evolution, systematics, and phylogeny of mammals of the Cenozoic. He has researched the biostratigraphy of Inner Mongolia and Asia as a whole, the geochronology of Asia, paleoenvironments of the Tibetan Plateau, and mammalian migrations between Eurasia and North America. Wang has also investigated the systematics and phylogeny of canids (dogs and their kin) as well as Late Eocene through Pleistocene fossil mammals of Southern California and Mexico. (see Natural History Museum of LA).

== Education ==
- B.S. Nanjing University, Nanjing, Jiangsu province, PRC.
- Chinese Academy of Sciences, Institute of Vertebrate Paleontology and Paleoanthropology in Beijing, PRC.
- M.A. and Ph.D., University of Kansas, Lawrence, Kansas, United States.
- Post-doctoral work, American Museum of Natural History.
- Assistant Professor, Long Island University, New York.

== Professional life ==
Wang is a curator in the Department of Vertebrate Paleontology at the Natural History Museum of Los Angeles County and Natural History Museum. Wang is also a contributing researcher of the Paleobiology Database created by John Alroy, Ph.D.

Below is a list of taxa that Wang has contributed to naming:

Year	Taxon	Authors
2024	Shansictis xinzhouensis gen. et sp. nov.	Jiangzuo, Wang, Law, Su, Jia, Li, Fu, Kuang, Cao, Zou, Hou, Wang, Deng, & Ji
2023	Gazellospira tsaparangensis sp. nov.	Wang, Li, & Tseng
2022	Sonitictis moralesi gen. et sp. nov.	Wang, Tseng, Jiangzuo, Wang, & Wang
2020	Oriensmilus liupanensis gen. et sp. nov.	Wang, White, & Guan
2020	Tungurictis peignei sp. nov.	Wang, Tseng, Wu, Ye, Meng, & Bi
2016	Protovis himalayensis gen. et sp. nov.	Wang, Li, & Takeuchi
2014	Vulpes qiuzhudingi sp. nov.	Wang, Tseng, Li, Takeuchi, & Xie
2014	Buisnictis metabatos sp. nov.	Wang, Carranza-Castañeda, & Aranda-Gómez
2013	Chasmaporthetes gangsriensis sp. nov.	Tseng, Li, & Wang
2008	Hsianwenia wui gen. et sp. nov.	Chang, Wang, Liu, Miao, Zhao, Wu, Liu, Li, Sun, & Wang
2005	Martinogale faulli sp. nov.	Wang, Whistler, & Takeuchi
2004	Promephitis parvus sp. nov.	Wang & Qiu
2004	Promephitis qinensis sp. nov.	Wang & Qiu
2004	Aelurodon montanensis sp. nov.	Wang, Wideman, Nichols, & Hanneman

== Research ==
- The Origin and Evolution of the Dog Family
  - Hesperocyoninae, Borophaginae.
- Other Families of Carnivora.
- Paleoenvironment of the Tibetan Plateau.
- Biostratigraphy of Inner Mongolia.
- Neogene Terrestrial Mammalian Biostratigraphy and Chronology in Asia.

== Grants ==
U.S. National Science Foundation, National Natural Science Foundation of China, Chinese Academy of Sciences, and the U.S. National Geographic Society.

== Publications ==
- Society of Vertebrate Paleontology

Wang is also co-author, with American Museum of Natural History paleontologist, Richard H. Tedford of a popular book Dogs: Their Fossil Relatives and Evolutionary History, based upon their research on fossils of the Canidae.
