= List of the Cenozoic life of South Dakota =

This list of the Cenozoic life of South Dakota contains the various prehistoric life-forms whose fossilized remains have been reported from within the US state of South Dakota and are between 66 million and 10,000 years of age.

== A ==
- †Adeloblarina
  - †Adeloblarina berklandi – or unidentified comparable form
- †Adjidaumo
  - †Adjidaumo lophatus
  - †Adjidaumo minutus
- †Aelurodon
  - †Aelurodon ferox
  - †Aelurodon taxoides
- †Aepinacodon
  - †Aepinacodon deflectus – type locality for species
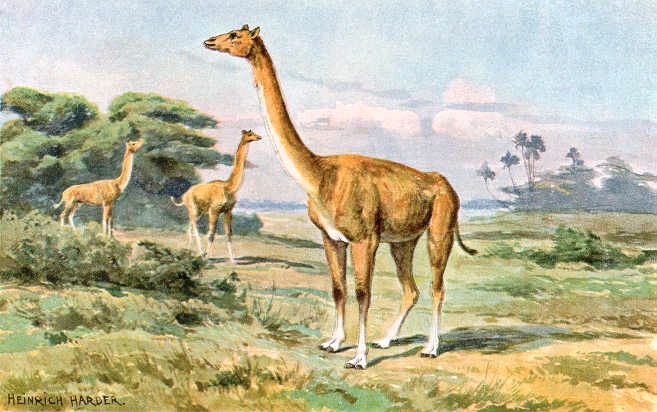
- Life restoration of the Miocene camel Aepycamelus, or the long-necked camel. Heinrich Harder (1920).
  †Aepycamelus
- †Agnotocastor
  - †Agnotocastor coloradensis
  - †Agnotocastor praetereadens – type locality for species
- †Agriochoerus
  - †Agriochoerus antiquus
  - †Agriochoerus gaudryi – type locality for species
- †Alilepus – tentative report
- †Alismaphyllites
  - †Alismaphyllites grandifolius
- †Allantodiopsis
  - †Allantodiopsis erosa
- Alligator
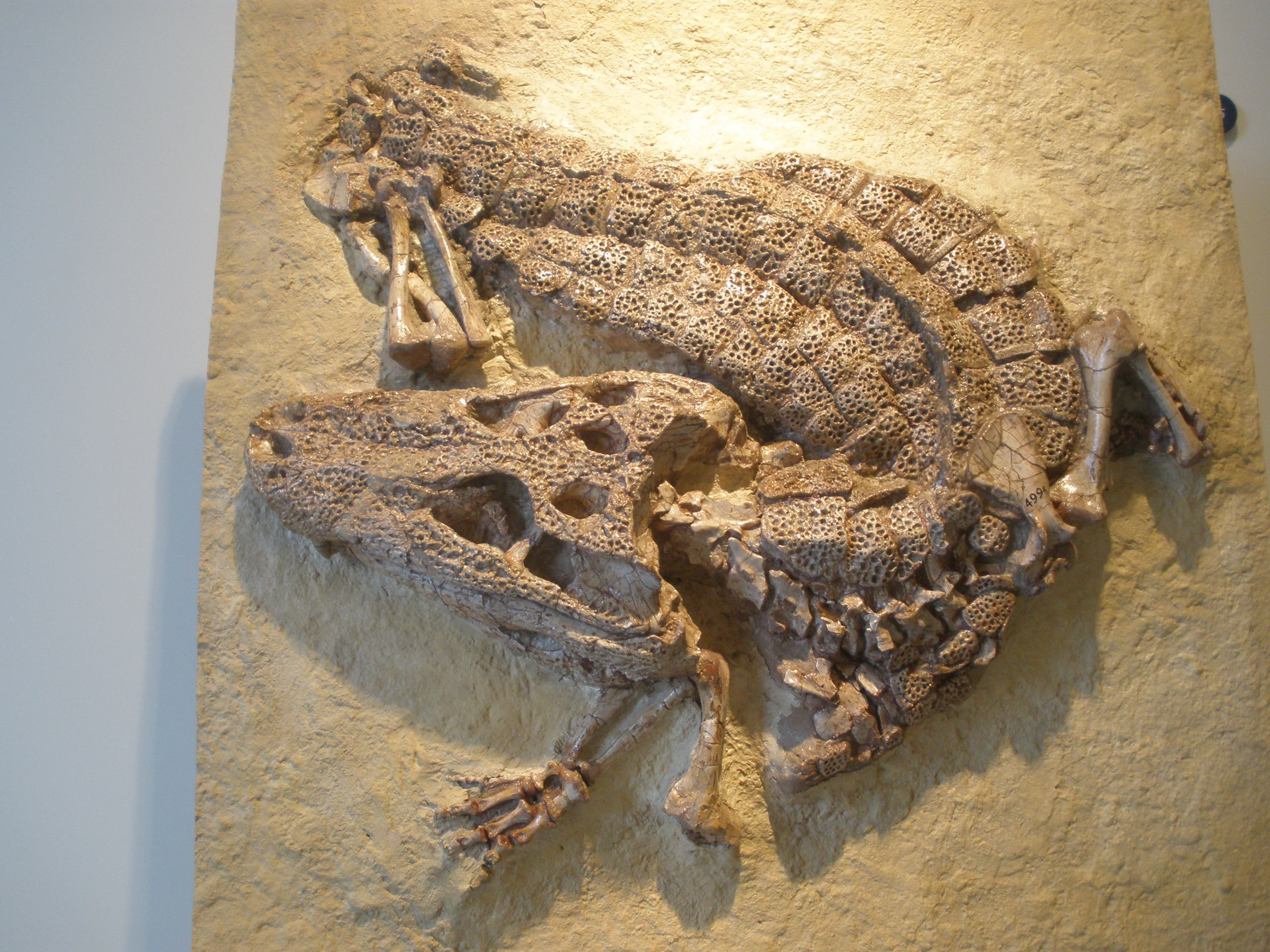
  - Fossilized skeleton of the Oligocene Alligator prenasalis
    †Alligator prenasalis – type locality for species
- †Allomys
  - †Allomys harkseni
  - †Allomys storeri – type locality for species
- †Allophaiomys
  - †Allophaiomys pliocaenicus
- †Alwoodia
- †Ambystoma
  - †Ambystoma minshalli
  - †Ambystoma tigrinum
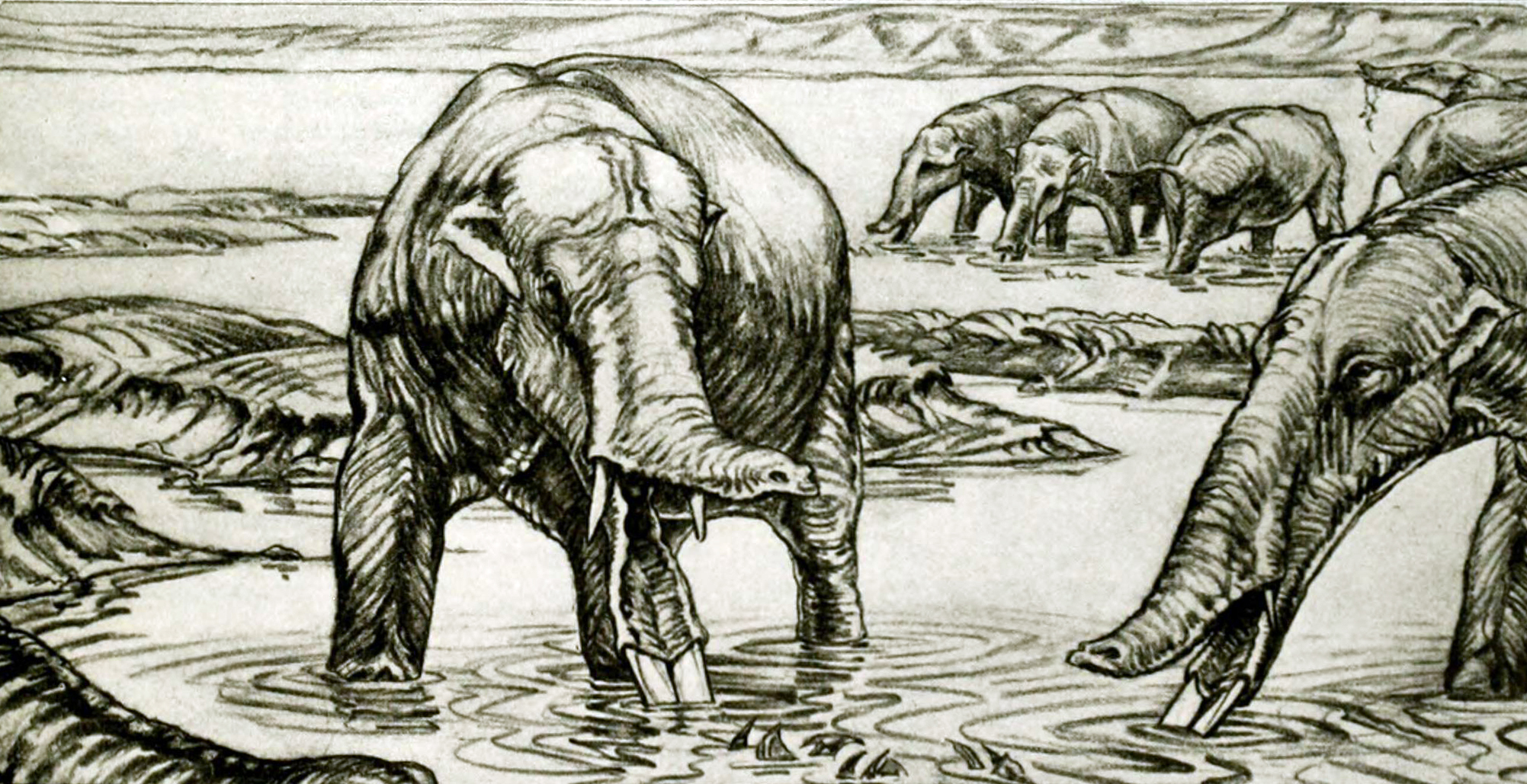
- Life restoration of the Miocene elephant relative Amebelodon. Margret Flinsch (1932).
  †Amebelodon
- †Ameiseophis
  - †Ameiseophis robinsoni
- †Ampelopsis
  - †Ampelopsis acerifolia
- †Amphechinus
  - †Amphechinus horncloudi
- †Amphicaenopus
  - †Amphicaenopus platycephalus – type locality for species
- †Amynodontopsis
  - †Amynodontopsis bodei
- †Anchitherium
  - †Anchitherium clarencei
- †Ansomys
  - †Ansomys cyanotephrus – type locality for species
- Antilocapra
  - †Antilocapra americana
- Apalone
  - †Apalone leucopotamica
- †Aphelops
  - †Aphelops megalodus
- †Apternodus
  - †Apternodus mediaevus
- †Archaeocyon
  - †Archaeocyon leptodus
  - †Archaeocyon pavidus
- †Archaeohippus
  - †Archaeohippus blackbergi – or unidentified comparable form
- †Archaeolagus
  - †Archaeolagus macrocephalus – type locality for species
  - †Archaeolagus primigenius – type locality for species
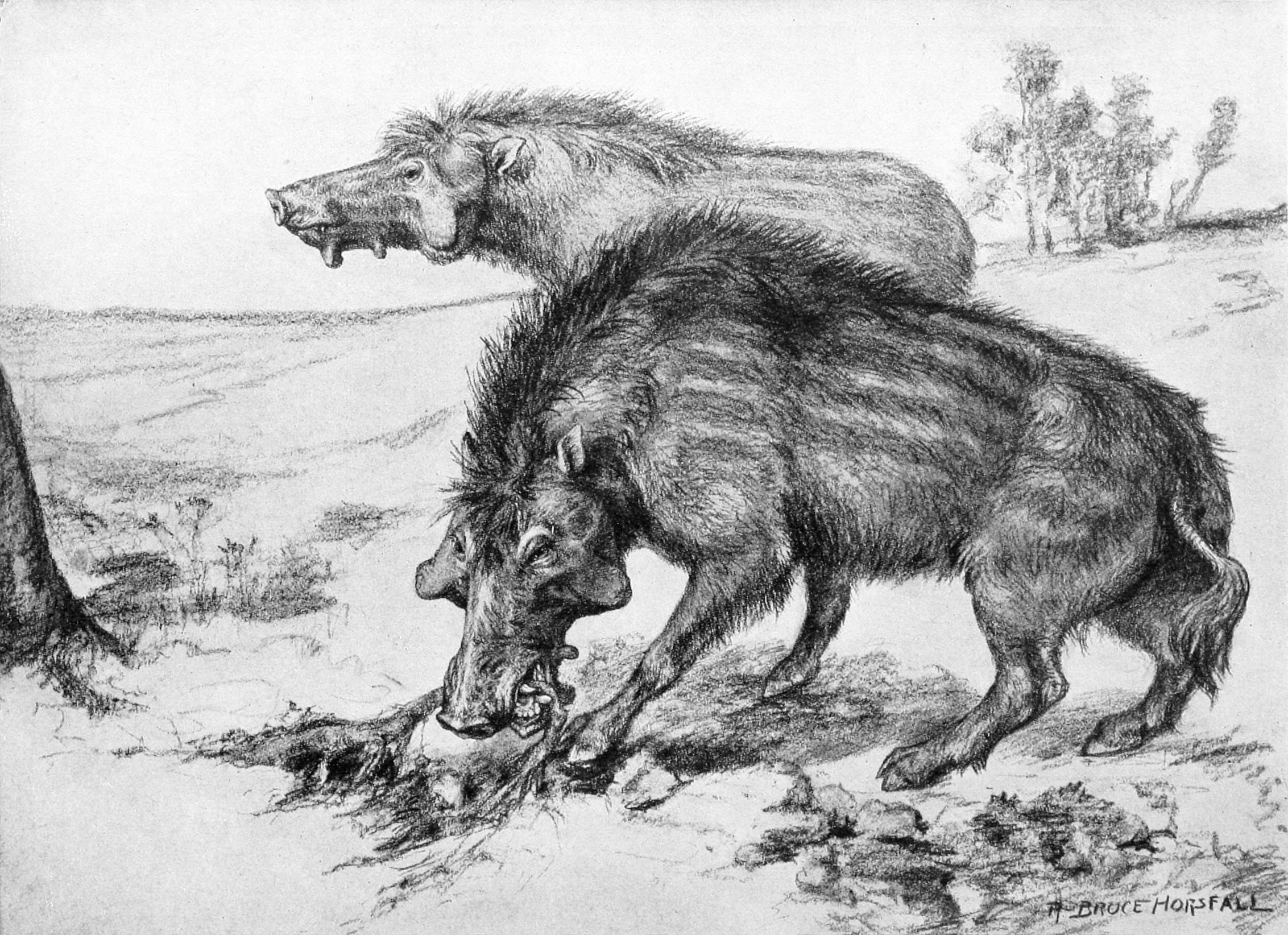
- Life restoration of the Eocene-Oligocene entelodont mammal Archaeotherium
  †Archaeotherium
  - †Archaeotherium lemleyi – type locality for species
  - †Archaeotherium marshi – type locality for species
  - †Archaeotherium mortoni
  - †Archaeotherium trippensis – type locality for species
- †Arctodus
  - †Arctodus simus
- †Arctonasua
- †Arretotherium
  - †Arretotherium fricki
  - †Arretotherium leptodus – type locality for species
- Azolla
  - †Azolla schopfi – type locality for species

== B ==
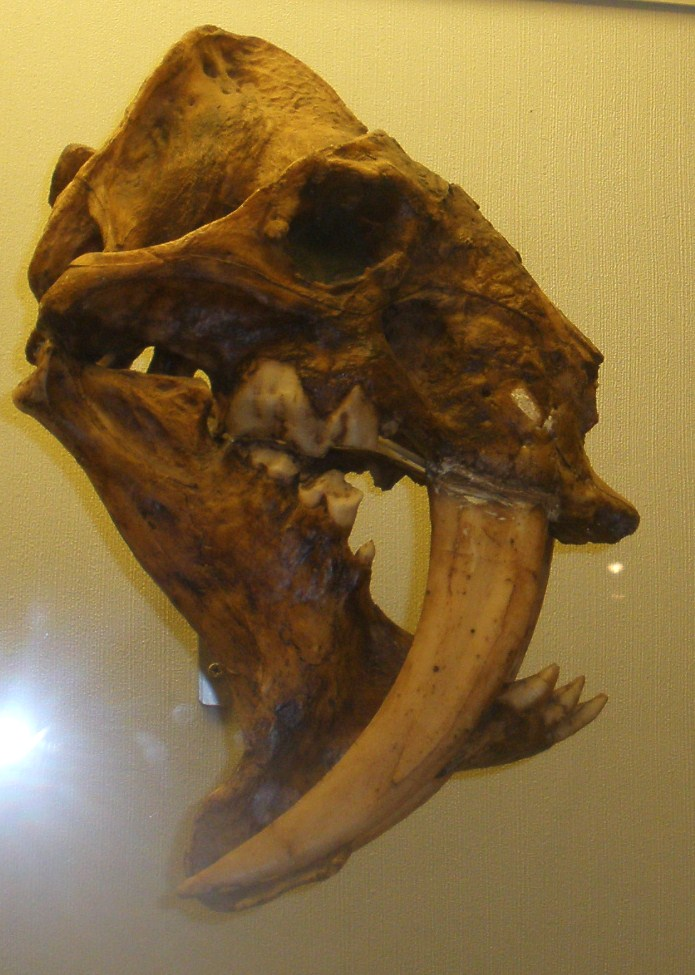
- Fossilized skull of the Miocene-Pliocene false saber-toothed cat Barbourofelis
  †Barbourofelis
  - †Barbourofelis whitfordi
- †Barbouromeryx
  - †Barbouromeryx trigonocorneus
- †Bathornis
  - †Bathornis celeripes
  - †Bathornis veredus
- Bison
  - †Bison latifrons
- Blarina
  - †Blarina carolinensis – or unidentified comparable form
- †Boochoerus
  - †Boochoerus angustus – type locality for species
- †Bothriodon
  - †Bothriodon americanus – type locality for species
  - †Bothriodon rostratus
- †Brachyerix
  - †Brachyerix incertis – or unidentified comparable form
- †Brachygaulus – or unidentified comparable form
- †Brachypsalis
  - †Brachypsalis modicus
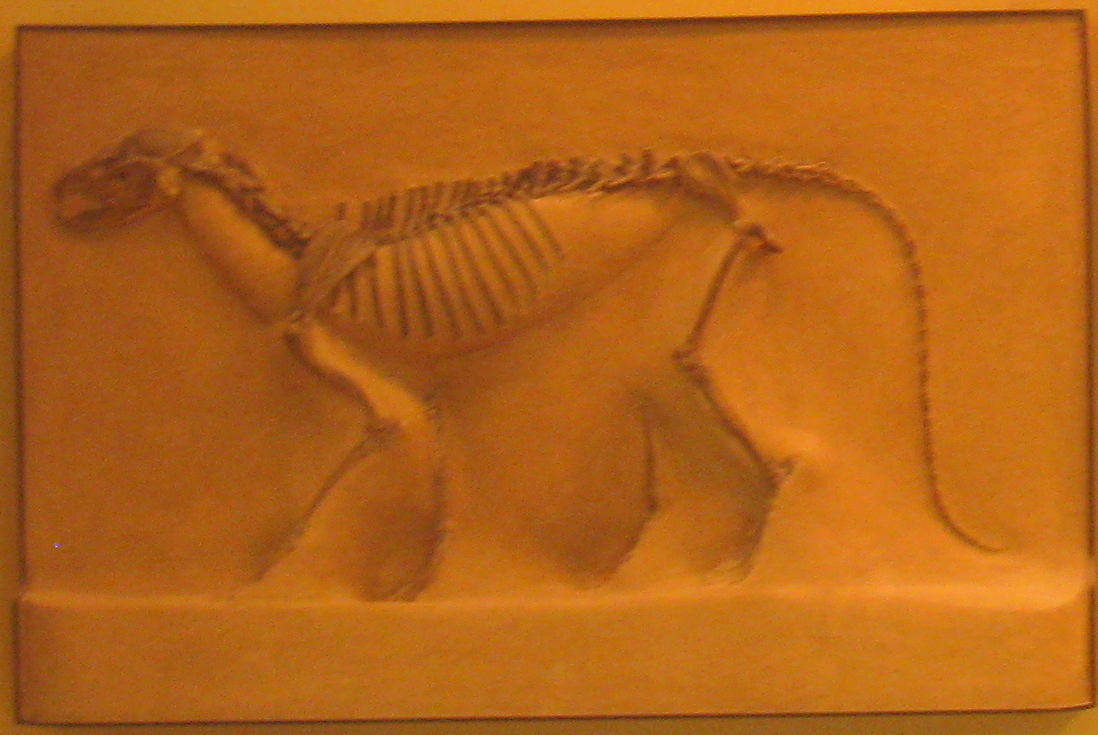
- Skeletal reconstruction of the Eocene-Oligocene bear-dog Brachyrhynchocyon
  †Brachyrhynchocyon
  - †Brachyrhynchocyon dodgei
- †Brontops
  - †Brontops bicornutus
  - †Brontops brachycephalus
  - †Brontops dispar
  - †Brontops robustus – type locality for species
  - †Brontops tyleri – type locality for species
- Bufo
  - †Bufo pliocompactilis
  - †Bufo woodhousei
- Buteo
  - †Buteo grangeri – type locality for species

== C ==
- †Calamagras
  - †Calamagras angulatus
  - †Calamagras weigeli
- †Calippus
  - †Calippus martini
  - †Calippus placidus
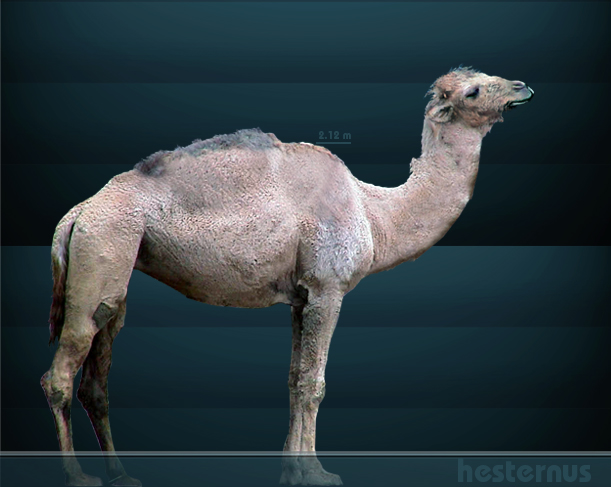
- Life restoration of the Pliocene-Holocene camel Camelops
  †Camelops
- Canis
  - †Canis dirus – or unidentified comparable form
  - †Canis latrans
  - †Canis lupus
- †Capacikala
  - †Capacikala parvus
- †Capatanka
  - †Capatanka gaulodon
  - †Capatanka minor
- †Carpocyon
  - †Carpocyon robustus
- Castor
  - †Castor canadensis – or unidentified comparable form
  - †Castor peninsulatus
- †Catostomus
- Celtis
- †Centetodon
  - †Centetodon magnus
  - †Centetodon marginalis
  - †Centetodon wolffi
- Cercidiphyllum
  - †Cercidiphyllum arcticum
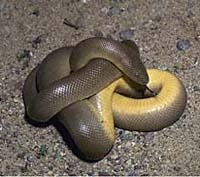
- A living Charina boa
  Charina
  - †Charina prebottae
- Chrysemys
  - †Chrysemys antiqua
- †Clinopternodus
  - †Clinopternodus gracilis
- Cnemidophorus
- †Colodon
  - †Colodon cingulatus
  - †Colodon occidentalis
- †Copemys
  - †Copemys longidens
- †Coprophis – type locality for genus
  - †Coprophis dakotaensis – type locality for species
- †Cormocyon
  - †Cormocyon haydeni – type locality for species
- †Cormohipparion
  - †Cormohipparion fricki
  - †Cormohipparion quinni
- †Cosoryx
  - †Cosoryx furcatus
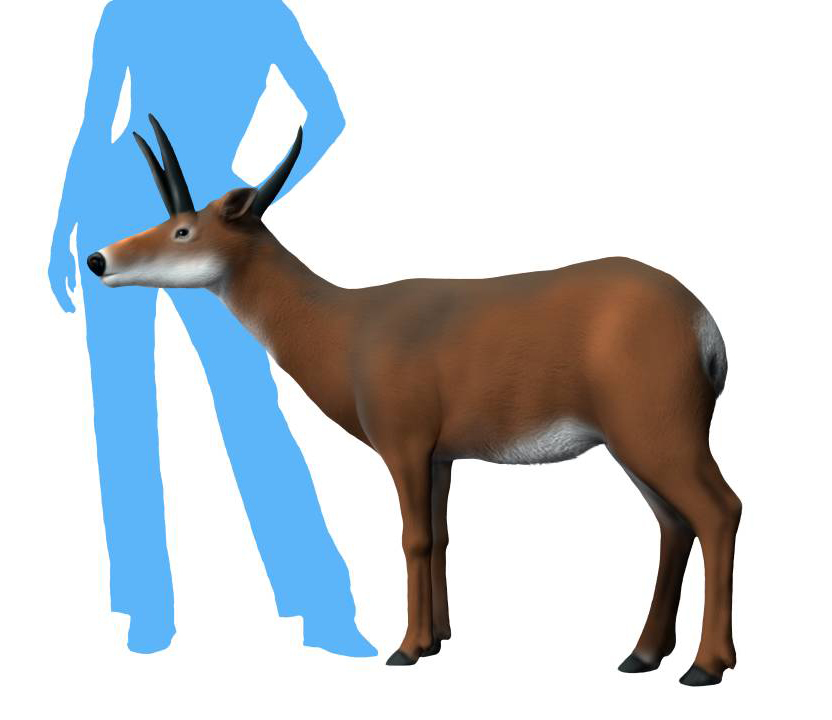
- Restoration of the Miocene palaeomerycid Cranioceras, a relative of modern deer, with anachronistic human to scale
  †Cranioceras
  - †Cranioceras unicornis
- Crotalus
- †Crucimys
  - †Crucimys milleri
- †Cupidinimus
  - †Cupidinimus smaragdinus – type locality for species
- †Cymaprimadon
  - †Cymaprimadon kenni – type locality for species
- †Cynarctoides
  - †Cynarctoides acridens
  - †Cynarctoides lemur
  - †Cynarctoides roii
- †Cynarctus
  - †Cynarctus crucidens
- †Cynodesmus
  - †Cynodesmus thooides
- Cynomys

== D ==
- †Dakotallomys
  - †Dakotallomys lillegraveni
  - †Dakotallomys pelycomyoides
- †Dakotaophis – type locality for genus
  - †Dakotaophis greeni – type locality for species
- Life restoration of the Eocene-Miocene bear dog Daphoenus
  †Daphoenus
  - †Daphoenus hartshornianus
  - †Daphoenus vetus
- †Dendrochen – type locality for genus
  - †Dendrochen robusta – type locality for species
- †Desmathyus
  - †Desmathyus pinensis
- †Desmatippus
  - †Desmatippus texanus
- †Desmatochoerus
  - †Desmatochoerus megalodon
- †Desmocyon
  - †Desmocyon thomsoni
- †Diceratherium
  - †Diceratherium annectens
  - †Diceratherium armatum – type locality for species
  - †Diceratherium radtkei
  - †Diceratherium tridactylum – type locality for species
- †Dikkomys
  - †Dikkomys matthewi
- †Dinictis
  - †Dinictis felina
- †Dinohyus
- †Dipoides
- †Disallomys
  - †Disallomys robustus
- †Domnina
  - †Domnina dakotensis – type locality for species
  - †Domnina gradata
  - †Domnina greeni – type locality for species
- †Domninoides
  - †Domninoides riparensis – type locality for species
- †Douglassciurus
  - †Douglassciurus bjorki – type locality for species
- †Downsimus
  - †Downsimus chadwicki – type locality for species
- †Duchesnehippus
  - †Duchesnehippus intermedius
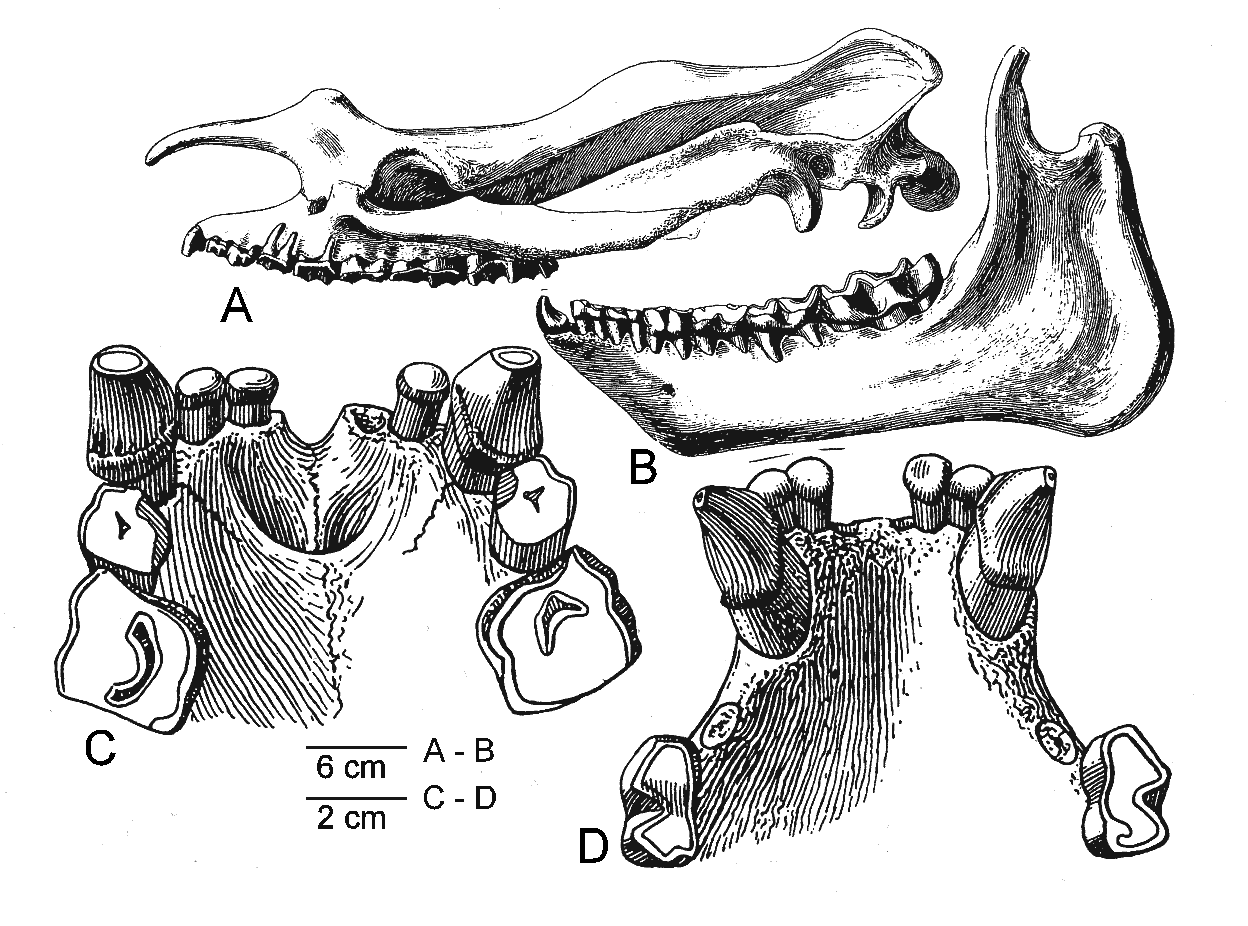
- Illustration of the fossilized jaws and teeth of the Eocene brontothere mammal Duchesneodus
  †Duchesneodus
  - †Duchesneodus uintensis

== E ==
- †Ectopocynus
  - †Ectopocynus antiquus
- †Ekgmowechashala
  - †Ekgmowechashala philotau – type locality for species
- Elaphe
  - †Elaphe nebraskensis
  - †Elaphe vulpina
- †Elomeryx
  - †Elomeryx armatus – type locality for species
  - †Elomeryx garbanii – type locality for species
- †Enhydrocyon
  - †Enhydrocyon crassidens – type locality for species
  - †Enhydrocyon pahinsintewakpa
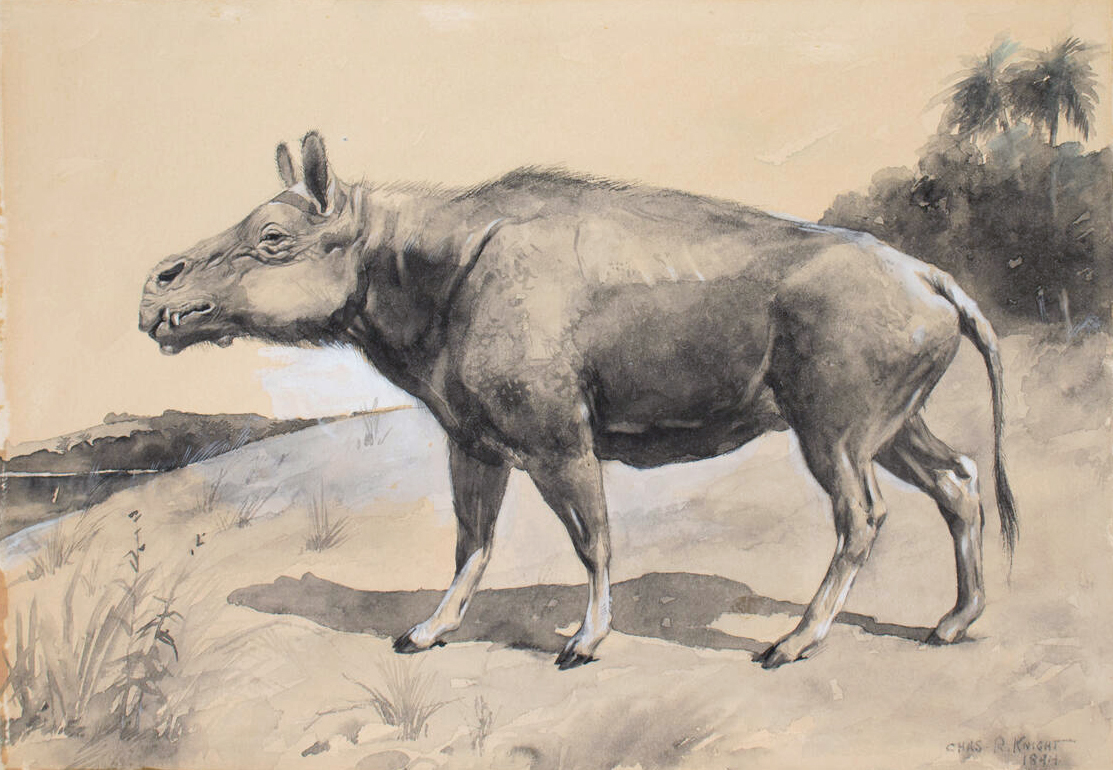
- Life restoration of the Eocene-Oligocene mammal Entelodon. Charles R. Knight.
  †Entelodon
  - †Entelodon coarctatus – or unidentified comparable form
- †Entoptychus
  - †Entoptychus leptophrys
- †Eopelobates
  - †Eopelobates grandis – type locality for species
- †Epeiromys
- †Epicyon
  - †Epicyon saevus
- Equus
  - †Equus francisci
  - †Equus giganteus – or unidentified comparable form
- †Etheostoma
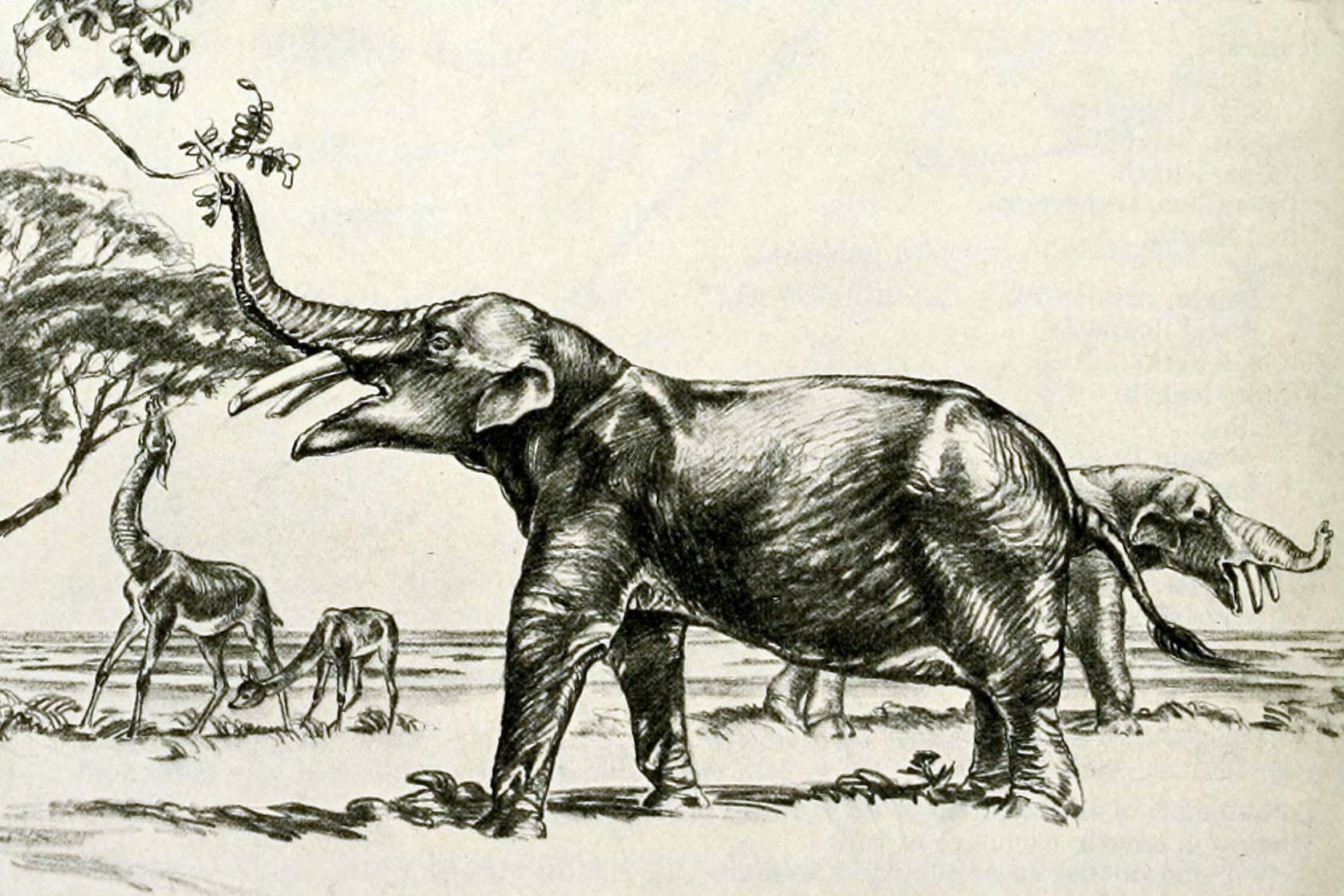
- Life restoration of the Miocene elephant relative Eubelodon
  †Eubelodon
  - †Eubelodon morrilli
- †Eucastor
  - †Eucastor tortus
- †Eucommia
  - †Eucommia serrata
- Eumeces
  - †Eumeces septentrionalis
- †Eumys
  - †Eumys brachyodus
  - †Eumys elegans
- †Eusmilus
  - †Eusmilus sicarius
- †Eutypomys
  - †Eutypomys montanensis – or unidentified comparable form
  - †Eutypomys thomsoni – type locality for species
  - †Eutypomys wilsoni – or unidentified comparable form

== F ==
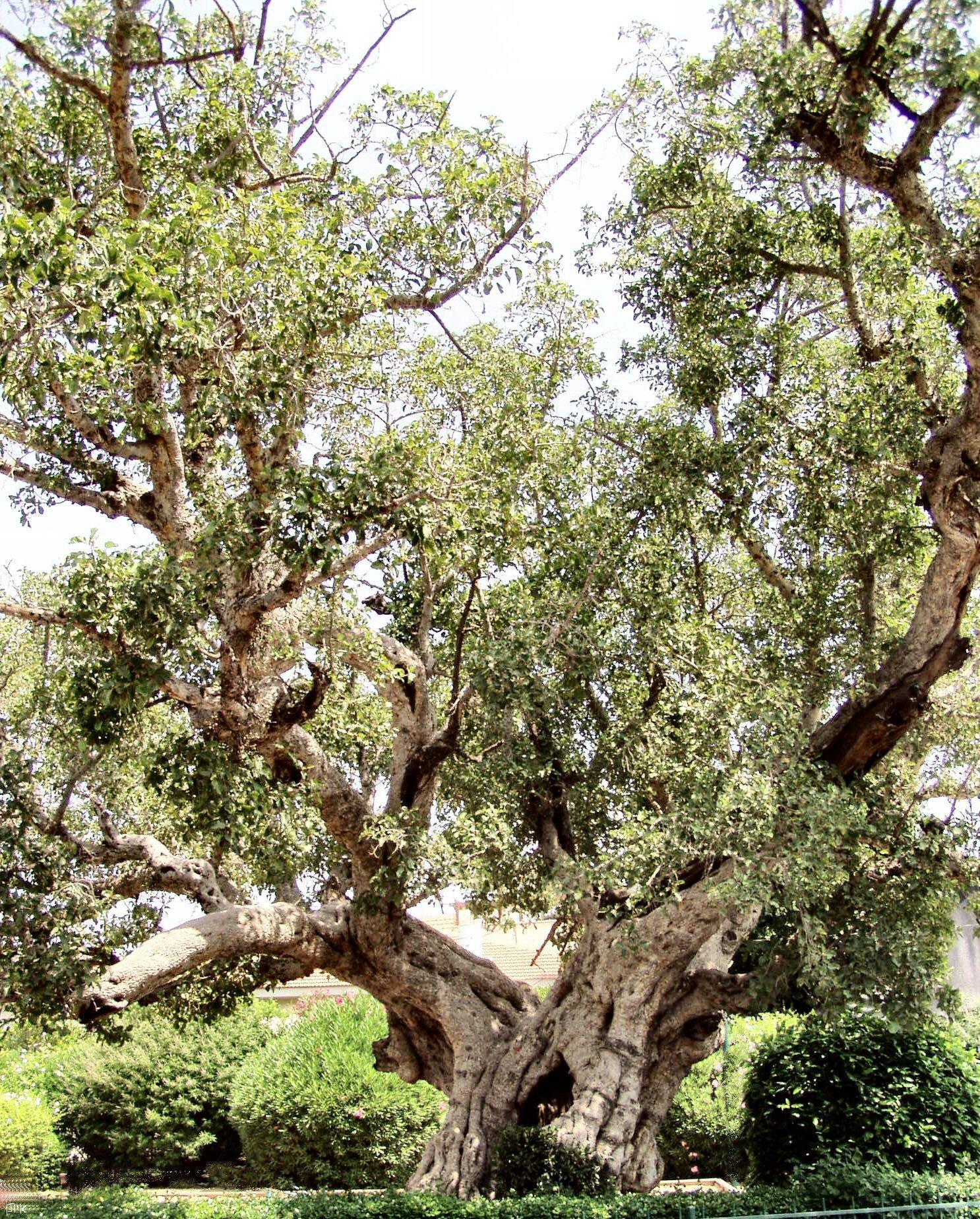
- A living Ficus, or fig tree
  Ficus
  - †Ficus artocarpoides
  - †Ficus subtruncata
- †Florentiamys
  - †Florentiamys agnewi – type locality for species
  - †Florentiamys tiptoni
- †Fossorcastor
  - †Fossorcastor brachyceps

== G ==
- †Galbreathia
  - †Galbreathia novellus
- Geomys
- †Geringia
  - †Geringia gloveri
  - †Geringia mcgregori
- †Gigantocamelus
  - †Gigantocamelus spatulus
- Glyptostrobus
  - †Glyptostrobus nordenskioldi
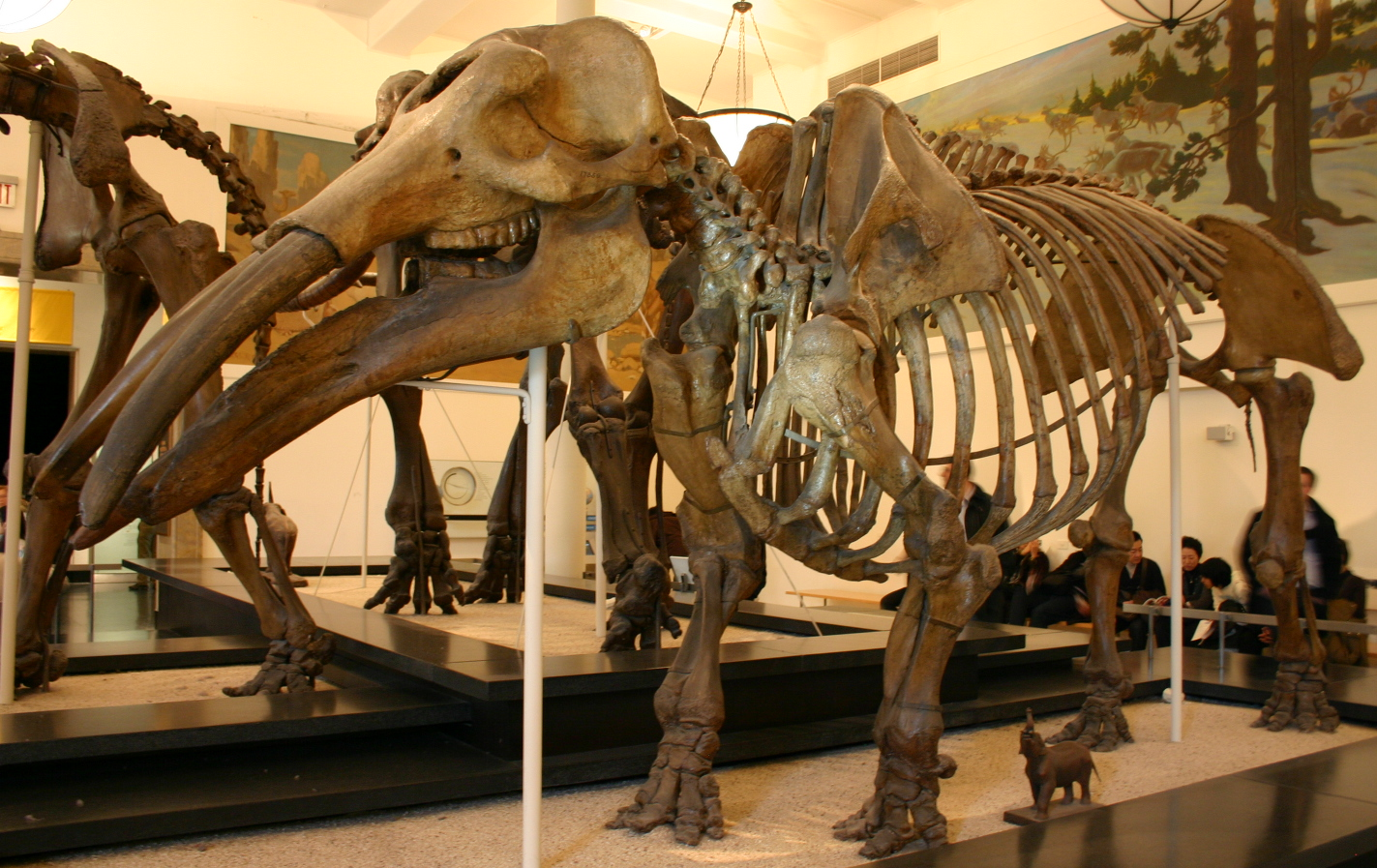
- Mounted fossilized skeleton of the Miocene-Pleistocene elephant relative Gomphotherium
  †Gomphotherium
  - †Gomphotherium obscurum
- †Grangerimus
  - †Grangerimus dakotensis
- Graptemys
- †Gregorymys
  - †Gregorymys curtus – type locality for species
  - †Gregorymys formosus – type locality for species
- †Gripholagomys – type locality for genus
  - †Gripholagomys lavocati – type locality for species
- †Guildayomys
  - †Guildayomys hibbardi – or unidentified comparable form

== H ==
- †Haplomys
  - †Haplomys galbreathi – type locality for species
- †Heliscomys
  - †Heliscomys senex
- †Hemiauchenia
- †Hemicyon
  - †Hemicyon barbouri
- †Heptacodon
  - †Heptacodon curtus – type locality for species
  - †Heptacodon gibbiceps – type locality for species
  - †Heptacodon occidentale
- †Herpetotherium
  - †Herpetotherium fugax
  - †Herpetotherium youngi
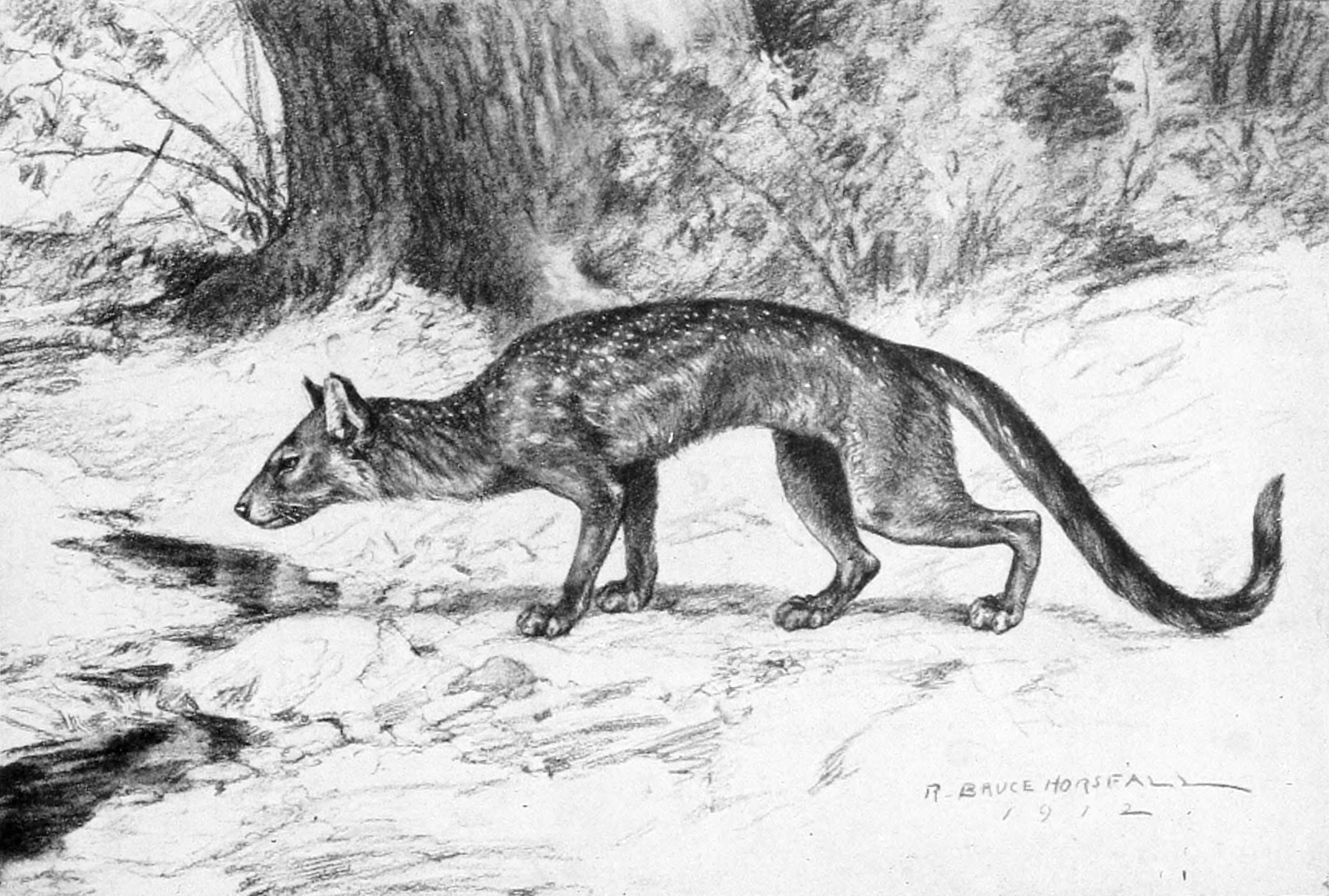
- Life restoration of the Eocene-Oligocene dog Hesperocyon. Robert Bruce Horsfall (1913).
  †Hesperocyon
  - †Hesperocyon gregarius
- †Hesperolagomys – tentative report
- †Hesperopetes
  - †Hesperopetes blacki – type locality for species
  - †Hesperopetes jamesi – type locality for species
- †Hesperotestudo
  - †Hesperotestudo niobrarensis
- Heterodon
- †Heteromeryx
  - †Heteromeryx dispar – type locality for species
- †Hibbarderix
  - †Hibbarderix obfuscatus
- †Hibbardomys
  - †Hibbardomys marthae – or unidentified comparable form
  - †Hibbardomys zakrzewskii
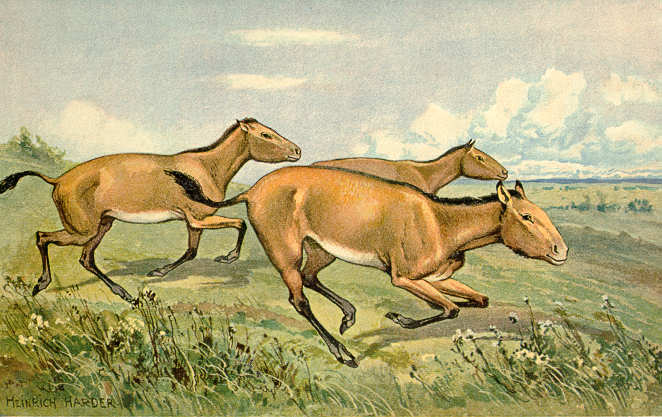
- Life restoration of a herd of the Miocene-Pleistocene horse Hipparion. Heinrich Harder (1920).
  †Hipparion
  - †Hipparion tehonense
- †Hippotherium
  - †Hippotherium dolichops – type locality for species
- †Hitonkala
  - †Hitonkala andersontau – type locality for species
- †Homotherium – or unidentified comparable form
- †Hoplophoneus
  - †Hoplophoneus cerebralis
  - †Hoplophoneus mentalis
  - †Hoplophoneus occidentalis
  - †Hoplophoneus primaevus
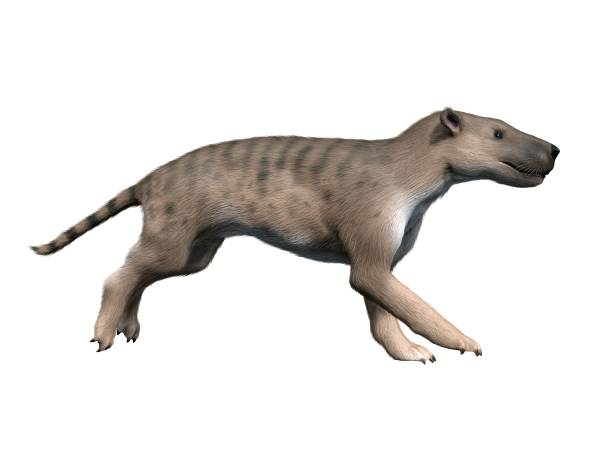
- Life restoration of the Eocene-Miocene creodont mammal Hyaenodon
  †Hyaenodon
  - †Hyaenodon brevirostrus – type locality for species
  - †Hyaenodon crucians
  - †Hyaenodon horridus
  - †Hyaenodon montanus – or unidentified comparable form
  - †Hyaenodon mustelinus – type locality for species
- Hyla
- †Hypertragulus
  - †Hypertragulus calcaratus
  - †Hypertragulus dakotensis – type locality for species
- †Hypisodus
  - †Hypisodus minimus
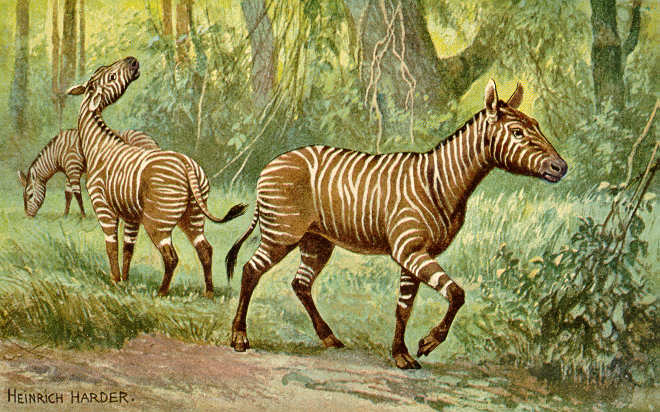
- Life restoration of the Miocene horse Hypohippus. Heinrich Harder (1920).
  †Hypohippus
- †Hypolagus
  - †Hypolagus fontinalis – type locality for species
  - †Hypolagus vetus – or unidentified comparable form
- †Hyporhina – type locality for genus
  - †Hyporhina antiqua – type locality for species
- †Hyracodon
  - †Hyracodon leidyanus – type locality for species
  - †Hyracodon nebraskensis
  - †Hyracodon priscidens – or unidentified comparable form

== I ==
- Ictalurus
- †Ischyrocyon
  - †Ischyrocyon gidleyi
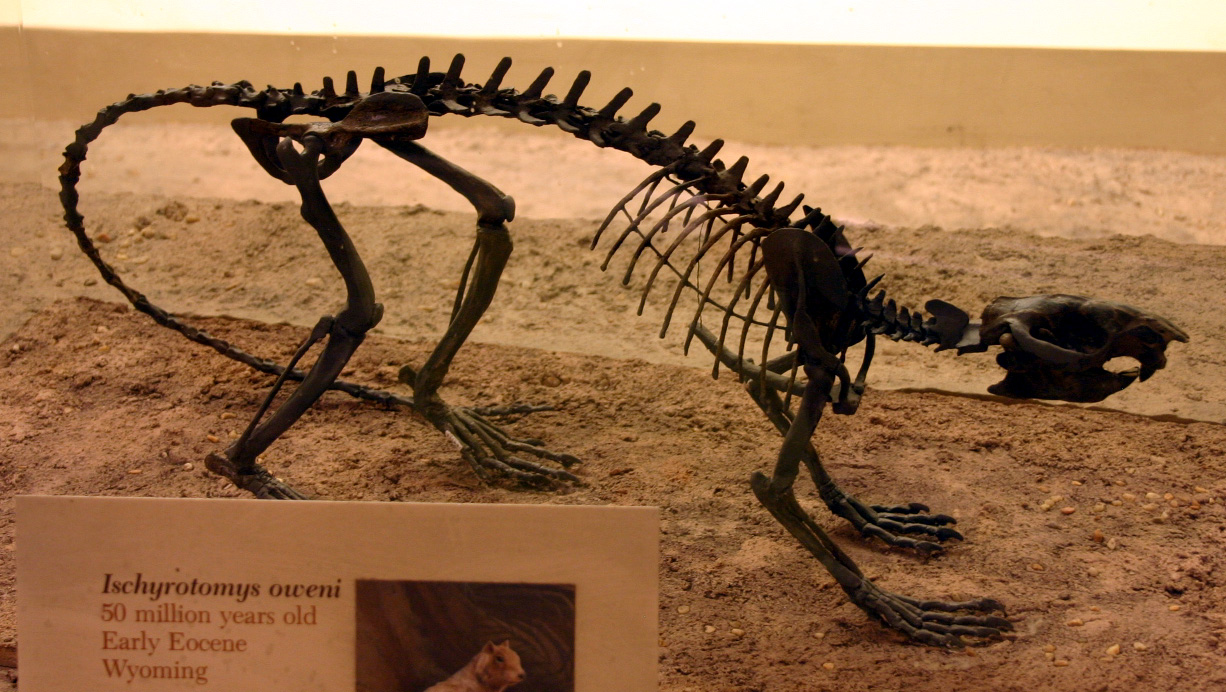
- Mounted fossilized skeleton of the Eocene-Oligocene rodent Ischyromys
  †Ischyromys
  - †Ischyromys typus

== J ==
- †Javazapus
  - †Javazapus weeksi

== K ==
- †Kirkomys
  - †Kirkomys martintau
  - †Kirkomys nebraskensis

== L ==
- †Lambdoceras
  - †Lambdoceras hessei – type locality for species
- Lampropeltis
  - †Lampropeltis similis
- †Leidymys
  - †Leidymys blacki
  - †Leidymys juxtaparvulus
- Lepisosteus
- Lepomis
- †Leptarctus
  - †Leptarctus primus – type locality for species
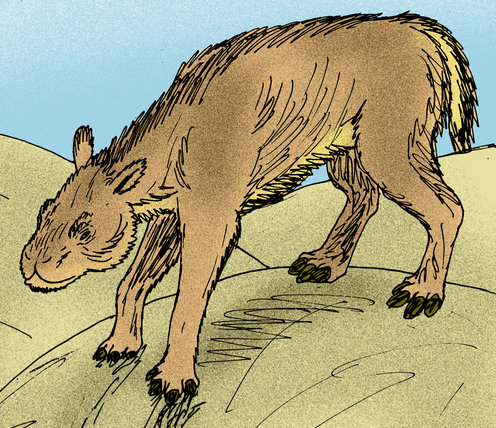
- Restoration of the Oligocene-Miocene oreodont mammal Leptauchenia
  †Leptauchenia
  - †Leptauchenia decora – type locality for species
  - †Leptauchenia major – type locality for species
- †Leptictis
  - †Leptictis dakotensis
  - †Leptictis haydeni
- †Leptochoerus
  - †Leptochoerus elegans
  - †Leptochoerus supremus – type locality for species
- †Leptocyon
  - †Leptocyon delicatus – type locality for species
  - †Leptocyon douglassi
  - †Leptocyon gregorii
  - †Leptocyon matthewi
  - †Leptocyon vafer – or unidentified comparable form
  - †Leptocyon vulpinus
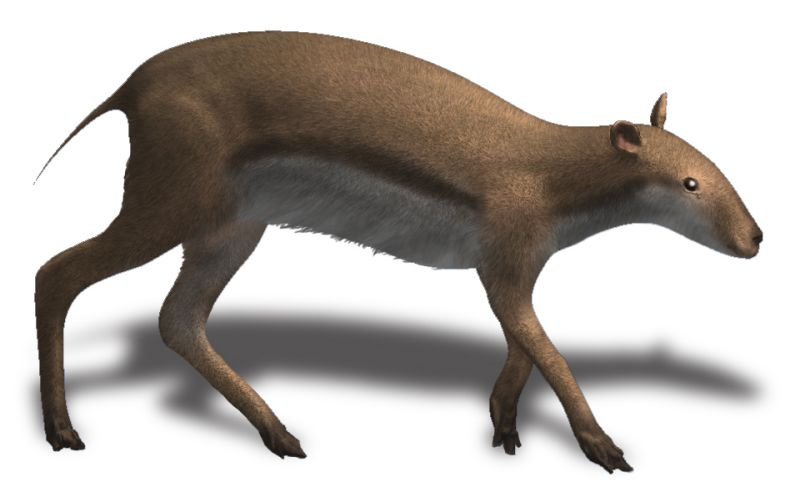
- Life restoration of the Eocene-Oligocene even-toed ungulate Leptomeryx
  †Leptomeryx
  - †Leptomeryx evansi
- †Leptoromys
  - †Leptoromys wilsoni – type locality for species
- Lepus
  - †Lepus americanus – or unidentified comparable form
  - †Lepus ennisianus – or unidentified comparable form
- †Lignimus
  - †Lignimus austridakotensis – type locality for species
- †Limnoecus
  - †Limnoecus compressus – or unidentified comparable form
  - †Limnoecus niobrarensis
- †Longirostromeryx
  - †Longirostromeryx wellsi – type locality for species

== M ==
- †Macrogenis
  - †Macrogenis crassigenis
- †Macrognathomys
  - †Macrognathomys gemmacolis – type locality for species
- †Macrorhineura – type locality for genus
  - †Macrorhineura skinneri – type locality for species
- †Mammacyon
  - †Mammacyon obtusidens – type locality for species
- †Mammuthus
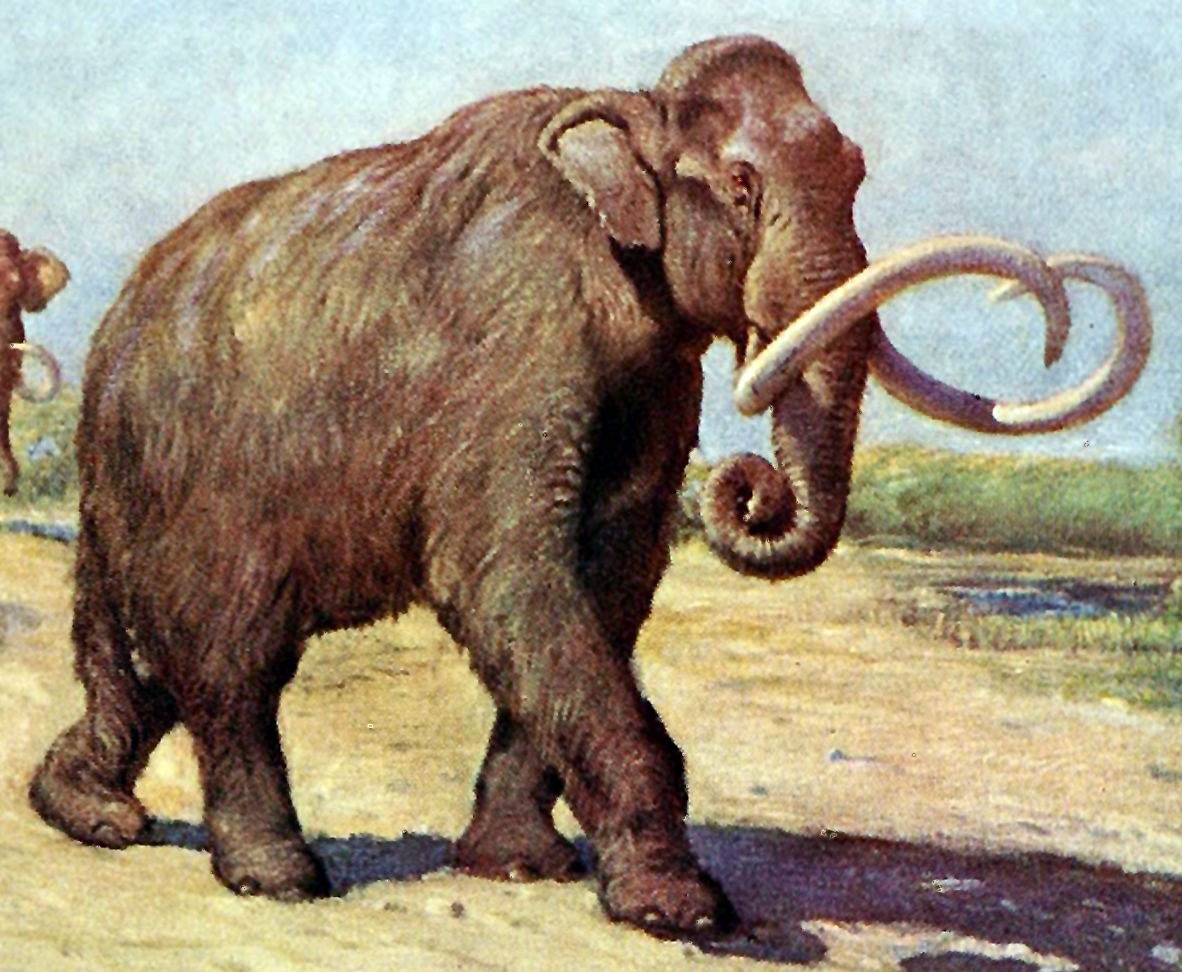
  - Life restoration of a herd of Mammuthus columbi, or Columbian mammoths. The extent of the fur depicted is hypothetical. Charles R. Knight (1909).
    †Mammuthus columbi
  - †Mammuthus primigenius
- †Manitsha – type locality for genus
  - †Manitsha tanka – type locality for species
- Martes
  - †Martes campestris
- †Megacerops
  - †Megacerops coloradensis
  - †Megacerops curtus
- †Megachoerus – tentative report
  - †Megachoerus latidens – type locality for species
- †Megalagus
  - †Megalagus primitivus – or unidentified comparable form
  - †Megalagus turgidus
- †Megaleptictis
  - †Megaleptictis altidens
- †Megalictis
  - †Megalictis ferox – type locality for species
- †Megalonyx
  - †Megalonyx leptostomus
  - †Megalonyx wheatleyi
- †Megapaloelodus – type locality for genus
  - †Megapaloelodus connectens – type locality for species
- †Megasminthus
  - †Megasminthus gladiofex – type locality for species
  - †Megasminthus tiheni
- †Megoreodon
  - †Megoreodon grandis
- †Meniscomys
  - †Meniscomys hippodus
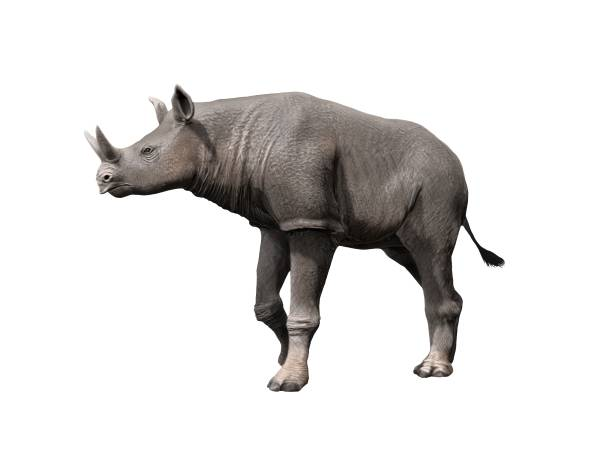
- Life restoration of the Miocene rhinoceros Menoceras
  †Menoceras
  - †Menoceras barbouri
- †Menops
  - †Menops marshi
  - †Menops serotinus
  - †Menops walcotti
- †Merychippus
  - †Merychippus insignis
- †Merychyus
  - †Merychyus arenarum
  - †Merychyus minimus
  - †Merychyus novomexicanus
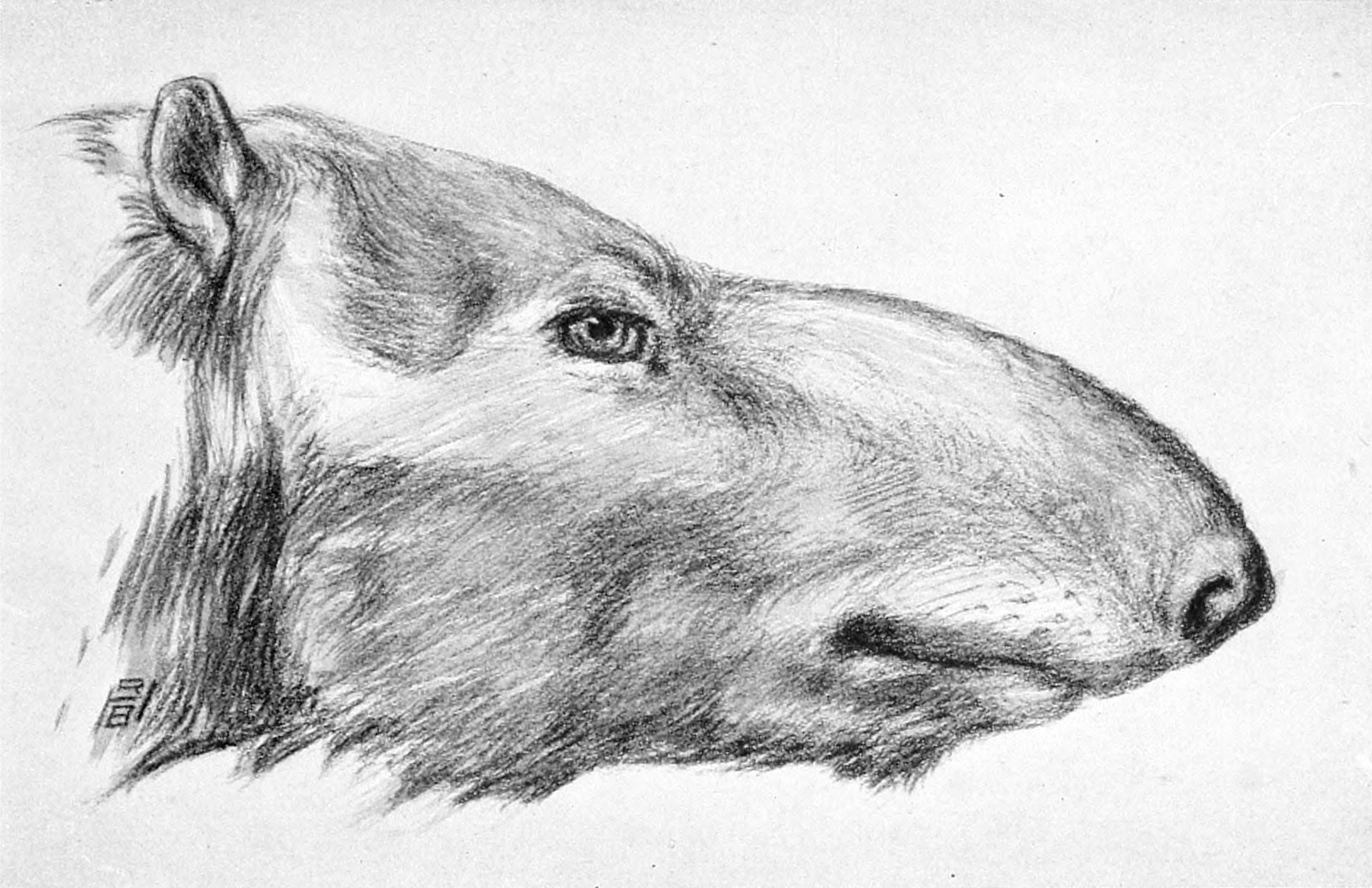
- Restorative portrait of the Oligocene-Miocene oreodont mammal Merycochoerus
  †Merycochoerus
  - †Merycochoerus chelydra
  - †Merycochoerus matthewi – type locality for species
- †Merycodus
  - †Merycodus major – or unidentified comparable form
  - †Merycodus necatus
- †Merycoides
  - †Merycoides longiceps
  - †Merycoides pariogonus – or unidentified comparable form
- †Merycoidodon
  - †Merycoidodon bullatus – type locality for species
  - †Merycoidodon culbertsoni – type locality for species
  - †Merycoidodon major
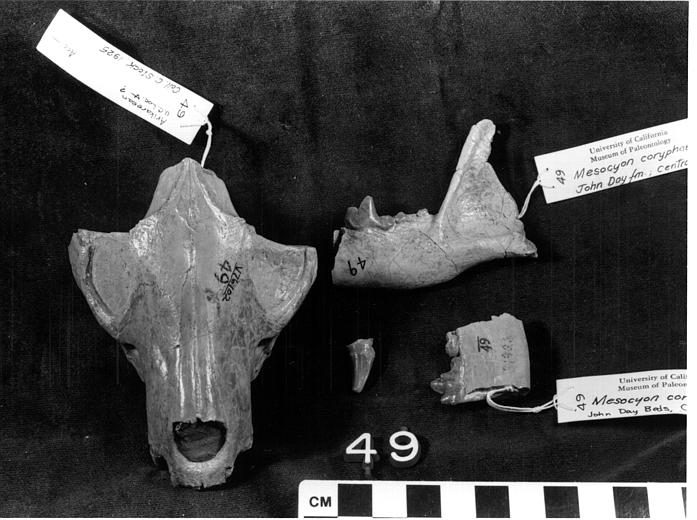
- Skull fossils of the Oligocene-Miocene dog Mesocyon
  †Mesocyon
  - †Mesocyon temnodon
- †Mesohippus
  - †Mesohippus bairdi
  - †Mesohippus exoletus
- †Mesoreodon
  - †Mesoreodon chelonyx
  - †Mesoreodon minor
- †Mesoscalops
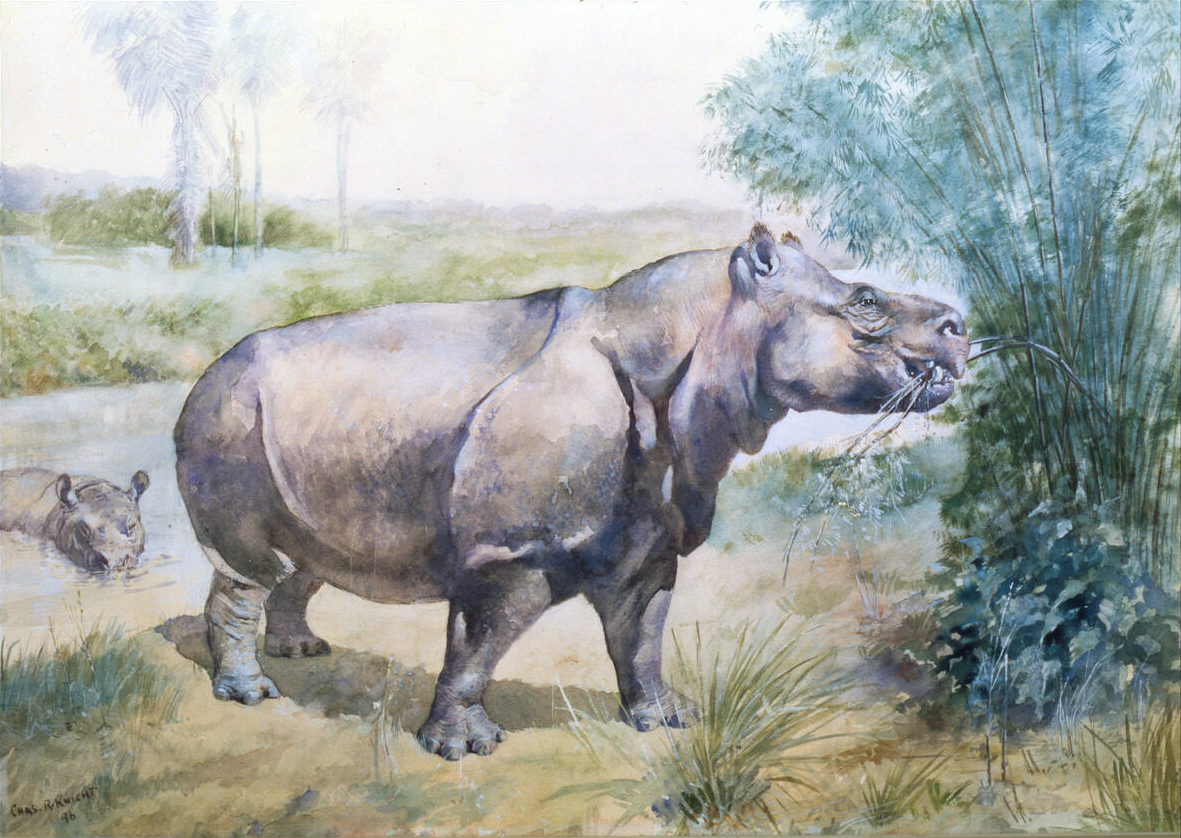
- Restoration of the Eocene-Miocene swamp rhinoceros Metamynodon. Charles R. Knight (1896).
  †Metamynodon
  - †Metamynodon chadronensis – type locality for species
  - †Metamynodon planifrons
- †Michenia
  - †Michenia exilis
- Microtus
  - †Microtus meadensis
  - †Microtus paroperarius
- Mictomys
  - †Mictomys kansasensis
- †Mimomys
  - †Mimomys dakotaensis
- †Miniochoerus
  - †Miniochoerus affinis
  - †Miniochoerus forsythae
  - †Miniochoerus gracilis
  - †Miniochoerus starkensis – type locality for species
- †Mioheteromys
  - †Mioheteromys arcarius
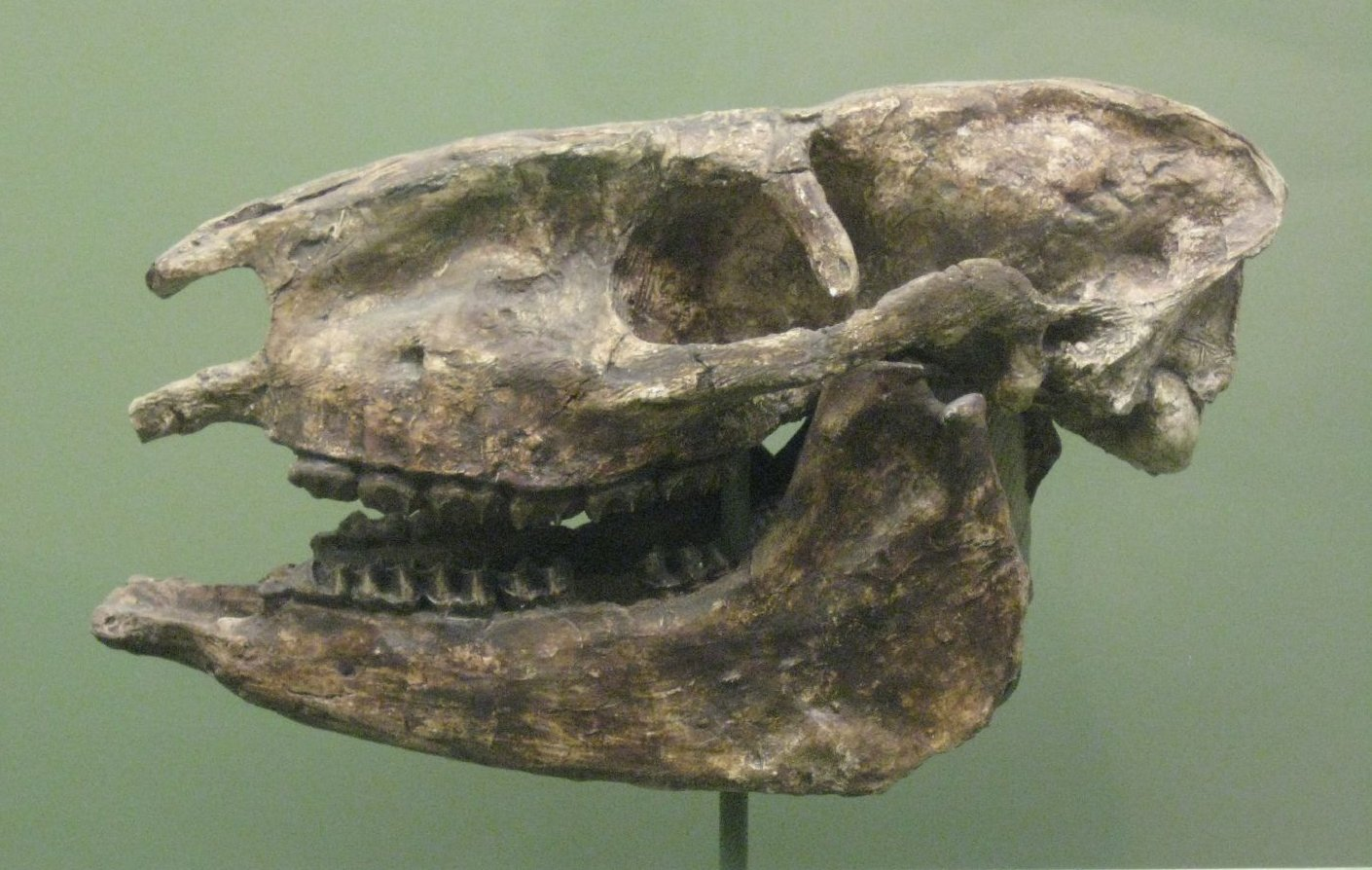
- Fossilized skull of the Eocene-Oligocene three-toed horse Miohippus
  †Miohippus
  - †Miohippus annectens – type locality for species
  - †Miohippus equiceps
  - †Miohippus equinanus
  - †Miohippus gemmarosae – or unidentified comparable form
  - †Miohippus gidleyi – type locality for species
  - †Miohippus grandis
  - †Miohippus intermedius – type locality for species
  - †Miohippus obliquidens – type locality for species
- †Mionictis
  - †Mionictis pristinus
- †Miortyx – type locality for genus
  - †Miortyx teres – type locality for species
- †Miospermophilus – or unidentified comparable form
- †Monosaulax
  - †Monosaulax curtus – or unidentified comparable form
- †Moropus
- Mustela
- †Mustelavus
  - †Mustelavus priscus – type locality for species
- †Mylagaulus
  - †Mylagaulus sesquipedalis – or unidentified comparable form
- †Mystipterus
  - †Mystipterus martini – or unidentified comparable form

== N ==
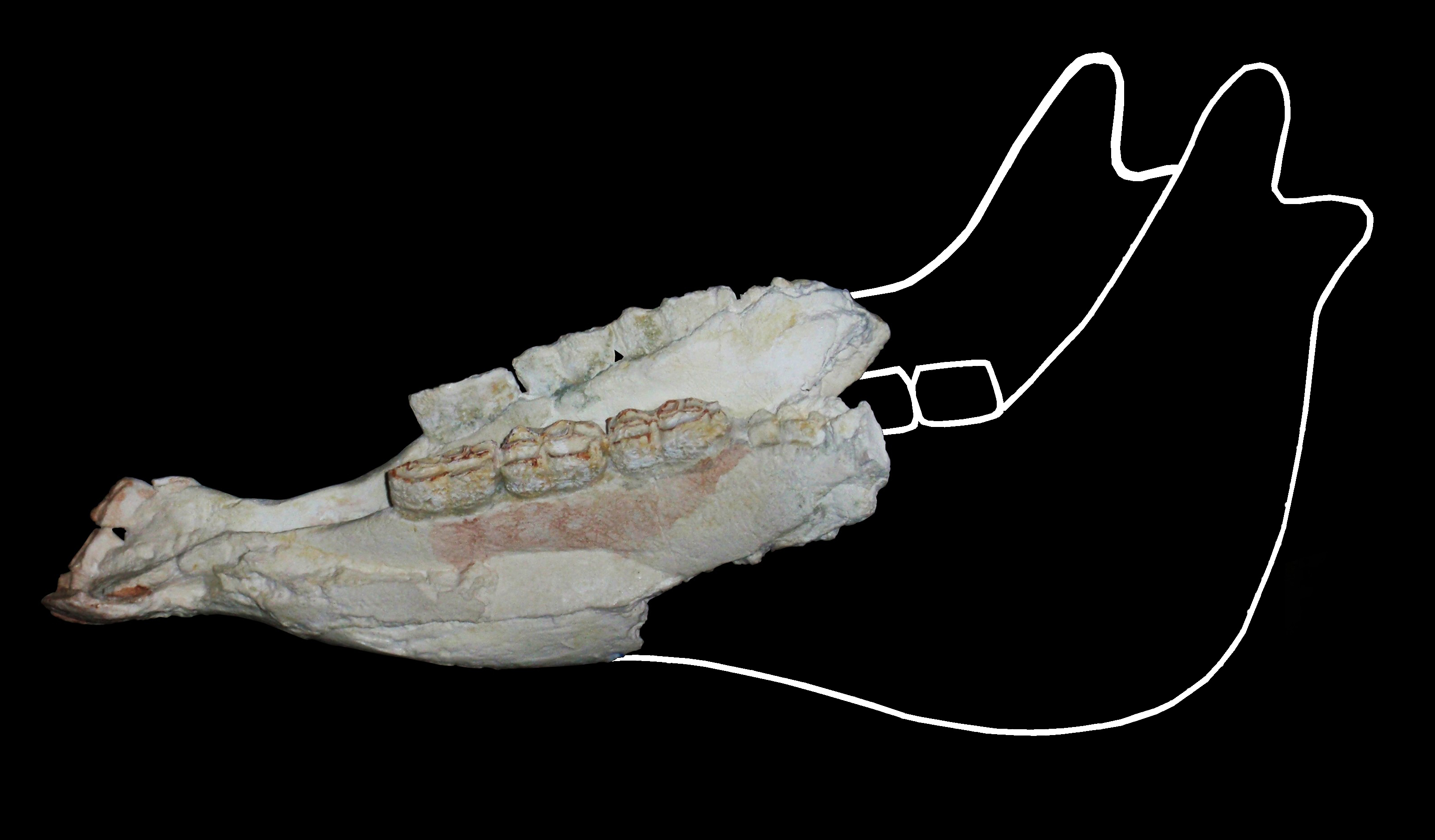
- Partial fossilized mandible of the Miocene-Pliocene horse Nannippus
  †Nannippus
- †Nanotragulus
  - †Nanotragulus loomisi
  - †Nanotragulus ordinatus – type locality for species
- †Nelumbago
  - †Nelumbago montanum
- †Neohipparion – type locality for genus
  - †Neohipparion affine – type locality for species
- †Neonatrix
  - †Neonatrix elongata
- Neotoma
  - †Neotoma amplidonta – type locality for species
- Nerodia
  - †Nerodia sipedon
- Nettion
  - †Nettion greeni – type locality for species
- †Nexuotapirus
  - †Nexuotapirus marslandensis
- †Niglarodon
  - †Niglarodon koerneri
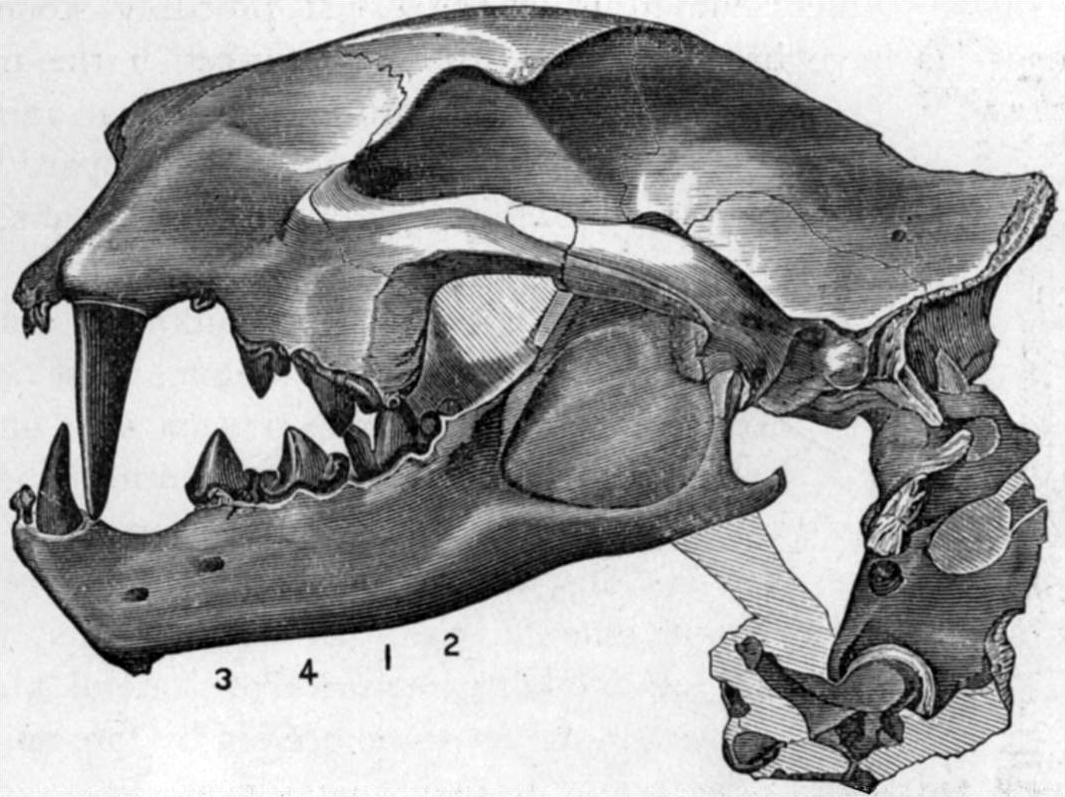
- Illustration of the fossilized skull of the Oligocene false saber-toothed cat Nimravus
  †Nimravus
  - †Nimravus sectator – type locality for species
- †Nothodipoides
  - †Nothodipoides planus
- Notophthalmus
  - †Notophthalmus crassus – type locality for species
- †Nototamias
  - †Nototamias quadratus
- †Notropis
- †Noturus – tentative report

== O ==
- †Ocajila
  - †Ocajila makpiyahe – type locality for species
- †Octacodon
  - †Octacodon valens – type locality for species
- †Ogmophis
  - †Ogmophis miocompactus – type locality for species
- †Oligoryctes
  - †Oligoryctes altitalonidus
- †Oligoscalops
  - †Oligoscalops galbreathi
- †Oligospermophilus
- †Oligotheriomys
  - †Oligotheriomys magnus – type locality for species
- Ondatra
  - †Ondatra annectens
- Onychomys
  - †Onychomys pedroensis
- †Oreodontoides
  - †Oreodontoides oregonensis
- Ortalis
  - †Ortalis pollicaris – type locality for species
- †Osbornodon
  - †Osbornodon sesnoni
- †Otarocyon
  - †Otarocyon cooki
  - †Otarocyon macdonaldi – type locality for species
- †Oxetocyon
  - †Oxetocyon cuspidatus – type locality for species
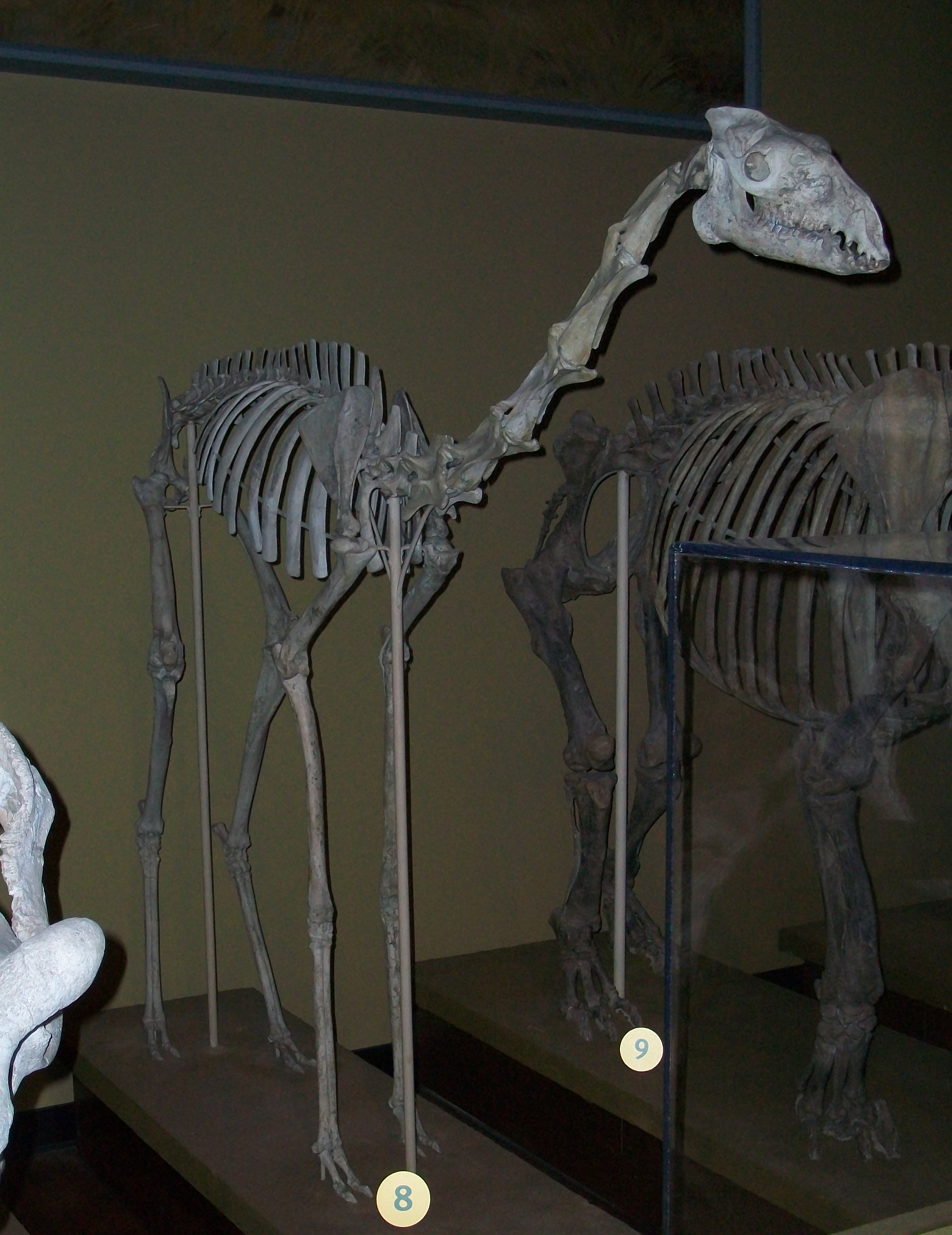
- Mounted fossilized skeleton of the Oligocene-Miocene camel Oxydactylus
  †Oxydactylus
  - †Oxydactylus lacota – type locality for species
  - †Oxydactylus wyomingensis – or unidentified comparable form

== P ==
- †Paciculus
  - †Paciculus cedrus – type locality for species
  - †Paciculus montanus – or unidentified comparable form
  - †Paciculus nebraskensis – or unidentified comparable form
  - †Paciculus woodi
- †Palaeoborus
  - †Palaeoborus rosatus – type locality for species
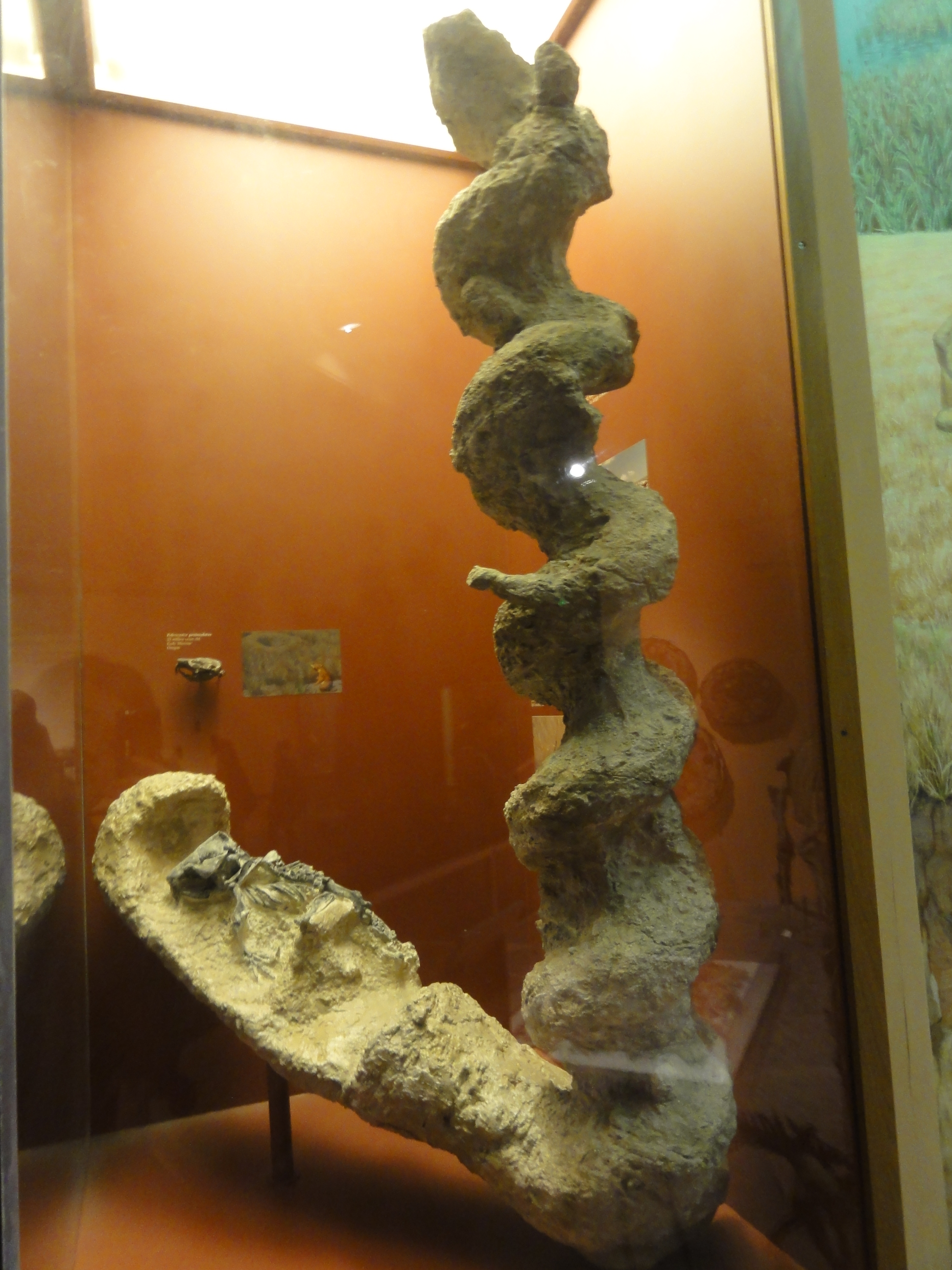
- Spiral-shaped fossilized burrow and associated skeleton of the Oligocene-Miocene beaver Palaeocastor
  †Palaeocastor
  - †Palaeocastor peninsulatus
  - †Palaeocastor wahlerti
- †Palaeogale
  - †Palaeogale dorothiae – type locality for species
  - †Palaeogale sectoria
- †Palaeolagus
  - †Palaeolagus burkei
  - †Palaeolagus haydeni
  - †Palaeolagus hypsodus
  - †Palaeolagus intermedius
  - †Palaeolagus philoi – type locality for species
- †Palaeonossax – type locality for genus
  - †Palaeonossax senectus – type locality for species
- †Paleoheterodon
  - †Paleoheterodon tiheni
- †Parablastomeryx
  - †Parablastomeryx gregorii
- †Paracrax
  - †Paracrax gigantea – type locality for species
  - †Paracrax wetmorei – type locality for species
- †Paradaphoenus
  - †Paradaphoenus minimus
  - †Paradaphoenus tooheyi – type locality for species
- †Paradjidaumo
  - †Paradjidaumo trilophus
- †Paraenhydrocyon
  - †Paraenhydrocyon robustus
- †Parahippus
  - †Parahippus cognatus – or unidentified comparable form
  - †Parahippus pawniensis
  - †Parahippus pristinus – type locality for species
- †Paramerychyus
  - †Paramerychyus harrisonensis
  - †Paramerychyus relictus
- †Paramys
  - †Paramys relictus
- †Paranymphaea
  - †Paranymphaea crassifolia
- †Paranyroca – type locality for genus
  - †Paranyroca magna – type locality for species
- †Parapliosaccomys
  - †Parapliosaccomys hibbardi – or unidentified related form
- †Paratomarctus
  - †Paratomarctus euthos
- †Paratylopus
  - †Paratylopus labiatus
- †Parictis
  - †Parictis dakotensis – type locality for species
  - †Parictis gilpini – type locality for species
  - †Parictis major – type locality for species
  - †Parictis parvus – type locality for species
- †Parvericius
  - †Parvericius montanus
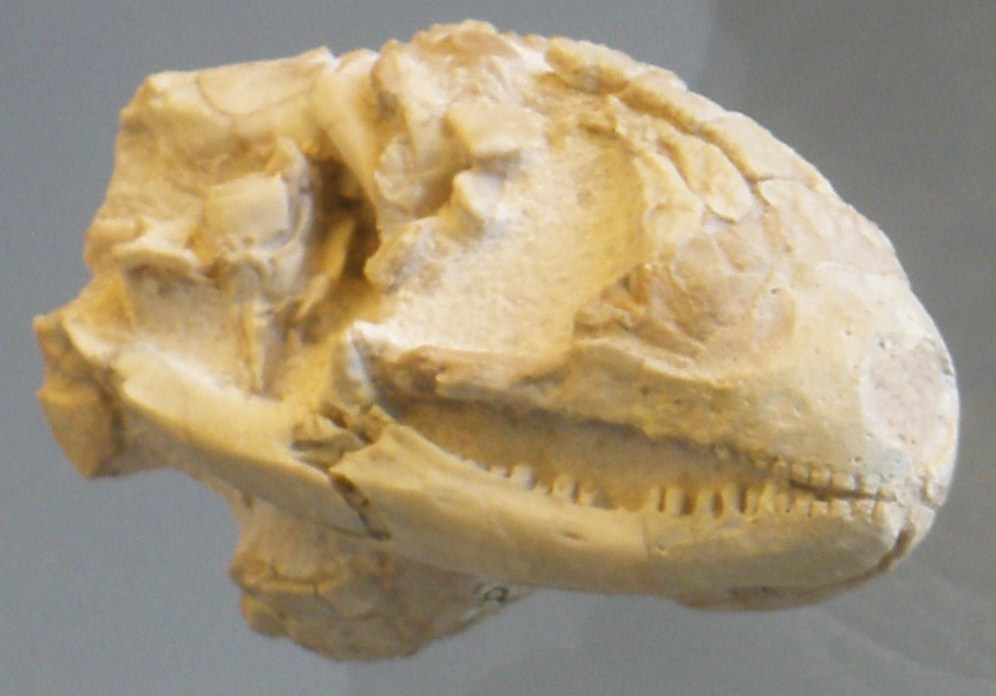
- Fossilized skull of the Eocene-Oligocene lizard Peltosaurus
  †Peltosaurus
  - †Peltosaurus granulosus
- †Pelycomys
  - †Pelycomys placidus
- †Penetrigonias
  - †Penetrigonias dakotensis
- †Peraceras
  - †Peraceras superciliosum
- †Perchoerus
  - †Perchoerus minor
  - †Perchoerus nanus
  - †Perchoerus probus – or unidentified comparable form
- Perognathus
  - †Perognathus brevidens
  - †Perognathus coquorum – or unidentified comparable form
  - †Perognathus trojectioansrum
- Peromyscus
- †Philotrox
  - †Philotrox condoni
- †Phlaocyon
  - †Phlaocyon minor
- Phrynosoma
  - †Phrynosoma douglassi
- †Planera
  - †Planera raynoldsi
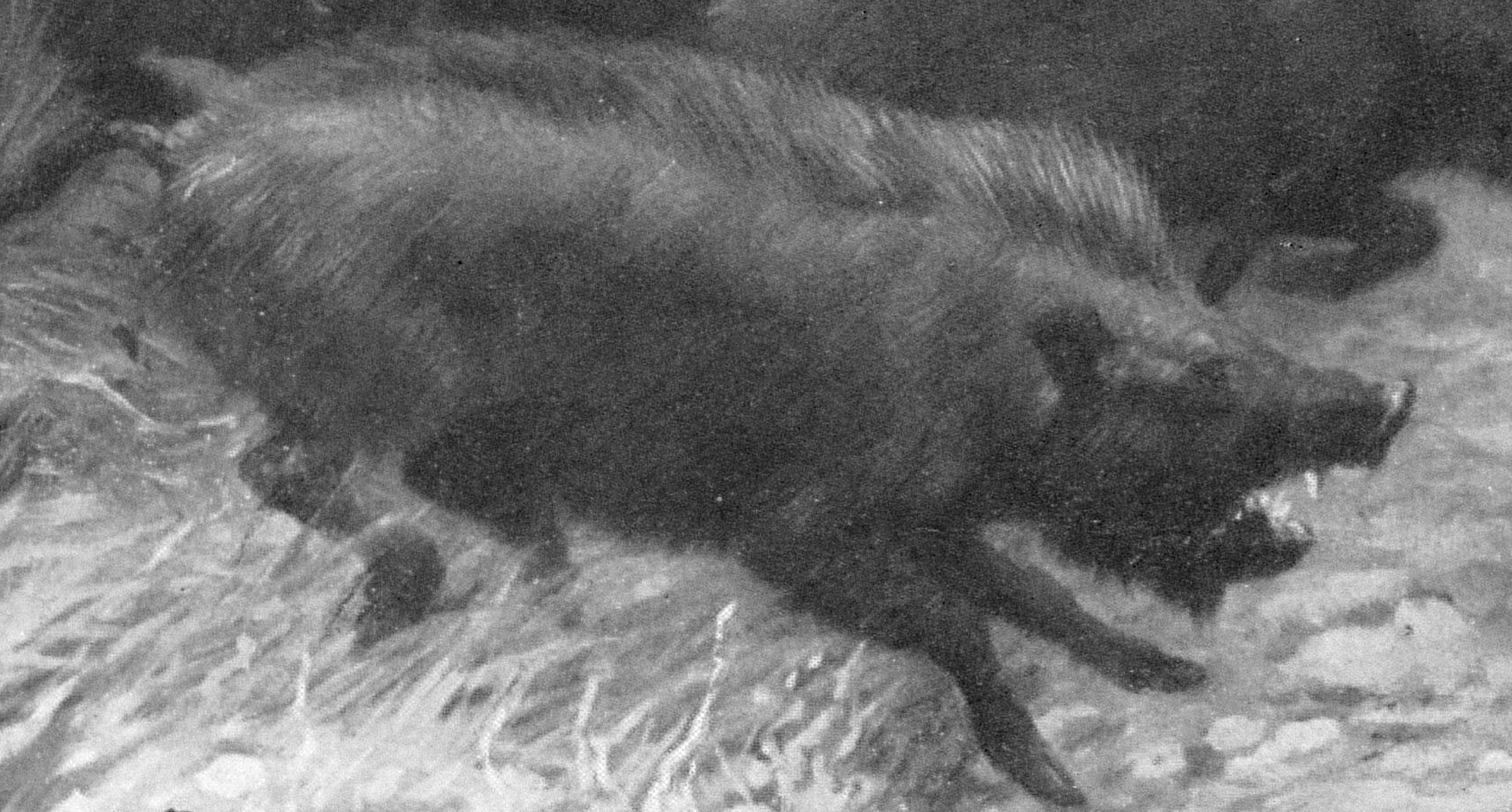
- Restoration of a herd of alarmed Miocene-Pleistocene peccaries of the genus Platygonus. Charles R. Knight (1922).
  †Platygonus
- †Plesiosorex
  - †Plesiosorex coloradensis
  - †Plesiosorex donroosai – type locality for species
- †Pleurolicus
  - †Pleurolicus clasoni
  - †Pleurolicus dakotensis – type locality for species
  - †Pleurolicus sulcifrons
- †Pliauchenia
  - †Pliauchenia magnifontis
- †Pliogale
  - †Pliogale manka
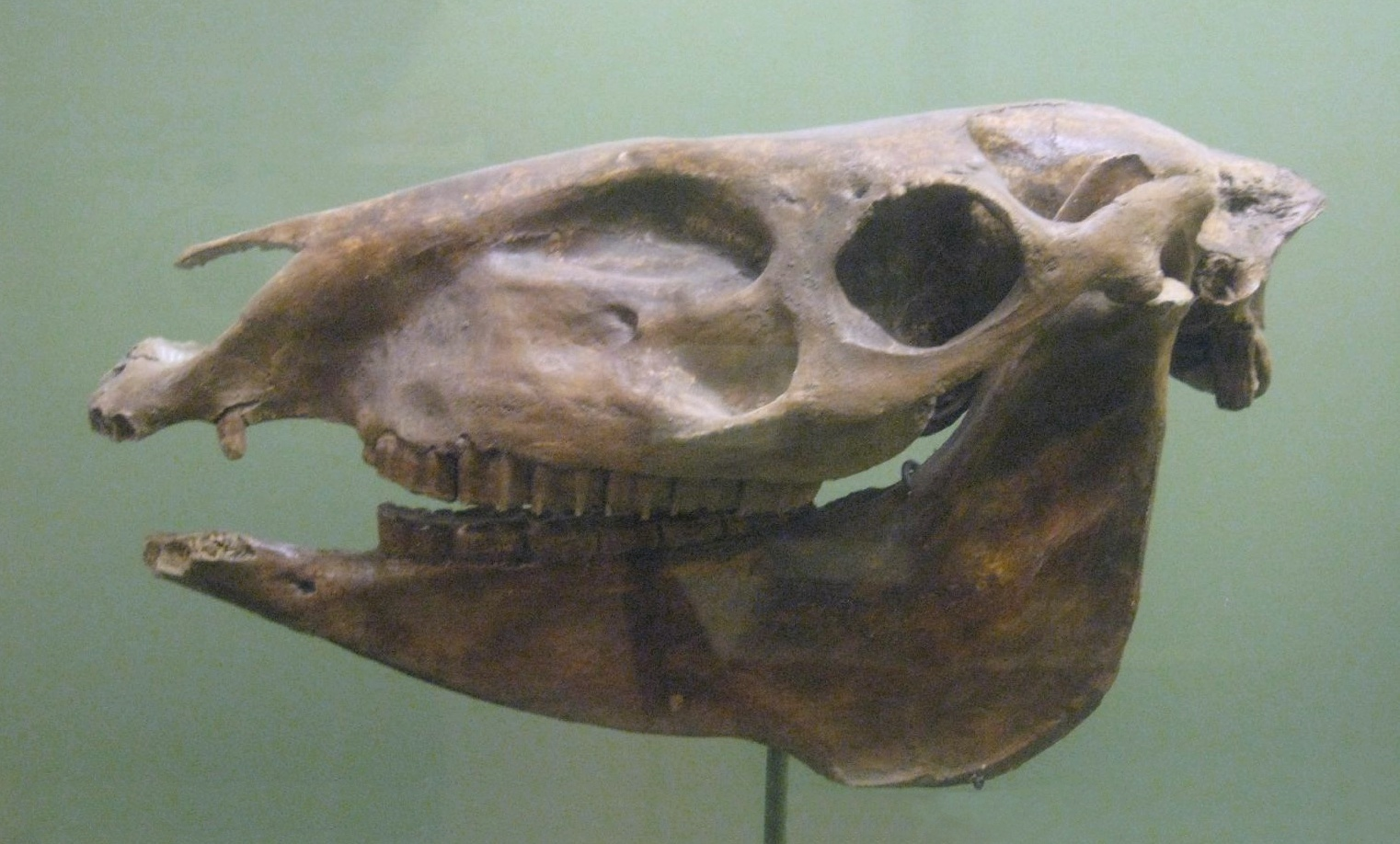
- Fossilized skull of the Miocene horse Pliohippus
  †Pliohippus
  - †Pliohippus pernix
- †Pliophenacomys
  - †Pliophenacomys osborni – or unidentified comparable form
- †Pliosaccomys
  - †Pliosaccomys dubius – or unidentified comparable form
- †Poebrotherium
  - †Poebrotherium wilsoni
- †Pogonodon
  - †Pogonodon brachyops
  - †Pogonodon cismontanus – type locality for species
  - †Pogonodon eileenae
- †Problastomeryx
  - †Problastomeryx primus
- †Procamelus
  - †Procamelus grandis
- †Procastoroides
  - †Procastoroides sweeti – or unidentified comparable form
- †Procrax – type locality for genus
  - †Procrax brevipes – type locality for species
- †Prodipodomys
  - †Prodipodomys idahoensis
- †Prodipoides
  - †Prodipoides dividerus
- †Proharrymys
  - †Proharrymys fedti – type locality for species
  - †Proharrymys schlaikjeri
  - †Proharrymys wahlerti
- †Proheteromys
  - †Proheteromys gremmelsi – type locality for species
  - †Proheteromys ironcloudi – type locality for species
  - †Proheteromys matthewi – type locality for species
- †Promartes
  - †Promartes gemmarosae
  - †Promartes lepidus – type locality for species
  - †Promartes olcotti
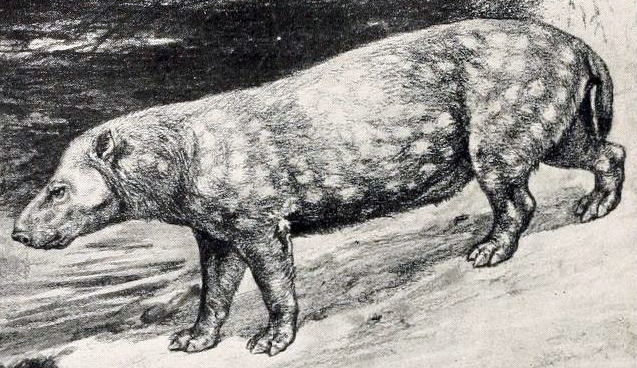
- Restoration of the Miocene hippopotamus-like oreodont Promerycochoerus both onshore and in the water. Robert Bruce Horsfall (1913).
  †Promerycochoerus
  - †Promerycochoerus carrikeri
  - †Promerycochoerus superbus
- †Promylagaulus
  - †Promylagaulus riggsi – type locality for species
- †Proscalops
  - †Proscalops evelynae – type locality for species
  - †Proscalops secundus
  - †Proscalops tertius
- †Prosciurus
  - †Prosciurus dawsonae
- †Prosthennops
  - †Prosthennops niobrarensis – or unidentified comparable form
- †Protapirus
  - †Protapirus obliquidens – type locality for species
  - †Protapirus simplex – type locality for species
- †Proterix
  - †Proterix bicuspis
  - †Proterix loomisi
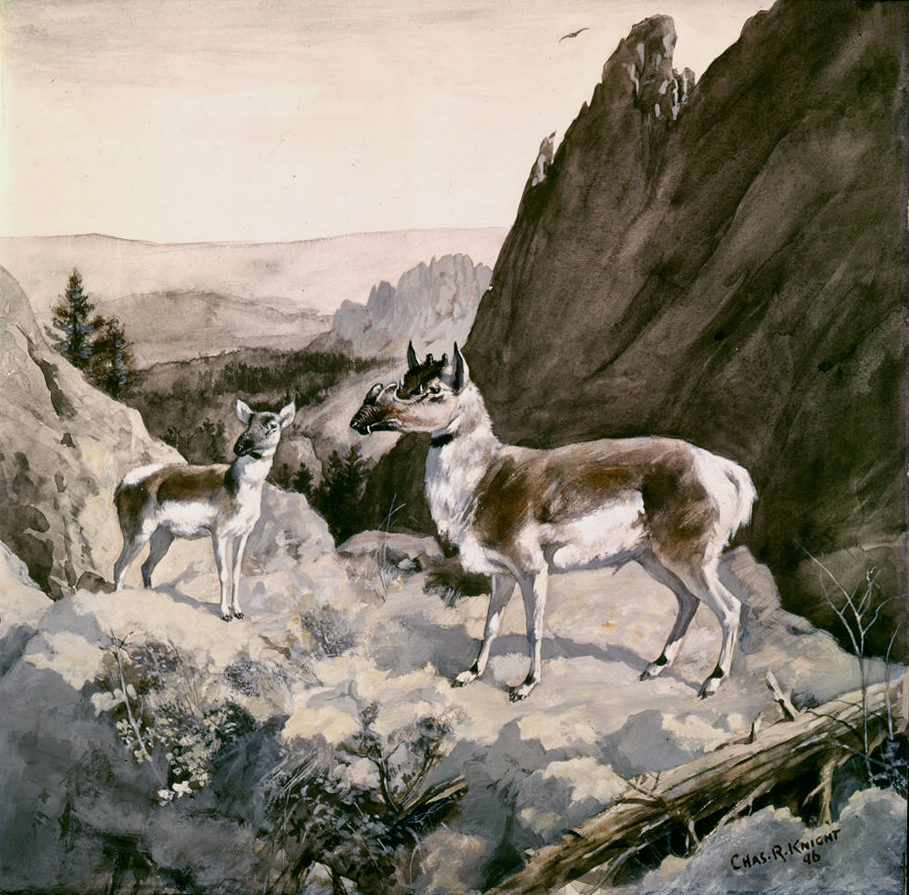
- Life restoration of a female (left) and male of the Oligocene-Miocene even-toed ungulate Protoceras. Charles R. Knight (1896).
  †Protoceras
  - †Protoceras celer
  - †Protoceras skinneri – type locality for species
- †Protohippus
  - †Protohippus supremus – type locality for species
- †Protolabis
  - †Protolabis heterodontus
- †Protospermophilus
- Pseudacris
  - †Pseudacris clarki – or unidentified comparable form
- †Pseudaelurus
- †Pseudhipparion
  - †Pseudhipparion gratum
  - †Pseudhipparion retrusum
- †Pseudoblastomeryx
  - †Pseudoblastomeryx advena
- †Pseudograptemys
  - †Pseudograptemys inornata – type locality for species
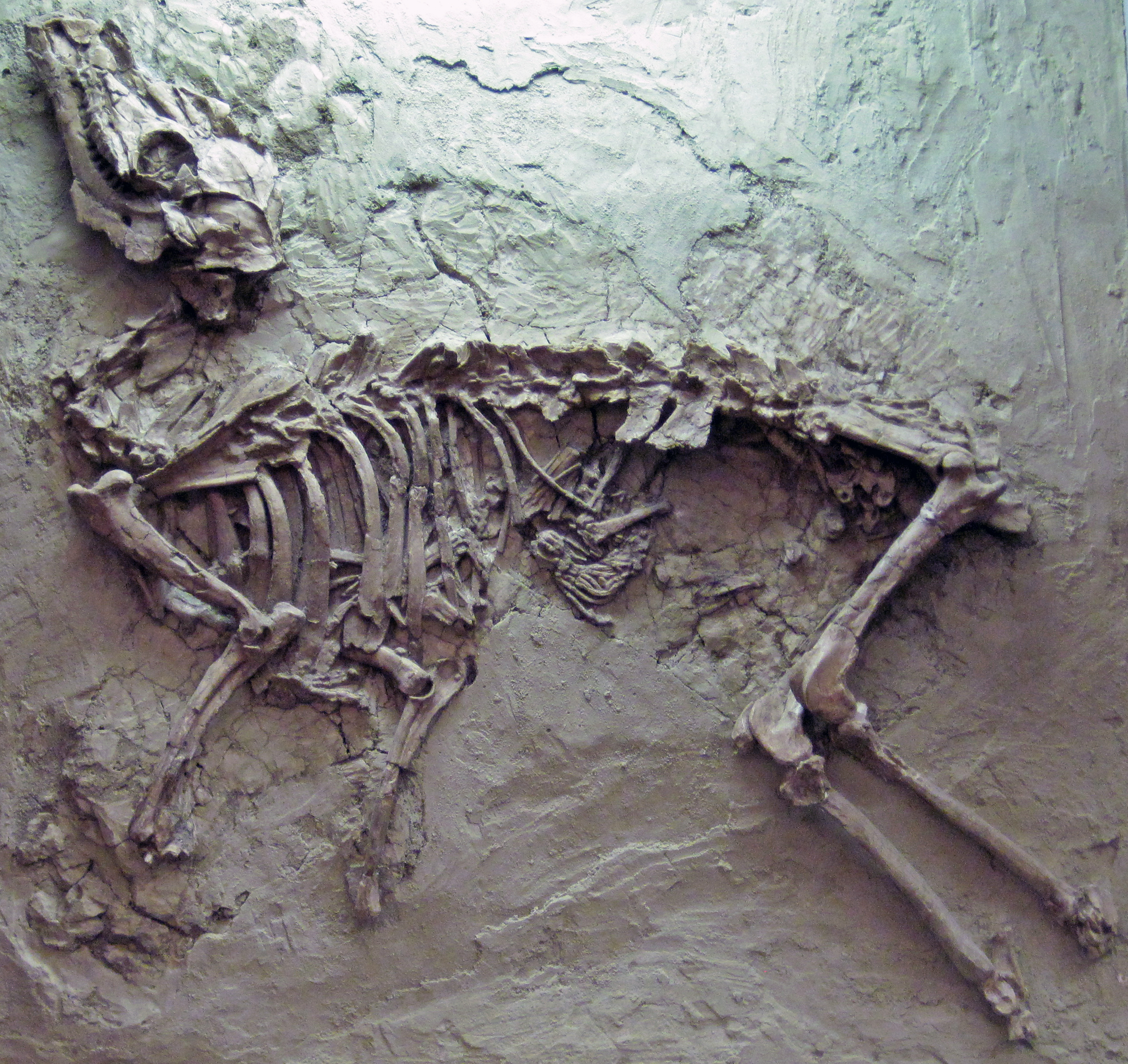
- Fossilized skeleton of the Eocene protoceratid mammal Pseudoprotoceras
  †Pseudoprotoceras
  - †Pseudoprotoceras longinaris
  - †Pseudoprotoceras minor
- †Pseudotheridomys
- †Pseudotrimylus
  - †Pseudotrimylus dakotensis
- †Pterogaulus
- †Pterygoboa – type locality for genus
  - †Pterygoboa miocenica – type locality for species

== Q ==
- †Quadrodens
  - †Quadrodens wilsoni – type locality for species
- Querquedula
  - †Querquedula integra – type locality for species

== R ==
- †Rana
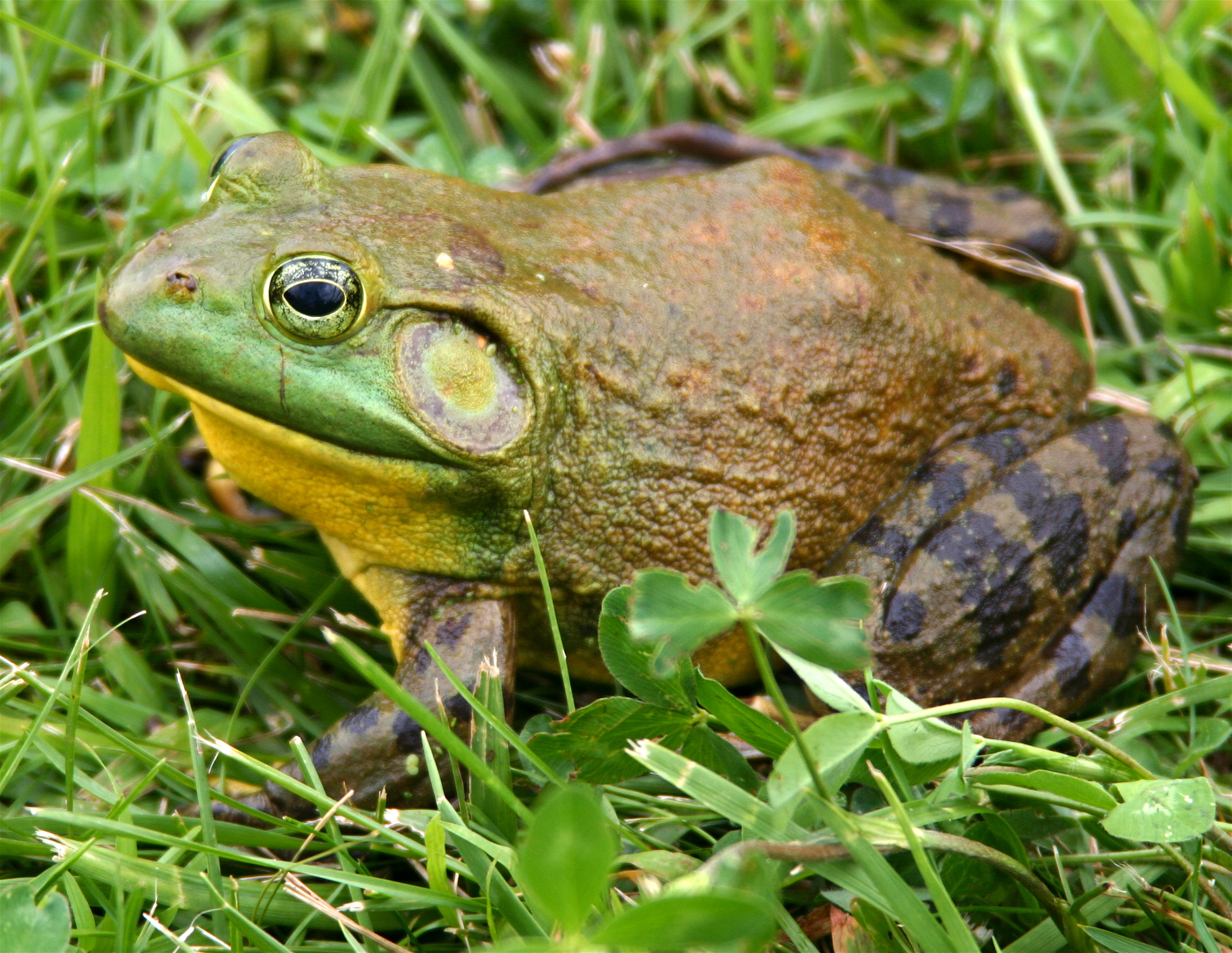
  - A living Rana catesbeiana (sometimes Lithobates catesbeianus), or American bullfrog
    †Rana catesbeiana
  - †Rana pipiens
- Reithrodontomys
  - †Reithrodontomys moorei
- Rhineura
  - †Rhineura hatcherii – type locality for species
  - †Rhineura sepultura – type locality for species
- †Russellagus
  - †Russellagus vonhofi – or unidentified comparable form

== S ==
- Salvadora
  - †Salvadora paleolineata
- †Sanctimus
  - †Sanctimus stuartae – type locality for species
- †Scalopoides
  - †Scalopoides isodens – or unidentified comparable form
- Scaphiopus
- †Scaptohyus
  - †Scaptohyus altidens – type locality for species
- †Schaubeumys
  - †Schaubeumys clivosus
  - †Schaubeumys galbreathi
  - †Schaubeumys grangeri – type locality for species
- †Schizodontomys
  - †Schizodontomys harkseni
- †Scottimus
  - †Scottimus exiguus
  - †Scottimus lophatus
- †Semotelus – tentative report
- †Sespia
  - †Sespia nitida – type locality for species
- †Sinclairella
  - †Sinclairella dakotensis
- Sorex
  - †Sorex cinereus
- Spea
  - †Spea neuter – type locality for species
- Spermophilus
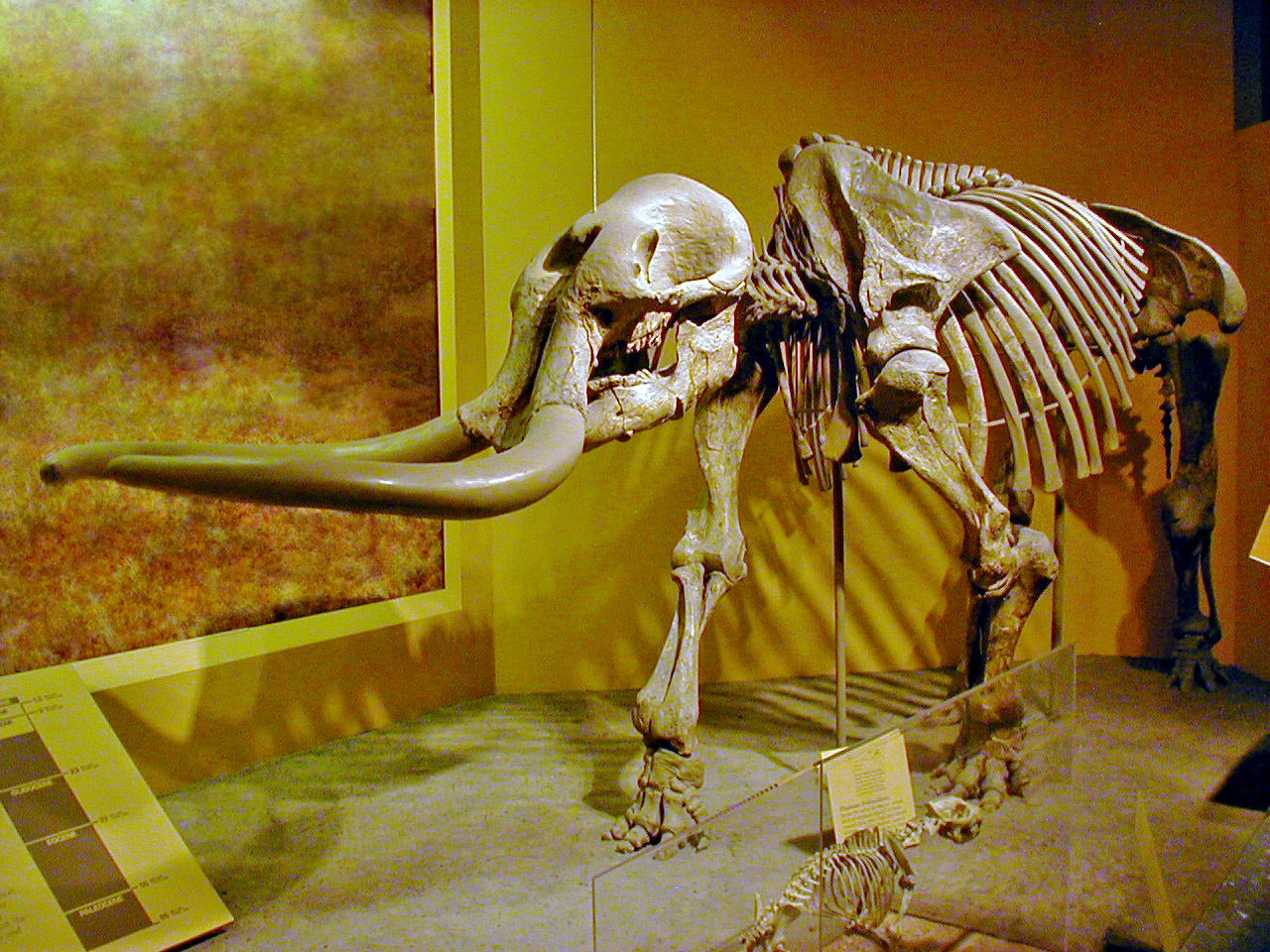
- Mounted fossilized skeleton of the Pliocene-Pleistocene elephant relative Stegomastodon
  †Stegomastodon
  - †Stegomastodon mirificus
- †Steneofiber
  - †Steneofiber fossor
  - †Steneofiber gradatus
- †Stibarus
  - †Stibarus obtusilobus
  - †Stibarus quadricuspis
- Strix
  - †Strix dakota – type locality for species
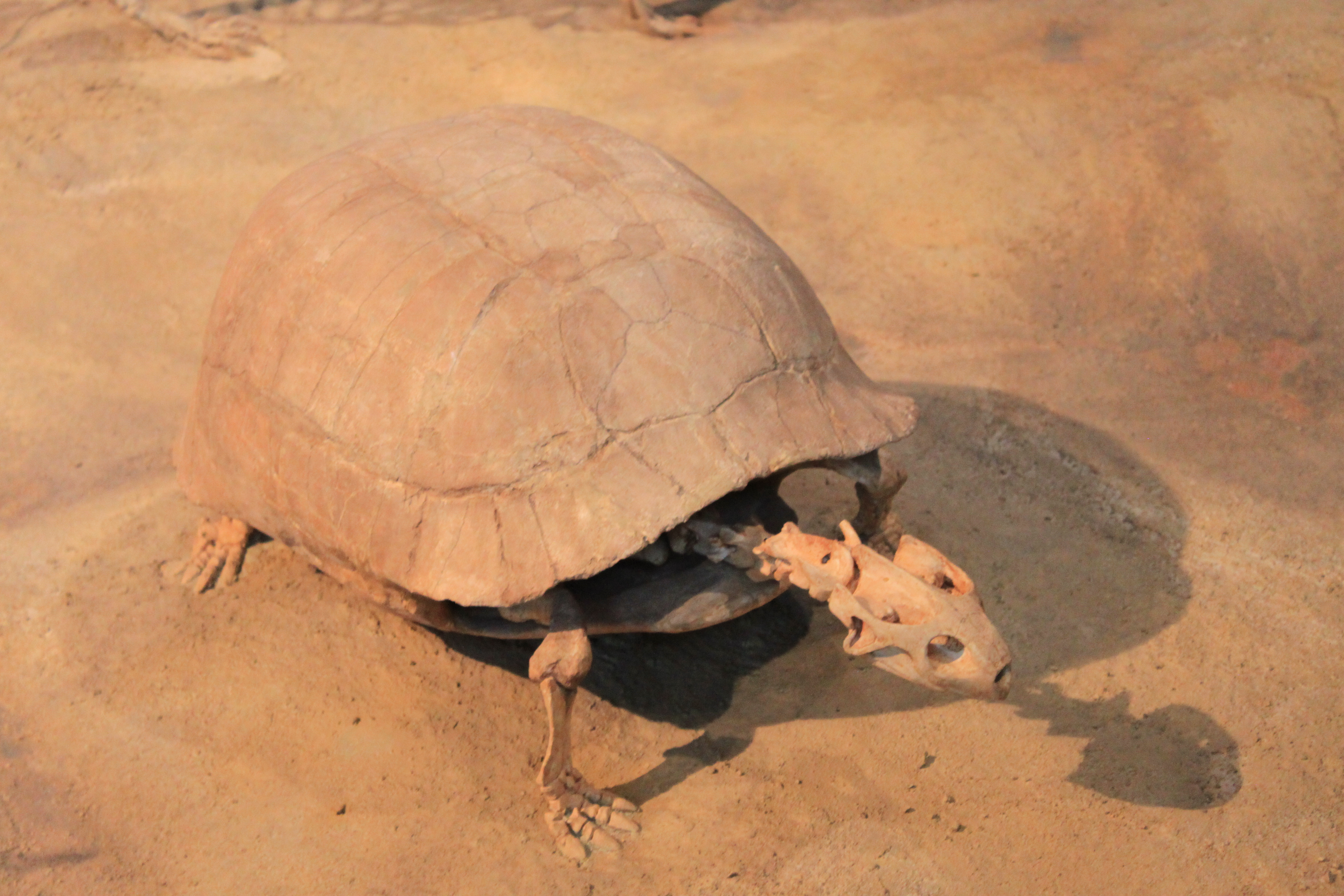
- Mounted fossilized skeleton of the Eocene-Oligocene tortoise Stylemys
  †Stylemys
  - †Stylemys nebrascensis
- †Subhyracodon
  - †Subhyracodon mitis
  - †Subhyracodon occidentalis
- †Sunkahetanka
  - †Sunkahetanka geringensis
- Sylvilagus
  - †Sylvilagus floridanus

== T ==
- Tapirus
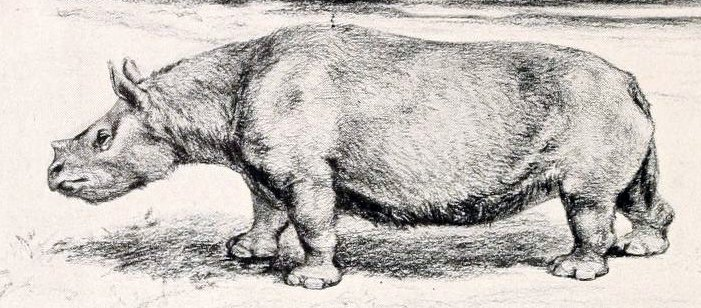
- Restoration of the Miocene-Pliocene rhinoceros Teleoceras
  †Teleoceras
  - †Teleoceras major
- †Teleodus – type locality for genus
  - †Teleodus avus – type locality for species
- †Temperocastor
  - †Temperocastor valentinensis
- †Tenudomys
  - †Tenudomys macdonaldi – type locality for species
- Thamnophis
  - †Thamnophis sirtalis
- †Thinohyus
- Thomomys
- †Tisisthenes
  - †Tisisthenes parvus
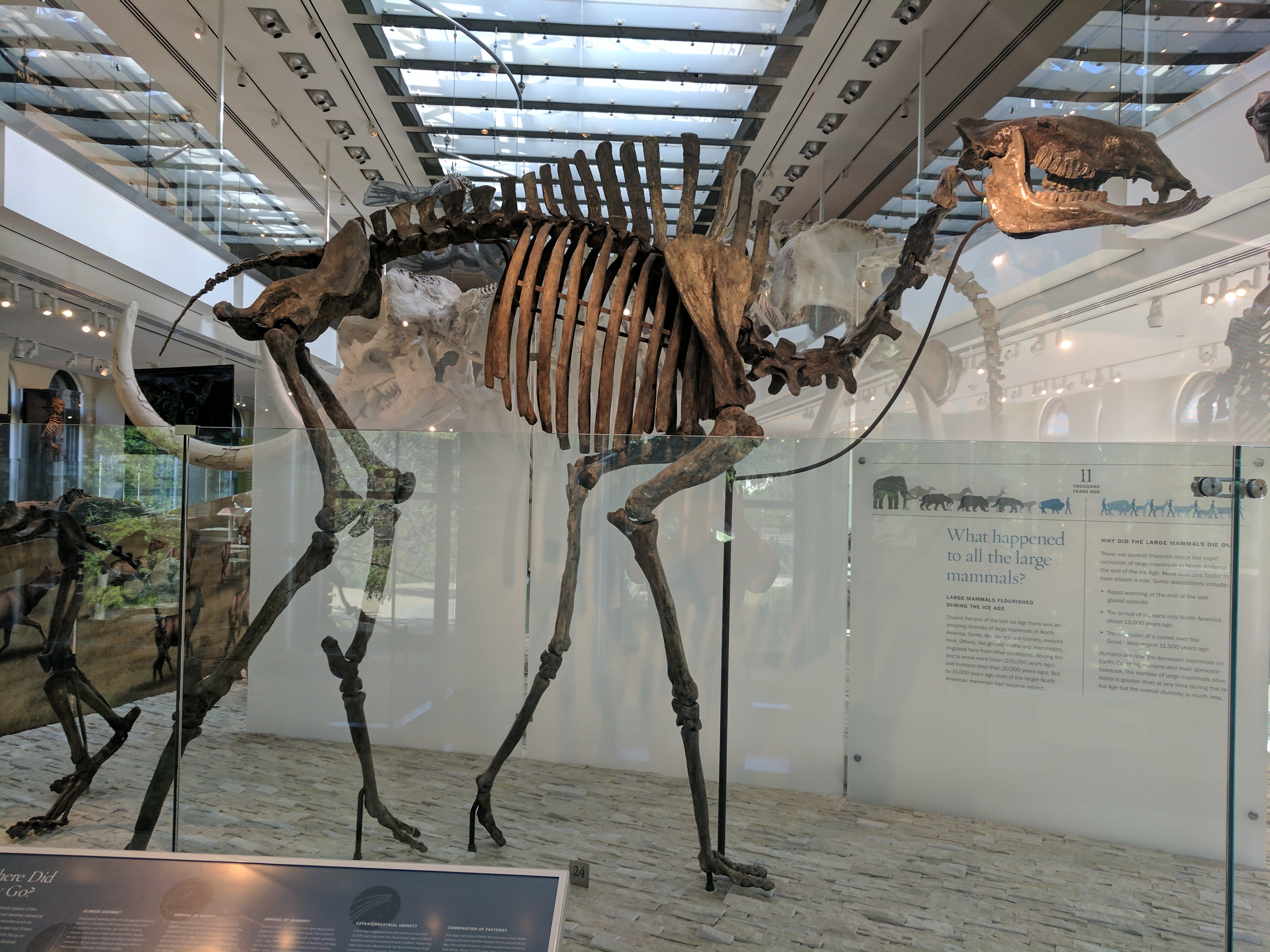
- Mounted fossilized skeleton of the Miocene-Pleistocene camel Titanotylopus
  †Titanotylopus
- †Trigenicus
  - †Trigenicus profectus
- †Trigonias
  - †Trigonias osborni
  - †Trigonias wellsi – type locality for species
- †Trilaccogaulus
  - †Trilaccogaulus ovatus
- †Triletes
  - †Triletes velus – type locality for species
- †Tylionomys
  - †Tylionomys woodi
- Tympanuchus
  - †Tympanuchus stirtoni – type locality for species
- †Tyrannomys
  - †Tyrannomys harkseni

== U ==
- †Ursavus
- †Ustatochoerus
  - †Ustatochoerus medius

== W ==
- †Wilsoneumys – tentative report
  - †Wilsoneumys planidens
- †Wilsonosorex
  - †Wilsonosorex bateslandensis
- †Woodoceras – type locality for genus
  - †Woodoceras brachyops – type locality for species

== X ==
- †Xenochelys
  - †Xenochelys formosa – type locality for species

== Z ==
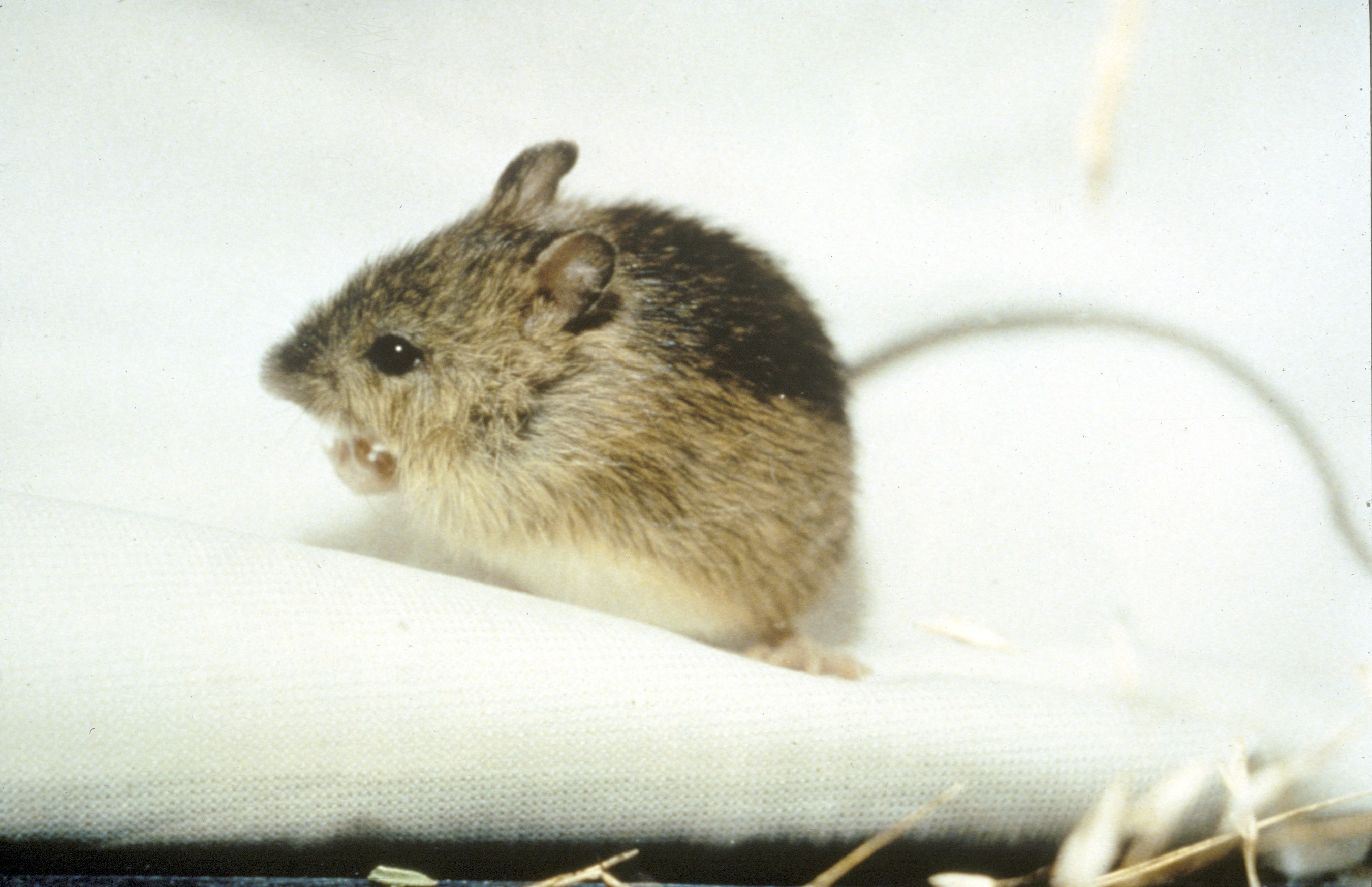
- A living Zapus jumping mouse
  Zapus
  - †Zapus sykesae
- Zelkova
  - †Zelkova planeroides
