= Megaleptictis =

Megaleptictis Temporal range: Late Eocene

Scientific classification
- Kingdom: Animalia
- Phylum: Chordata
- Class: Mammalia
- Order: †Leptictida
- Family: †Leptictidae
- Subfamily: †Leptictinae
- Genus: †Megaleptictis; Meehan & Martin, 2012

Species
- †M. altidens Meehan & Martin, 2012 (type)

Extinct genus of mammals

Megaleptictis (meaning "large Leptictis") is an extinct genus of large insectivore mammal from Late Paleogene (latest Eocene (Chadronian NALMA), but may be earliest Oligocene (Orellan NALMA)) deposits of Custer County, South Dakota. It is known from the holotype KUVP 2568 a nearly complete skull including the mandibles. It was collected in an 1894 University of Kansas expedition from the tan siltstone of the White River Group. It was first named by Tj Meehan and Larry D. Martin in 2011 and the type species is Megaleptictis altidens.
