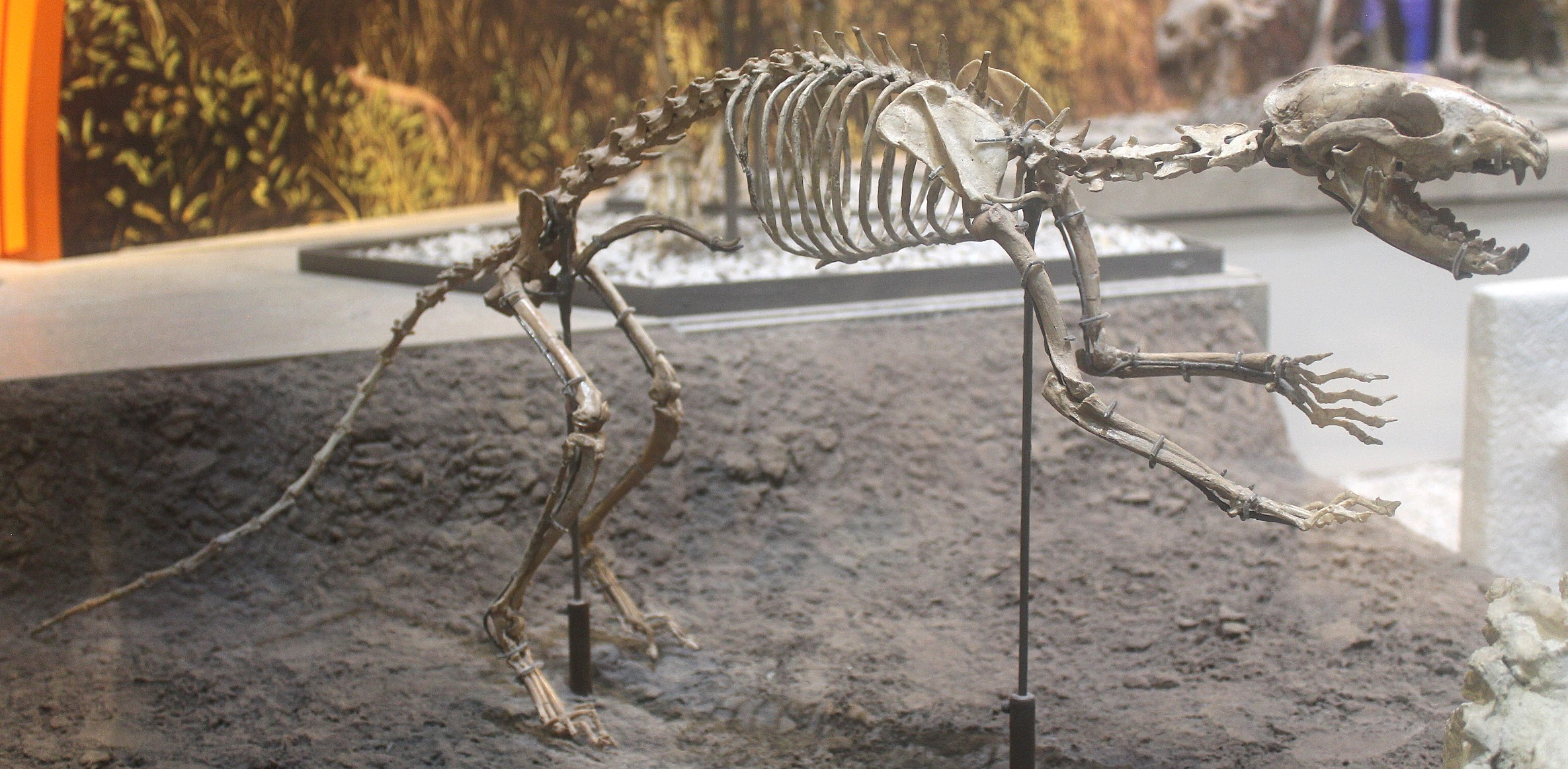
- Skeleton of H. gregarius at the Smithsonian National Museum of Natural History

Scientific classification
- Kingdom: Animalia
- Phylum: Chordata
- Class: Mammalia
- Order: Carnivora
- Family: Canidae
- Subfamily: †Hesperocyoninae
- Genus: †Hesperocyon; Scott, 1890

Type species
- Canis gregarius Cope, 1873

Species
- †H. coloradensis Wang 1994; †H. gregarius (Cope, 1873)

= Hesperocyon =

Hesperocyon Temporal range: Middle Eocene - Early Oligocene (Duchesnean - Whitneyan), 41–31 Ma

Extinct genus of carnivores

Hesperocyon is an extinct genus of early canids (mammals in the dog family) from the Middle Eocene to Early Oligocene of North America, from southern Canada to Colorado. Hesperocyon is the oldest canid in the fossil record, first appearing during the Duchesnean age (Middle Eocene, about 41 Ma) (AEO). It was one of the most common carnivorans of the White River fauna and survived up until the Whitneyan age (Early Oligocene, about 31.0 Ma). Hesperocyon is a probable ancestor to all later canids, and only Prohesperocyon has a more basal (earlier-branching) position on the canid family tree. Hesperocyon is the namesake of the extinct subfamily Hesperocyoninae, the first major radiation of canids.

Hesperocyon was a small, fox-sized canid which probably looked more like a civet or a small raccoon. Its body and tail are long and flexible, while its limbs are short. Still, the structure of its braincase and teeth show that it was a canid. It may have been an omnivore or mesocarnivore (a carnivore with plants as a notable portion of its diet). Unlike modern canids, Hesperocyon has five fully-developed fingers and toes. Its retractible claws are deep enough to suggest tree-climbing capabilities like the modern gray fox. The flexible forelimbs probably had a plantigrade posture, while the hindlimbs were probably semi-digitigrade with a wide stance.

== History ==
=== H. gregarius ===
Fossils now known as Hesperocyon have had a complicated history, with many different names at various points in time. Leidy (1856) named a jaw fragment from Nebraska as Amphicyon gracilis, unaware that name already had priority for a different carnivoran from Europe. Marsh (1871) described another Nebraskan jaw fragment as Amphicyon angustidens, supporting a close relation to Leidy's species. Cope (1873) named Canis gregarius for a few fragmentary fossils from Colorado. By 1884, Cope synonymized all of these species under one name, Galecynus gregarius, in the process superseding Leidy and Marsh's species names. Most paleontologists overlooked this takeover, and "gregarius" soon became well-established as the main species of early fossil canid on the Great Plains.

Scott (1890) named the new genus Hesperocyon for "Galecynus" gregarius, though most other studies at this time referred it to Cynodictis. Schlosser (1902) disputed its referral to Cynodictis, instead establishing the name "Pseudocynodictis", which remained popular through the early 20th century. Green (1952) finally cemented Hesperocyon gregarius as a valid name, combining Cope's species and Scott's genus. Wang (1994) followed up by establishing H. gregarius as the type species of Hesperocyon, as it is by far the most common and widespread species in the genus. He also clarified its type specimen, AMNH 5297a, which was one of the Coloradan fossils illustrated by Cope.

Hesperocyon gregarius is the most common fossil carnivoran in the White River Group, which extends across multiple states in the northern Great Plains: Colorado, Wyoming, Nebraska, and the Dakotas. These strata date to the Chadronian, Orellan, and Whitneyan North American land mammal ages (NALMAs), equivalent to the Late Eocene through Early Oligocene. It is also found in the Cypress Hills Formation of Saskatchewan and the Renova Formation of Montana. The oldest H. gregarius fossils are teeth from the Lac Pelletier local fauna, a Duchesnean-age site in the Cypress Hills Formation.

=== Other species ===
Matthew (1903) named "Cynodictis" paterculus for fossils from the Pipestone Springs local fauna, in the Renova Formation of Montana. Several 20th-century studies treated it as a valid species of Hesperocyon. Its supposed differences from H. gregarius are slight, including its older age (Chadronian) and a more strongly developed m2 tooth. Wang (1994) argued that H. paterculus is a synonym of H. gregarius, as their ages overlap and many Pipestone Springs fossils have smaller m2 teeth in line with H. gregarius.

Stock (1933) named "Pseudocynodictis" pavidus for fossils from the Arikareean-age Kew Quarry, in the Sespe Formation of California. Wang (1994) discussed this species, documenting a wider occurrence in the Orellan of Colorado and the Whitneyan of Nebraska and South Dakota. It is smaller and rarer than Hesperocyon gregarius and may be a close relative of borophagines, according to aspects of its molar teeth. Wang et al. (1999) later treated it as a species of Archaeocyon, the earliest diverging borophagine. The older Coloradan fossils are more similar to Hesperocyon, and may still be a separate species from either H. gregarius or A. pavidus.

Wang (1994) named Hesperocyon coloradensis for fossils from Orellan Colorado, the same area as the former "H. pavidus" fossils. Unlike "H. pavidus", H. coloradensis is about 18% larger than H. gregarius on average, with a thicker jaw and broader m1 tooth. This degree of size difference is probably outside the range of sexual dimorphism. Cope (1873) first identified the larger Coloradan fossils as Canis lippincottianus, but Wang noted that Cope's conception of lippincottianus is a chimera of multiple species: H. coloradensis, H. gregarius, and Daphoenus minimus.

== Anatomy ==
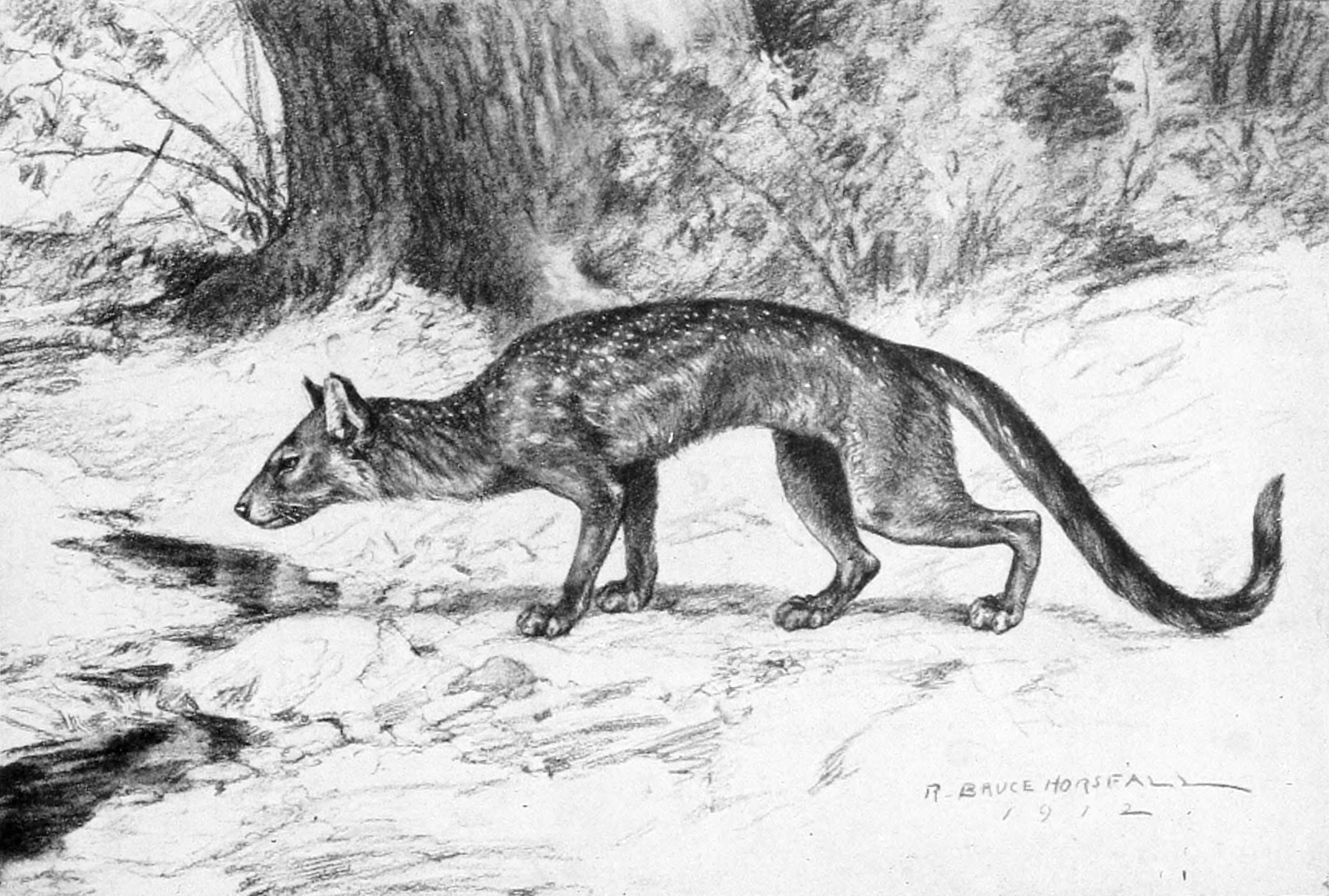
Life restoration of H. gregarius by Bruce Horsfall, 1912

Hesperocyon had an estimated weight of 1–2.9 kg (2.2–6.4 lb), or 2.35–2.75 kg (5.2–6.1 lb). It is similar in size to a kit fox, the smallest living canid in North America. Well-preserved skulls of H. gregarius range between 8.1–9.7 cm (3.2–3.8 in), while H. coloradensis has a skull length of 10.4 cm (4.1 in).

=== Skull ===
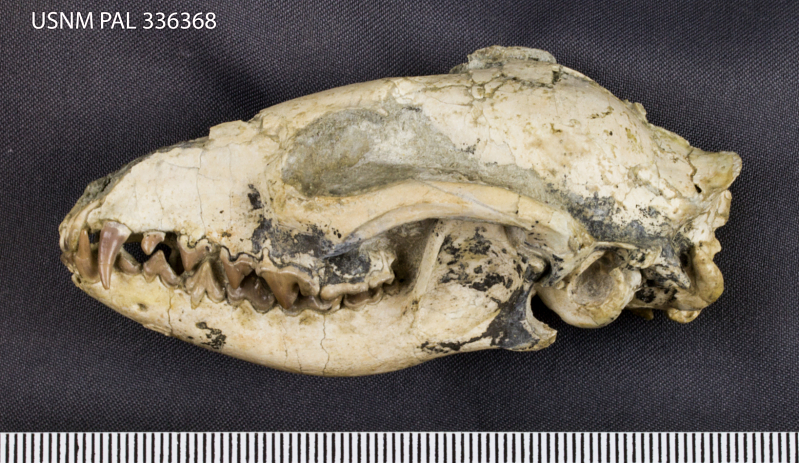
Skull of "H. paterculus" (= H. gregarius)

The skull of Hesperocyon is superficially similar to miacids, with a relatively short snout, bulbous braincase, slender zygomatic arch (cheekbones), and no frontal sinus. Upon closer inspection, the braincase reveals a combination of more derived and more primitive features.

Hesperocyon has ossified bullae (bony domes flooring the middle ear cavity), composed of an ectoympanic and enlarged entotympanic. Like other canids, there is a partial septum (internal wall) within the bulla. In the case of Hesperocyon, the septum is at the lower suture between the bulla's two components. Further canid features include a widened petrosal and an internal carotid artery which paths outside (rather than through) the bulla.

In other regards, the braincase is less derived than other canids. For example, H. gregarius has a small, tapering paroccipital process (a prong at the rear lower corner at the braincase) which projects straight back. In H. coloradensis and especially later canids, the paroccipital process hooks down and may expand or fuse to the bulla. The external auditory meatus (bony rim of the ear canal) is a simple hole rather than a deep tube.

==== Teeth ====
Lower jaw of H. gregarius

Hesperocyon has a dental formula of 3.1.4.2-33.1.4.2-3. The upper incisors are slightly tricuspid (with three-pointed tips), and the third incisor (I3) is larger than the other two. Each canine tooth has a sharp ridge on its rear edge. The first three upper premolars (P1-P3) are pointed blades, with a large main cusp. P2 and P3 may have one or two tiny additional cusps behind the main cusp, and these are better-developed in H. coloradensis than H. gregarius. The fourth upper premolar (P4) is a large carnassial tooth. Its protocone (front inner cusp) is smaller and shifted further back relative to Prohesperocyon and non-canids. The first upper molar (M1) of H. gregarius is more derived than Prohesperocyon in several respects: it is narrower, with a smaller parastyle (front outer extension), and the lingual cingulum (raised rim around the inner portion) is mostly restricted to the rear edge of the protocone. These derived traits are less pronounced in H. coloradensis. M2 is well-developed, but M3 is very small or absent. 93% of Hesperocyon specimens lack a third upper molar, compared to 100% of later canids.

The lower incisors are bicuspid (with two-pointed tips). The first lower molar (m1) is a carnassial which is narrower and less tall than in Prohesperocyon, and its metaconid (inner cusp) trends smaller in later specimens. The talonids (rear "heels" of m1-m2) have a prominent hypoconid cusp and low ridge-like entoconid. This seems to be an ancestral condition modified by later canids. Osbornodon, Borophaginae, and Caninae tend to have broader rimmed ("basined") talonids with a larger entoconid. In contrast, later hesperocyonines reduced the entoconid further, leaving the hypoconid as a narrow pointed hook. The third lower molar (m3) is small, with two cusps in total.

=== Forelimbs ===
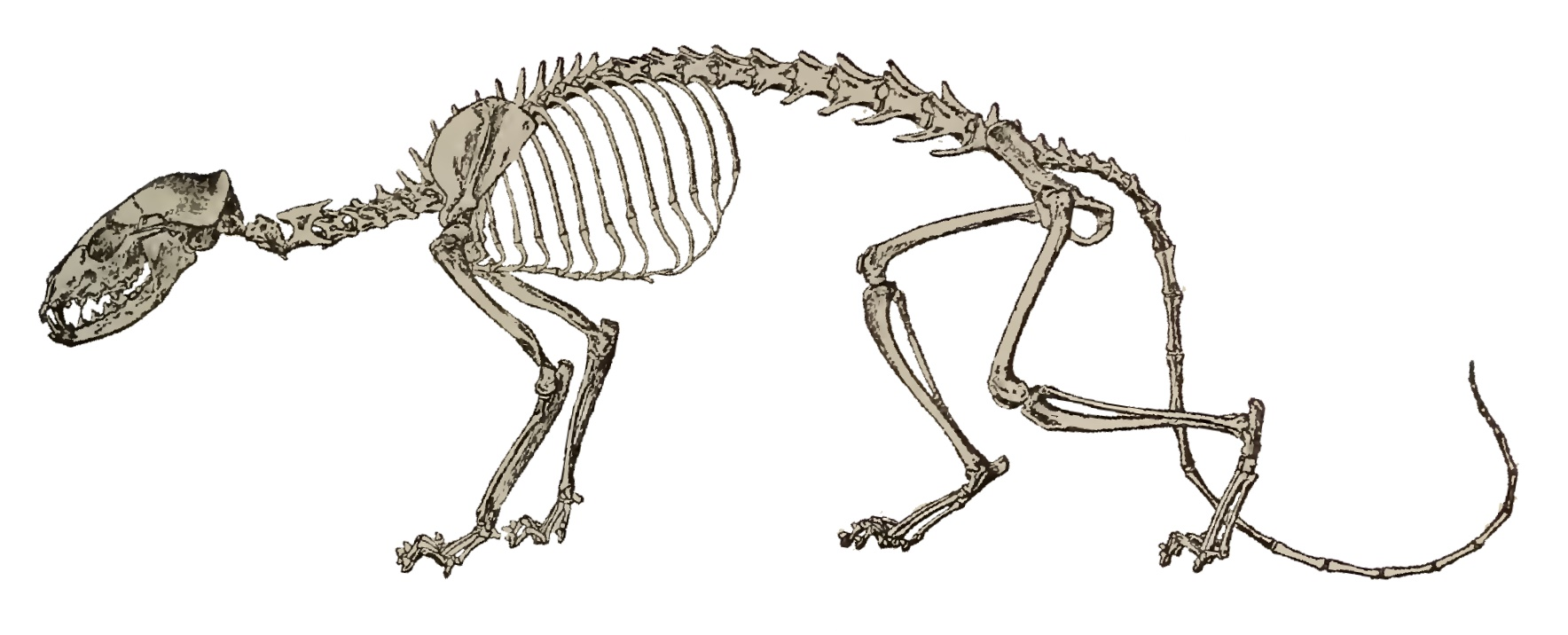
Skeletal diagram of H. gregarius

The forelimbs of Hesperocyon appear more flexible than later canids, and are more similar to partially arboreal mammals like the African palm civet. The scapula (shoulder blade) is smaller than modern canids, with an overhanging acromion, though it does share a knob-like projection above the shoulder joint. Unlike later canids, Hesperocyon still retains a small clavicle (collarbone), which allows for more side-to-side shoulder mobility.

The humerus (upper arm bone) has a rounded head, a low and boxy greater tubercle, and a large lesser tubercle. The deltoid crest extends halfway down the shaft of the humerus, providing better leverage in a plantigrade (palm-down) paw posture. Further down, the olecranon fossa is shallow, making the elbow joint rather loose. The ulna (inner forearm bone) is thick and bowed with the convex side forward, like arboreal carnivorans. It does not have the thick ligament grooves necessary to support a digitigrade (tip-toed) paw. The front paws have five functional digits, unlike living canids where the inner toe is reduced to a small dewclaw. Even so, the inner toe of Hesperocyon is shorter than the other four. Hesperocyon probably had retractable claws. The toes are arched, with a deep middle phalanx akin to cats. The claws are short, sharp hooks, similar to squirrel claws, and they lack the bony hood-like structure found in cats.

=== Hindlimbs ===
Skeleton of H. gregarius on display at the American Museum of Natural History

Compared to the forelimbs, the hindlimbs are somewhat closer to the anatomy and function of living canids. The left and right sides of the lower pelvis (hip) meet at a right angle, giving Hesperocyon a semi-sprawling hip posture akin to raccoons. Canines, on the other hand, have a nearly flat lower pelvis, enabling a much narrower stance. Hesperocyon has a very large, curved baculum (penis bone), three times longer than living canids of the same body size. In this regard it is also more similar to raccoons.

Compared to modern canids, the femur (thigh bone) has more condensed muscle attachments on its greater trochanter, though it does share a reduced third trochanter. Both Hesperocyon and modern canids have a deep groove for ligaments at the front lower part of the femur, above the knee. The tibia (shin bone), on the other hand, has shallower muscle and ligament attachments near the knee. Though the tibia's muscle scar pattern is close to plantigrade mammals, similar muscle scars are seen in the gray fox, which is digitigrade.

The ankle joint is shallow, like raccoons. Factoring in the ankle's set of bony knobs and ligaments grooves, the angle between tibia and ankle is less restricted than earlier miacids, but more restricted than later canids. This angle can splay up to 110° in Hesperocyon, while living canids can reach 150°. This is further support for a semi-digitigrade hindlimb, alongside a narrow calcaneum (heel bone) and closely-spaced metatarsals (foot bones). The five-toed hind paws are similar to the front paws.

== Taxonomy ==
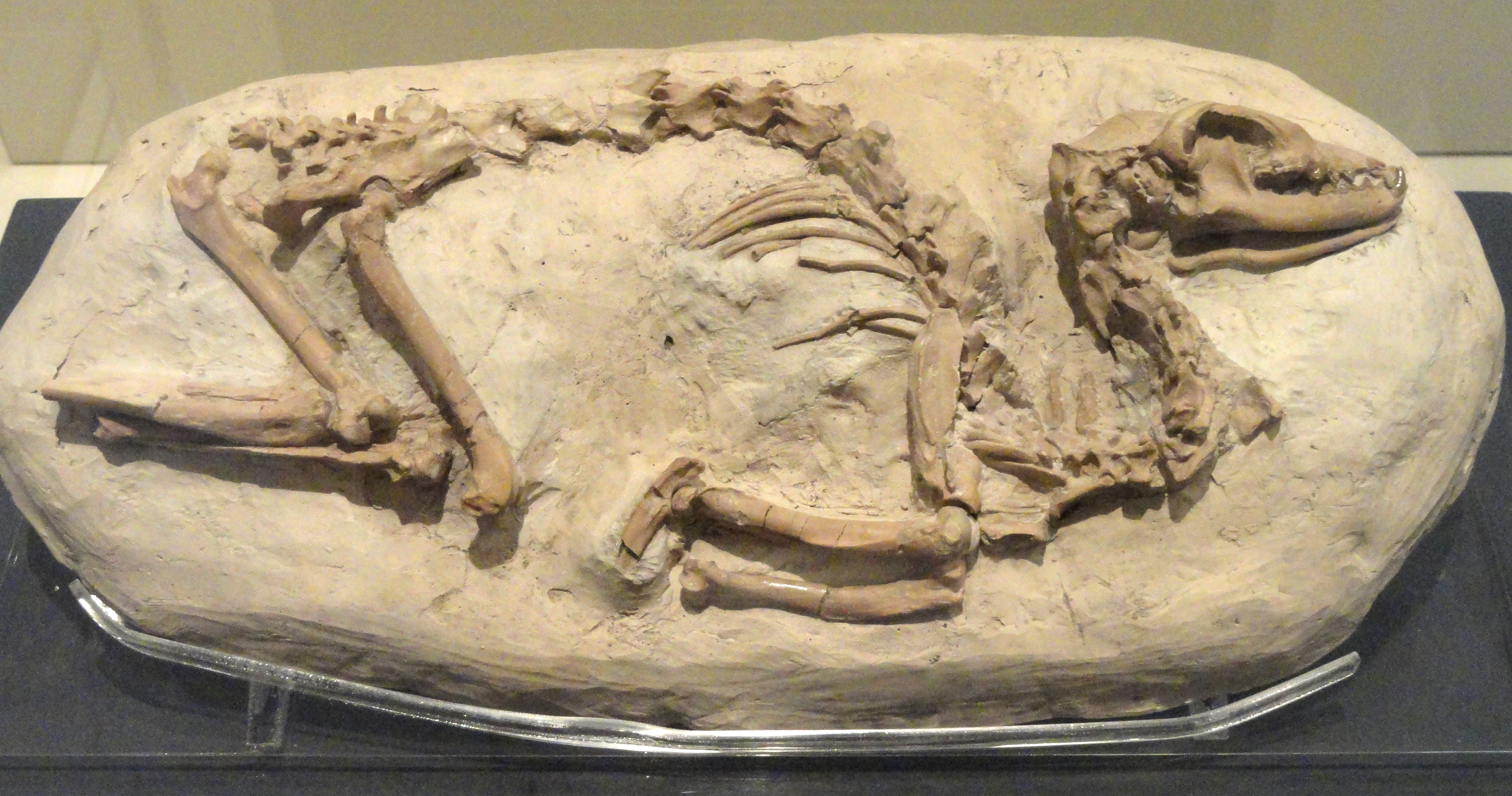
Skeleton of H. gregarius on display at the Royal Ontario Museum

Hesperocyon was one of the earliest of the canids to evolve after the Caniformia-Feliformia split around 42 million years ago. The oldest fossils of Hesperocyon are dated to the Duchesnean North American Land Mammal Age (NALMA). Hesperocyon is the earliest canid to appear in the fossil record, though Prohesperocyon has more "primitive" features and likely branched off of the canid family tree even earlier.

The extinct canid subfamily Hesperocyoninae probably arose out of Hesperocyon to become the first of the three major dog subfamilies, alongside Borophaginae (the extinct "bone-crushing dogs"), and Caninae, the subfamily which includes all living canids. Archaeocyon, the earliest borophagine, and Leptocyon, the earliest canine, each share some traits with Hesperocyon, and their respective subfamilies probably originated from a Hesperocyon-like ancestor.

Hesperocyonine contains 11 genera and over 20 known species. Wang (1994) arranged lines of descent between Hesperocyon and four other hesperocyonine genera: Ectopocynus (Whitneyan–Hemingfordian), Osbornodon (Orellan–Barstovian), Paraenhydrocyon (Whitneyan–Arikareean), and Mesocyon (Orellan–Arikareean). In turn, these four genera were considered ancestral to the rest of the hesperocyonines.

== Palaeobiology ==
=== Diet ===
Coprolites from the Pipestone Springs local fauna in Montana were probably produced by Hesperocyon gregarius. Small mammals and lizard fossils have been found in these coprolites, including remains of Palaeolagus temnodon (a relative of rabbits) and Ischyromys veterior (a rodent).

Elsewhere in western North America, Hesperocyon teeth are sometimes found in larger coprolites, showing that it was a food item for larger carnivores.

=== Palaeopathology ===
A number of individuals of Hesperocyon sp. have been found with evidence of hereditary osteochondroma, which manifested in the individuals as mushroom-like overgrowths of bone in the medial aspect of the distal half of their radii.
