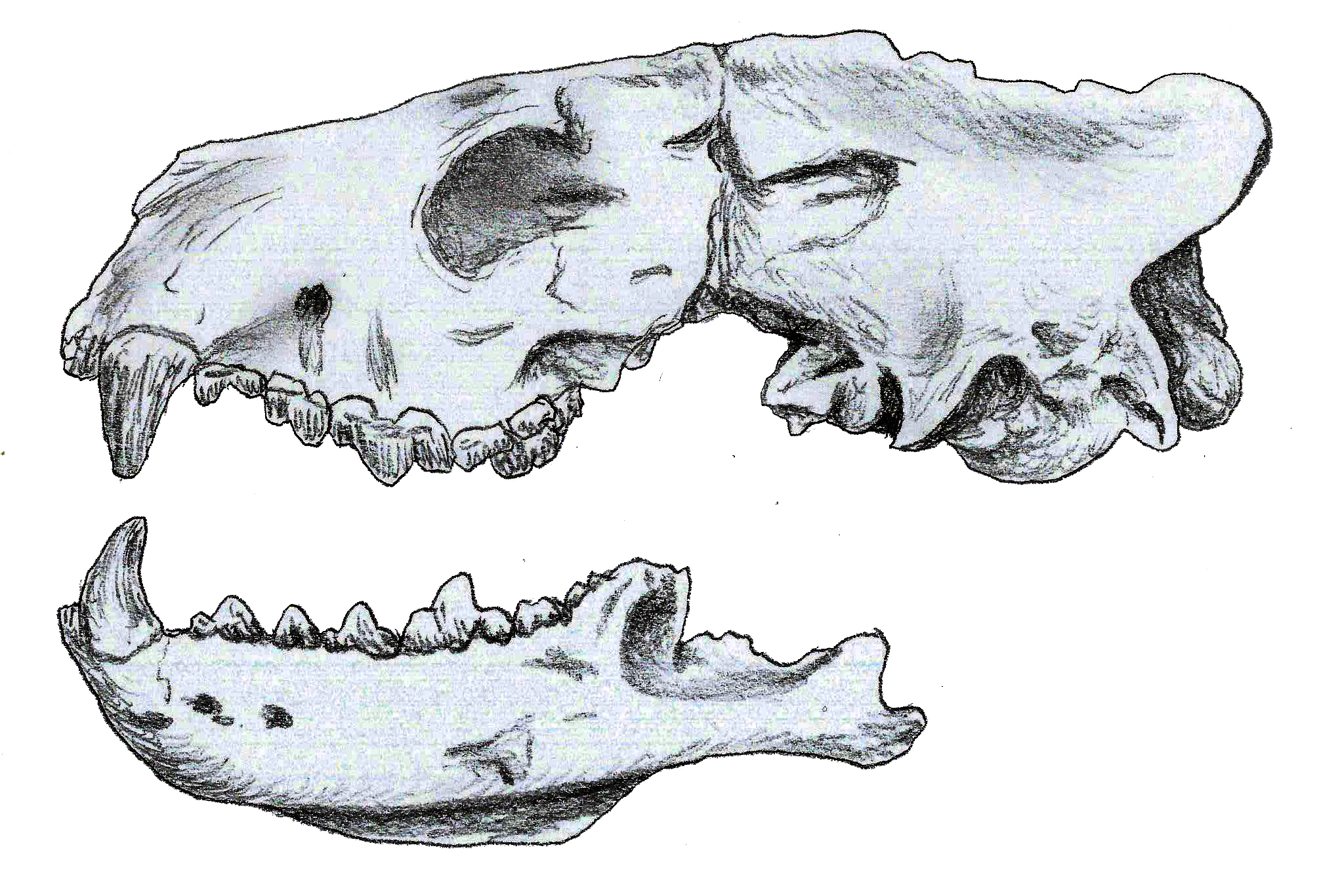
- Philotrox condoni

Scientific classification
- Domain: Eukaryota
- Kingdom: Animalia
- Phylum: Chordata
- Class: Mammalia
- Order: Carnivora
- Family: Canidae
- Subfamily: †Hesperocyoninae
- Genus: †Philotrox; Merriam, 1906
- Species: †P. condoni

Binomial name
- †Philotrox condoni Merriam, 1906

= Philotrox =

Philotrox Temporal range: Oligocene

Extinct genus of carnivores

Philotrox is an extinct monospecific genus of the Hesperocyoninae subfamily of early canids native to North America. It lived during the Oligocene, 30.8—26.3 Ma, existing for approximately 5 million years. In form, it was intermediate between the small Cynodesmus and the later Enhydrocyon, the first hypercarnivorous, "bone-cracking", canid.
