= Caedocyon =

Caedocyon Temporal range: Oligocene

Scientific classification
- Kingdom: Animalia
- Phylum: Chordata
- Class: Mammalia
- Order: Carnivora
- Family: Canidae
- Subfamily: †Hesperocyoninae
- Genus: †Caedocyon; Wang, 1994
- Species: †C. tedfordi

Binomial name
- †Caedocyon tedfordi Wang, 1994

Extinct genus of carnivores

Caedocyon ("fit for cutting dog") is an extinct monospecific genus of bone crushing canid which inhabited western North America during the Oligocene 30.8—20.6 Ma, existing for approximately 10.2 million years.

Like other members of the subfamily Hesperocyoninae, Caedocyon is a very primitive or apomorphic canid form, and its evolutionary position is not clear. It is, however, identified by having shortened upper premolars, enlarged caniniform upper third incisors, as well as reduced upper molars. Its simple, high premolars and the precision of its occlusion suggest a relation with Paraenhydrocyon. Known only from a single partial cranium, the dentition suggests the animal was a hypercarnivore or mesocarnivore.
