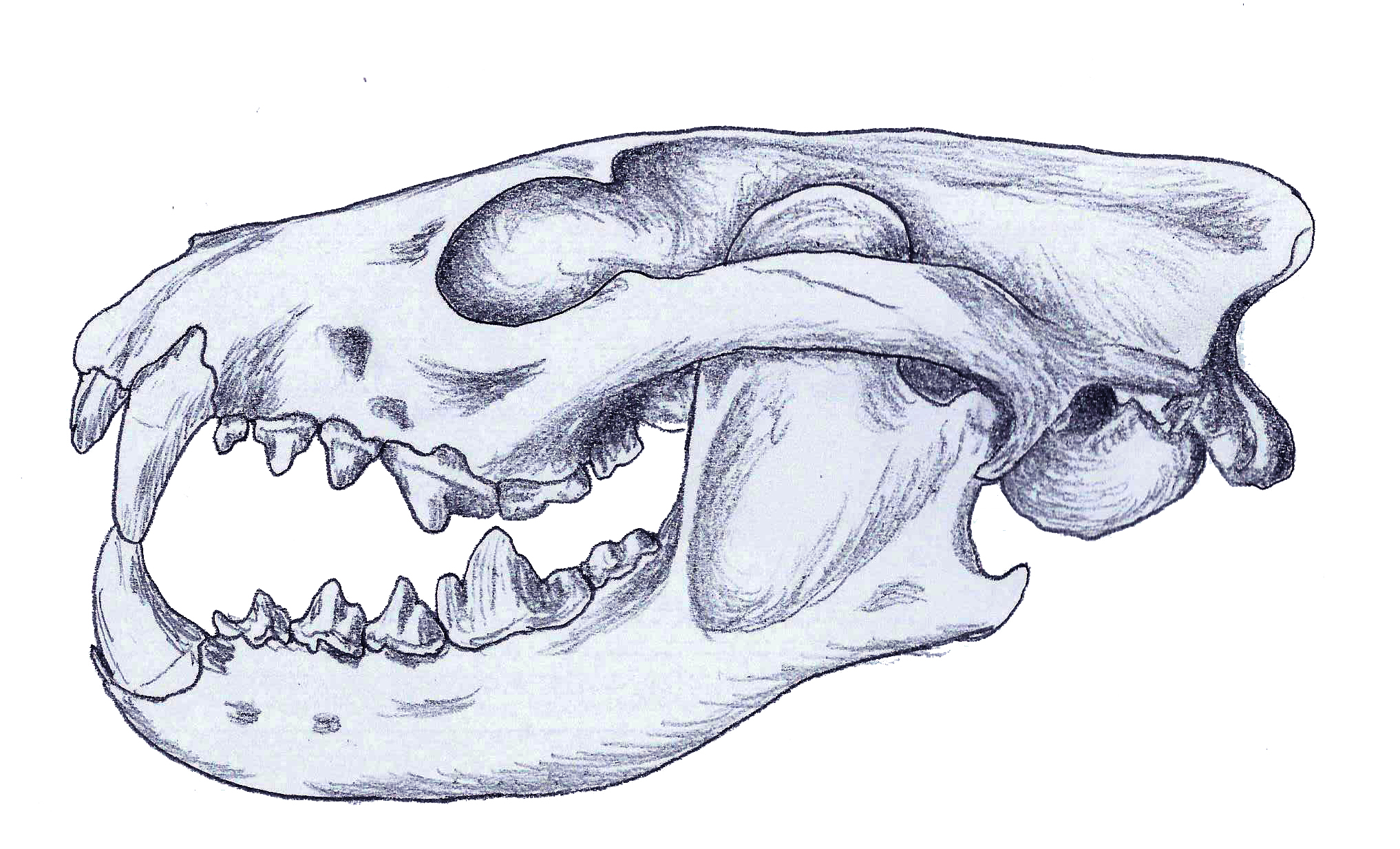
- Sunkahetanka geringensis

Scientific classification
- Domain: Eukaryota
- Kingdom: Animalia
- Phylum: Chordata
- Class: Mammalia
- Order: Carnivora
- Family: Canidae
- Subfamily: †Hesperocyoninae
- Genus: †Sunkahetanka; Macdonald, 1963
- Species: †S. geringensis

Binomial name
- †Sunkahetanka geringensis Barbour & Schultz, 1935

= Sunkahetanka =

Sunkahetanka Temporal range: Oligocene

Extinct genus of carnivores

Sunkahetanka is an extinct monospecific genus of the Hesperocyoninae subfamily of early canids native to North America. It lived during the Oligocene, 30.8—26.3 Ma, existing for approximately 5 million years. In form, it was intermediate between the small Cynodesmus and the later Enhydrocyon, the first hypercarnivorous, "bone-cracking", canid.
