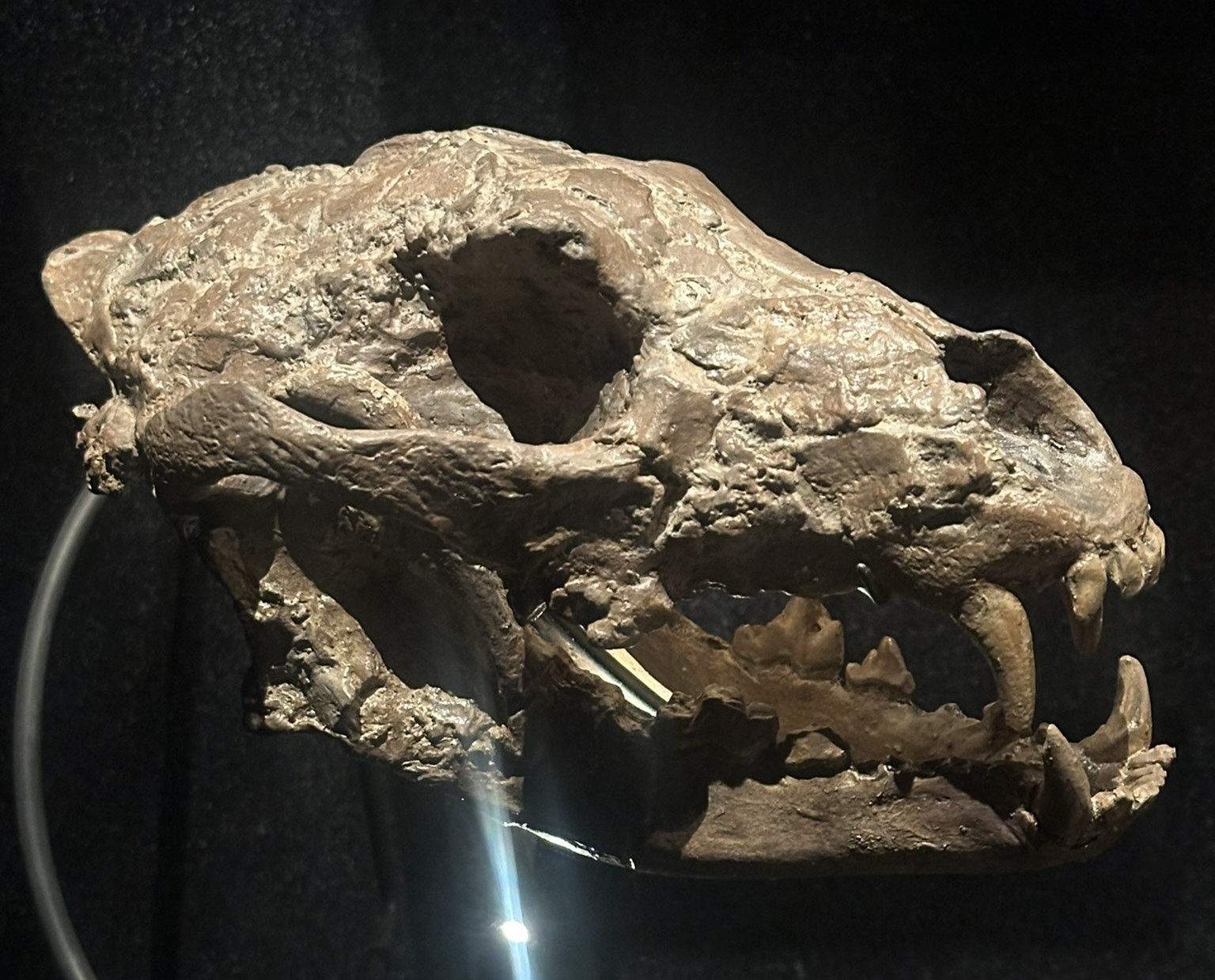
- Fossil skull cast, Florida Museum of Natural History

Scientific classification
- Domain: Eukaryota
- Kingdom: Animalia
- Phylum: Chordata
- Class: Mammalia
- Order: Carnivora
- Family: Canidae
- Genus: †Osbornodon
- Species: †O. iamonensis

Binomial name
- †Osbornodon iamonensis E.H. Sellards, 1916
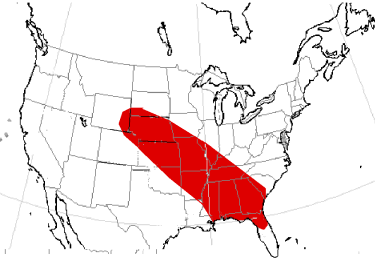
- Approximate range of Osbornodon iamonensis based on fossil distribution

= Osbornodon iamonensis =

Osbornodon iamonensis Temporal range: Oligocene–Early Miocene

Extinct species of carnivore

Osbornodon iamonensis is an extinct species of hesperocyonine, a predecessor of modern dogs that were endemic to North America and which lived from the Oligocene to Early Miocene epoch 23.6—16.3 Ma and existed for approximately 8 million years. It was named for Lake Iamonia in northern Florida. Fossils have been found in Florida and Nebraska. In the Thomas Farm Site in Gilchrist County, Florida, it is the most common carnivore found in that area.
