= Ectopocynus =

Ectopocynus Temporal range: Oligocene–Early Miocene

Scientific classification
- Kingdom: Animalia
- Phylum: Chordata
- Class: Mammalia
- Order: Carnivora
- Family: Canidae
- Subfamily: †Hesperocyoninae
- Genus: †Ectopocynus; Wang, 1994

Type species
- †Ectopocynus simplicidens

Species
- †E. antiquus Wang, 1994; †E. intermedius Wang, 1994; †E. simplicidens Wang, 1994

Extinct genus of carnivores

Ectopocynus ("strange dog") is an extinct genus of bone crushing canid which inhabited North America from the Oligocene to the Early Miocene. It lived from 33.3 to 16.0 Ma and existed for approximately 17.3 million years.

Remains of Ectopocynus are limited to mandibles and teeth only. These reveal that the animal had simple, robust, and blunt yet massive premolars and reduced or lost cusps on the lower molars. In this respect, Ectopocynus had many of the characteristics of Enhydrocyon. This dentition suggests this animal was a hypercarnivore or mesocarnivore.
