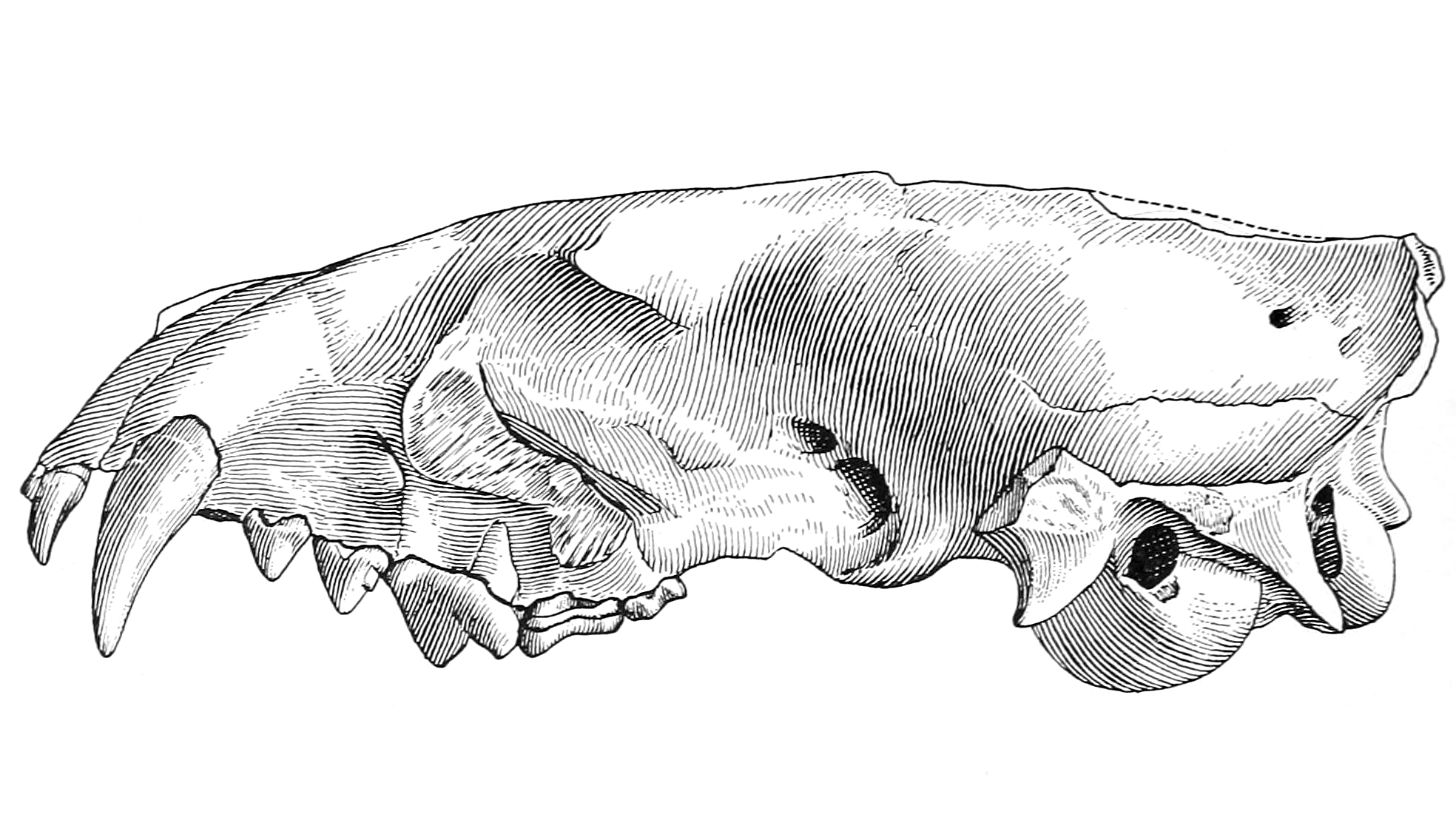
- Skull of Paraenhydrocyon josephi

Scientific classification
- Kingdom: Animalia
- Phylum: Chordata
- Class: Mammalia
- Order: Carnivora
- Family: Canidae
- Subfamily: †Hesperocyoninae
- Genus: †Paraenhydrocyon; Wang, 1994

Type species
- †Temnocyon wallovianus

Species
- †P. robustus Cope 1881; †P. josephi Matthew 1907; †P. wallovianus Cope 1881

= Paraenhydrocyon =

Paraenhydrocyon Temporal range: Early Miocene

Extinct genus of carnivores

Paraenhydrocyon ("beside Enhydrocyon") is an extinct genus of bone crushing omnivorous early canid which inhabited North America during the Early Miocene, 24.8—20.4 Ma, existing for approximately 5 million years.

== Description ==
In addition to its retention of several primitive cranial characters, this includes unique sharp-tipped, slender premolars that clearly contrast with the strong premolars of the Mesocyon–Enhydrocyon group, but also parallels that clade by having a reduced metaconid cusp on the lower molars.

== Palaeobiology ==
=== Diet ===
The dentition suggests that this animal was a hypercarnivore or mesocarnivore.
