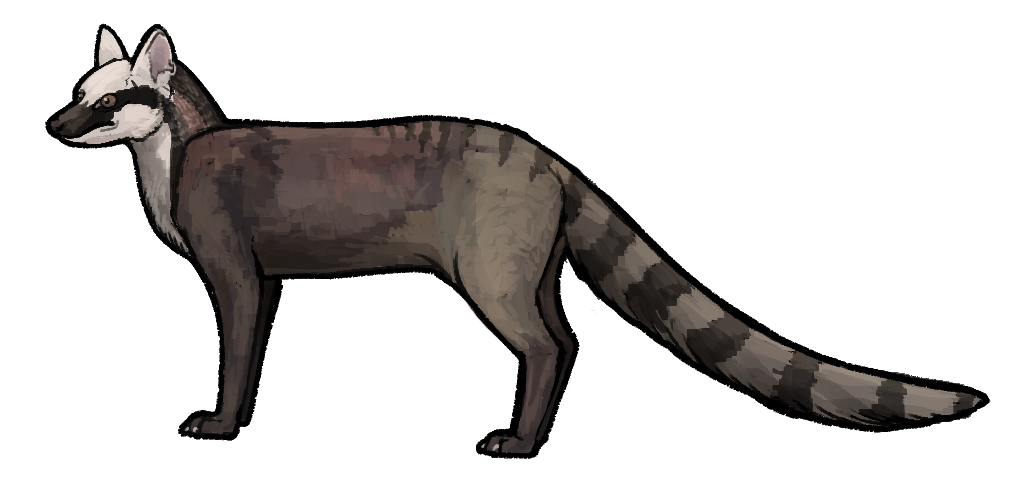
- Restoration of Prohesperocyon wilsoni

Scientific classification
- Kingdom: Animalia
- Phylum: Chordata
- Class: Mammalia
- Order: Carnivora
- Family: Canidae
- Genus: †Prohesperocyon; Wang, 1994
- Species: †P. wilsoni

Binomial name
- †Prohesperocyon wilsoni Gustafson, 1986

= Prohesperocyon =

Prohesperocyon Temporal range: Late Eocene, 36.6–36.5 Ma

Extinct genus of carnivores

Prohesperocyon ("before Hesperocyon") is an extinct genus of canid, endemic to North America appearing during the Late Eocene around 36.6 mya (AEO).

== Fossil distribution ==
Prohesperocyon wilsoni was unearthed at the Airstrip (TMM 40504) site, Presidio County, Texas dating between 36.6 and 36.5 million years ago. This fossil species bears a combination of features that definitively mark it as a Canidae, including teeth that include the loss of the upper third molar (a general trend in canids toward a more shearing bite), and the characteristically enlarged bony bulla (the rounded covering over the middle ear). Based on what we know about its descendants, Prohesperocyon likely had slightly more elongated limbs than its predecessors, along with toes that were parallel and closely touching, rather than splayed, as in bears.
