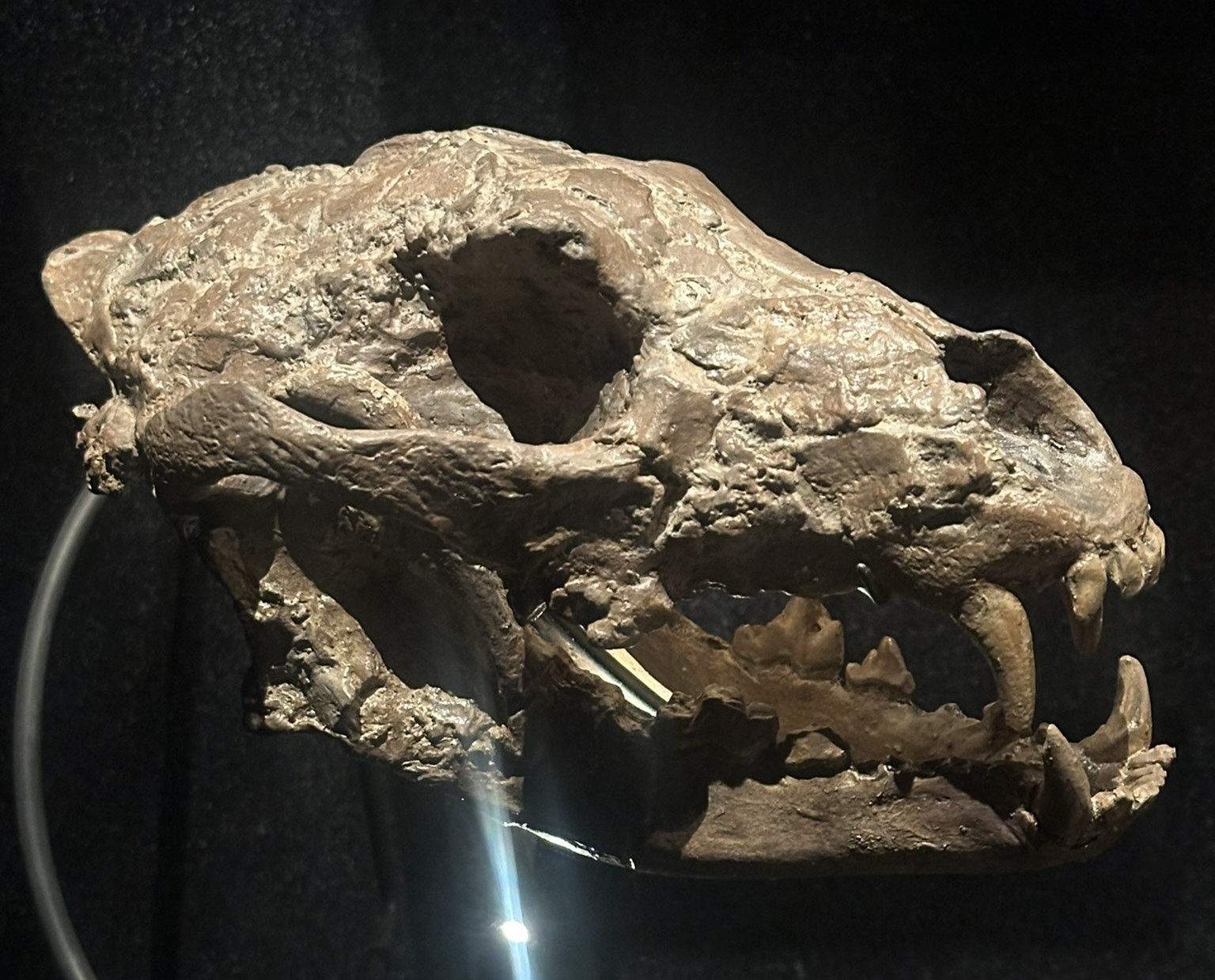
- Fossil skull cast of O. iamonensis, Florida Museum of Natural History

Scientific classification
- Kingdom: Animalia
- Phylum: Chordata
- Class: Mammalia
- Order: Carnivora
- Family: Canidae
- Subfamily: †Hesperocyoninae
- Genus: †Osbornodon; Wang, 1994

Type species
- †Osbornodon fricki

Species
- See text
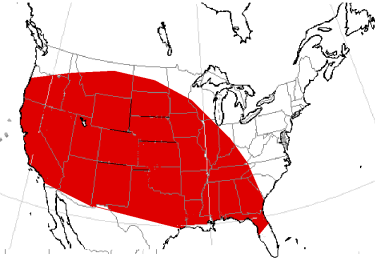
- Approximate range of Osbornodon based on fossil distribution

= Osbornodon =

Osbornodon Temporal range: Early Oligocene–Early Miocene

Genus of canid

Osbornodon ("Osborn's tooth") is an extinct genus of canid that were endemic to North America and which lived from the Oligocene to the Early Miocene, 33.9—15.97 Ma (AEO), existing for approximately 18 million years. It was the last surviving genus of the hesperocyonine subfamily, the oldest subfamily of canids. The genus is named for Henry Fairfield Osborn.

== Species ==
Seven known species of Osbornodon existed:

- Osbornodon brachypus Cope 1881
- Osbornodon fricki Wang 1994 (18 Ma)
- Osbornodon iamonensis Sellards 1916 (21 Ma)
- Osbornodon renjiei Wang 1994 (33 Ma)
- Osbornodon sesnoni Macdonald 1967 (32 Ma)
- Osbornodon scitulus Hay 1924
- Osbornodon wangi Hayes 2000

The earlier species were about the size of a small fox, and had teeth suggesting an omnivorous or hypocarnivorous diet. Later species were larger and more actively predaceous. The last species, O. fricki, was about the size of a large wolf.
