= Violet gland =

Gland on the tail of certain mammals

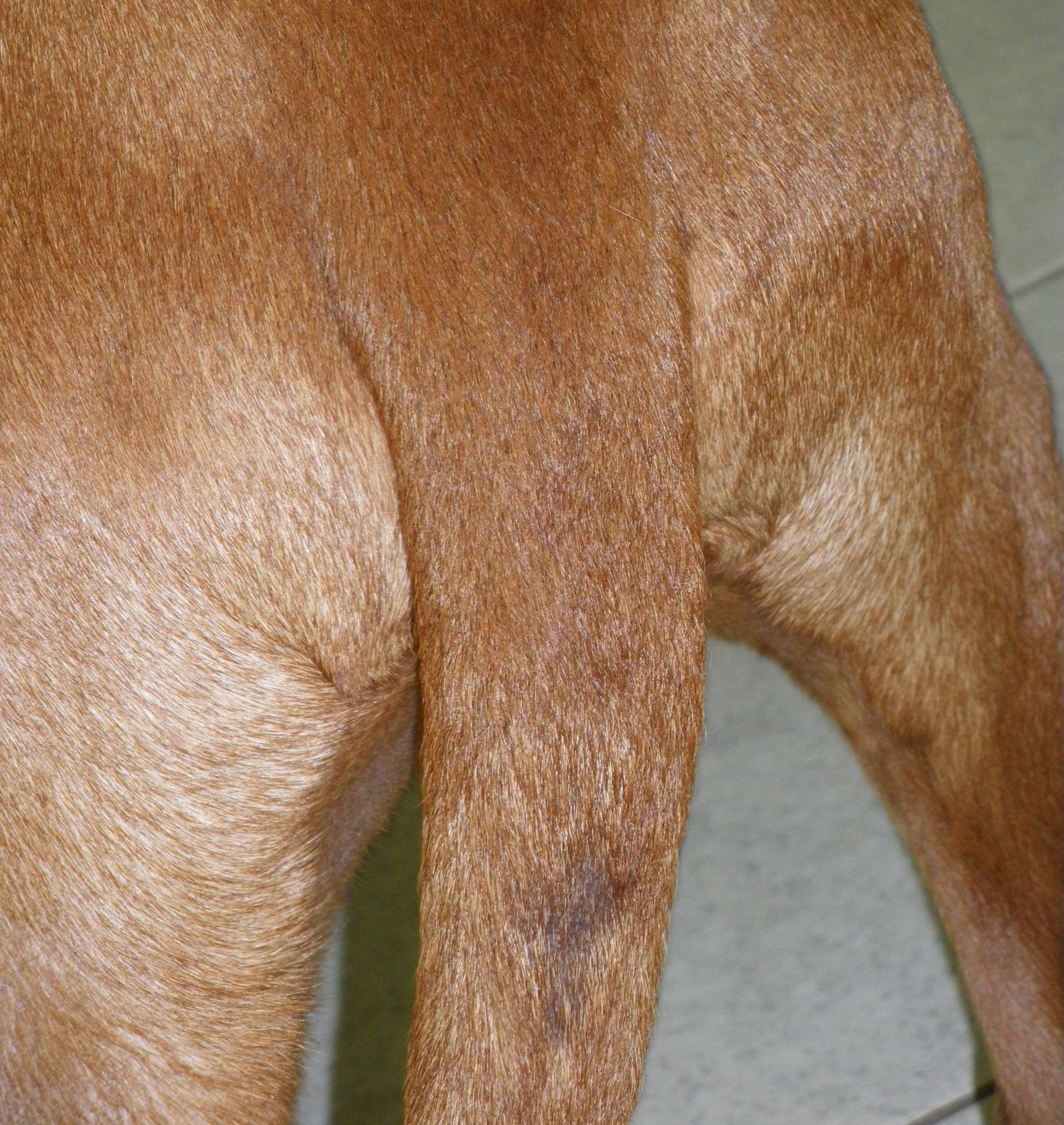
A Rhodesian Ridgeback (sex unknown) with "stud tail": the violet gland lost hair and appears as a dark dimple

The violet gland or supracaudal gland is a gland located on the upper surface of the tail of certain mammals, including European badgers and canids such as foxes, wolves, and the domestic dog, as well as the domestic cat. Like many other mammalian secretion glands, the violet gland consists of modified sweat glands and sebaceous glands.

It is used for intra-species signalling, scent marking, and contributes to the strong odor of foxes in particular. Although it secretes a mixture of volatile terpenes similar to those produced by violets (hence the name), the chemicals are produced in much greater quantity than in flowers, and the resulting strong smell can be quite unpleasant.

== By species ==
In dogs, the violet or supracaudal gland is found approximately above the 9th caudal vertebra, but depending on breed it may be vestigial or entirely absent. The violet gland secretes protein and hydrophobic lipids, has wide excretory ducts, is connected with coarse hairs, devoid of cysts, and has no sexual dimorphism. In the dog and cat fancy it is often referred to as "stud tail", despite the fact that it occurs in both sexes, not just breeding males. However, for reasons still unknown the hair at a dog's violet gland tends to fall out when androgen levels are high over a prolonged time. In short-haired breeds the usually inconspicuous gland may thus appear as a noticeably sparsely haired patch, and it is this condition of the gland area that is most frequent in stud dogs.

In foxes, the violet gland is found on the upper surface of the tail, at roughly one-third of the tail's length from the body, and measures about 25 by 7.5 millimeters in red foxes. Due to its role in steroid hormone metabolism (and possibly production), foxes cannot be "de-scented" by removing this gland. For unknown reasons, the gland's secretions are fluorescent in ultraviolet light; this may result from the presence of carotenoids.
