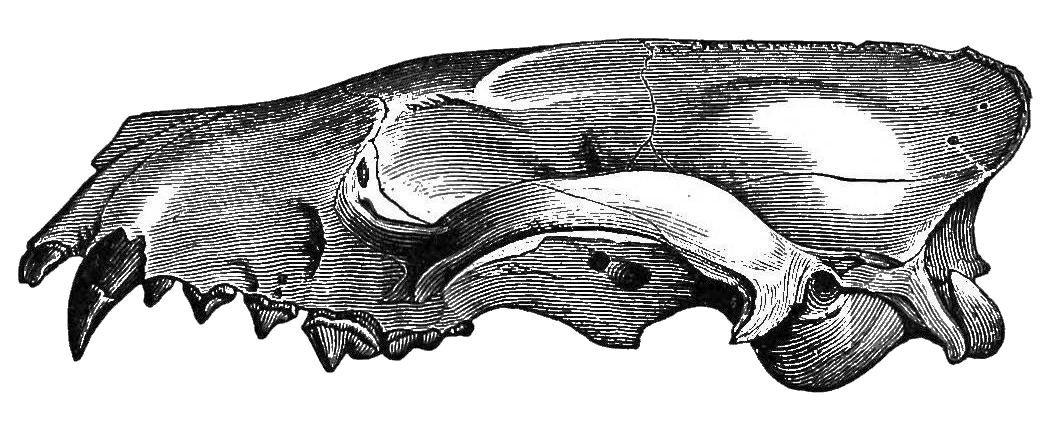
- Skull of Mesocyon coryphaeus

Scientific classification
- Domain: Eukaryota
- Kingdom: Animalia
- Phylum: Chordata
- Class: Mammalia
- Order: Carnivora
- Family: Canidae
- Subfamily: †Hesperocyoninae

Genera
- †Cynodesmus; †Caedocyon; †Ectopocynus; †Enhydrocyon; †Hesperocyon; †Mesocyon; †Osbornodon; †Paraenhydrocyon; †Philotrox; †Sunkahetanka

= Hesperocyoninae =

Hesperocyonines Temporal range: Late Eocene–Middle Miocene

Extinct subfamily of carnivores

The extinct Hesperocyoninae are one of three subfamilies found within the canid family. The other two canid subfamilies are the extinct Borophaginae and extant Caninae.

== Taxonomic history ==
Canid subfamilies

- Canidae
  - †Hesperocyoninae
  - - †Borophaginae
    - Caninae

Hesperocyoninae are basal canids that gave rise to the other two canid subfamilies, the Borophaginae and Caninae. This subfamily was endemic to North America, living from the Duchesnean stage of the Late Eocene through to the early Barstovian stage of the Miocene, lasting around 20 million years. It comprises 10 recognized genera and 26 recognized species. Four major lineages can be defined based on shared characteristics:

- Mesocyon-Enhydrocyon clade (includes Cynodesmus, Sunkahetanka, Philotrox)
- Osbornodon clade
- Paraenhydrocyon
- Ectopocynus clade

The genus Caedocyon, which is only known from a single partial cranium that shows some Paraenhydrocyon affinities, probably represents another independent lineage.

Hesperocyon, which lacks the shared derived characters that would include it within any of the aforementioned clades, is possibly ancestral to many of the lineages. Some evidence indicates the Paraenhydrocyon clade may be directly descended from Hesperocyon gregarius. According to Xiaoming Wang, Hesperocyon coloradensis provides an important link between H. gregarius and the Mesocyon-Enhydrocyon clade.

== Extinction ==
According to an analysis of the fossil record of North American fossil carnivorans, the decline of hesperocyonines to extinction during the period from about 20 to 10 million years ago was driven by competition with felids and borophagines.

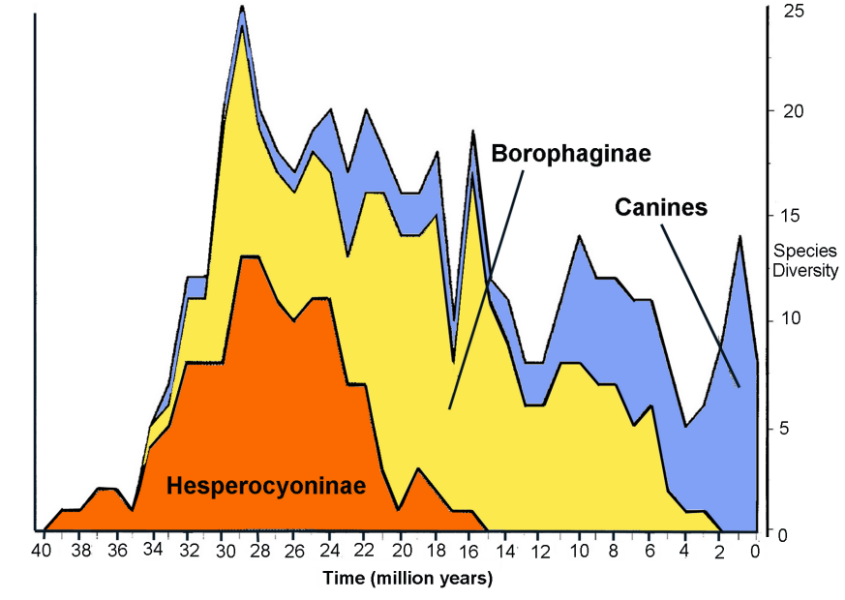
Fluctuation of species within Canidae over 40 million years

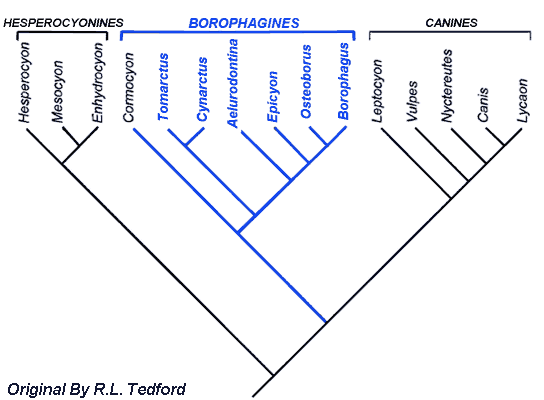
Phylogeny of Hesperocyoninae related to Borophaginae and canines by R.L. Tedford, 1977

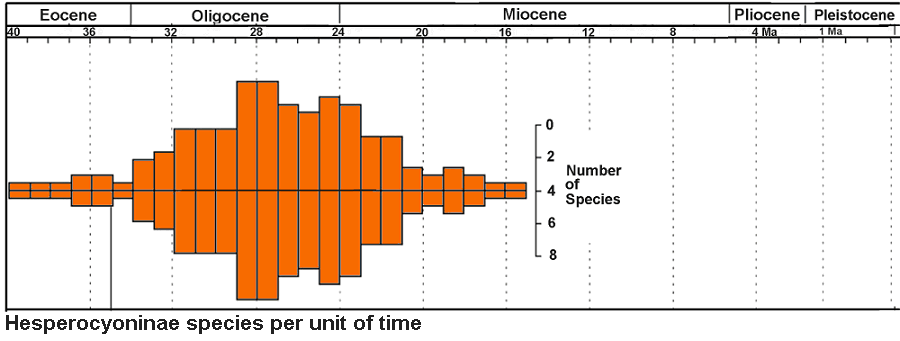
Hesperocyoninae species per unit of time
