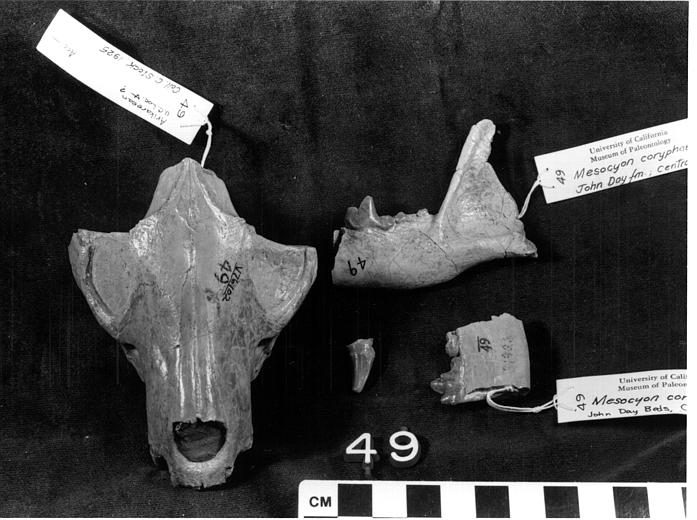
- Skull

Scientific classification
- Kingdom: Animalia
- Phylum: Chordata
- Class: Mammalia
- Order: Carnivora
- Family: Canidae
- Subfamily: †Hesperocyoninae
- Genus: †Mesocyon; Scott, 1890

Type species
- †Temnocyon coryphaeus

Species
- †M. brachyops Merriam 1906; †M. coryphaeus Cope 1879; †M. temnodon Wortman & Matthew 1899

= Mesocyon =

Mesocyon Temporal range: Early Oligocene–Early Miocene

Extinct genus of carnivores

Mesocyon ("middle dog") is an extinct genus of the Hesperocyoninae subfamily of early canids native to North America. It lived from the Oligocene to Early Miocene, 30.3—20.3 Ma, existing for approximately 10 million years. Fossils are known from Oregon, southern California and the northern Great Plains. It was roughly coyote-sized, and the first known canid to have a primarily meat-based diet.

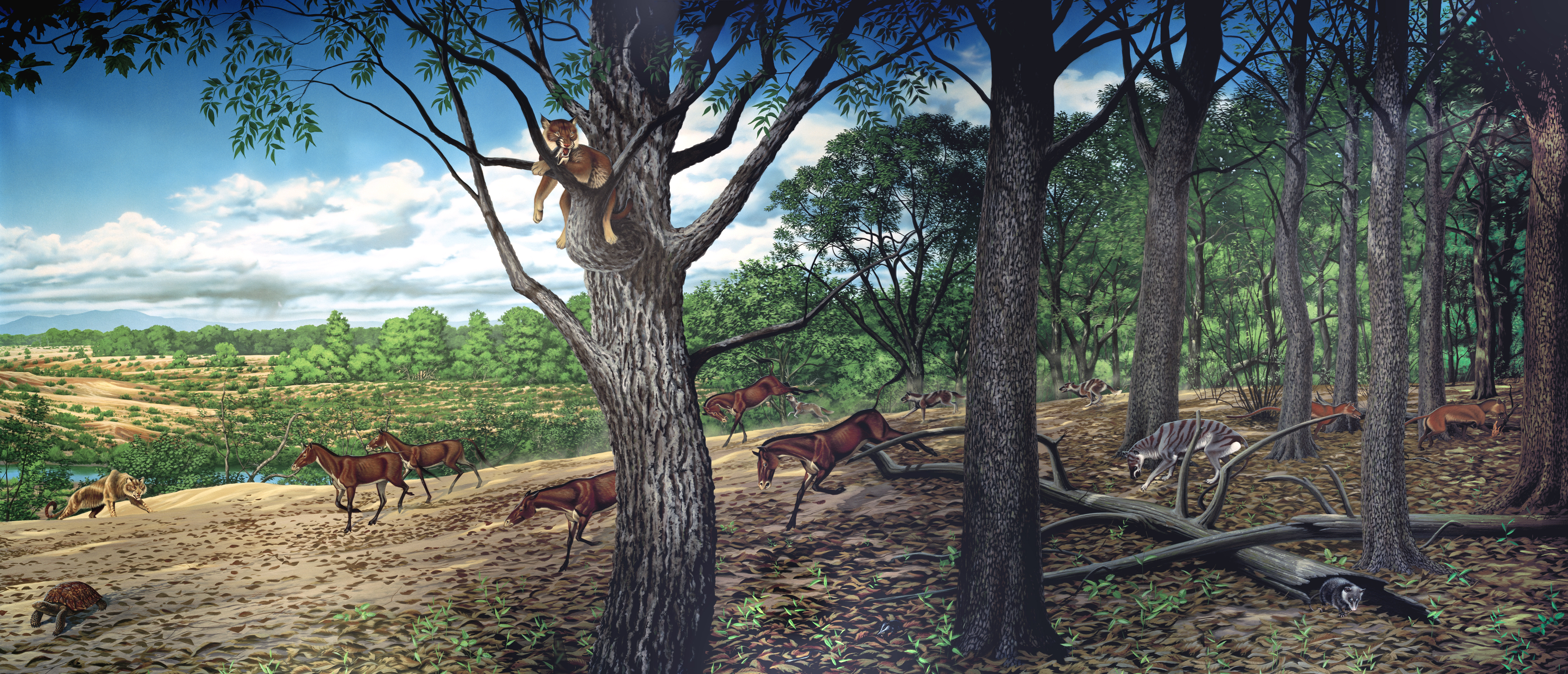
Restoration of Mesocyon (right) and other animals from the Turtle Cove Formation
