= Appearance event ordination =

Scientific method for biochronology

Appearance event ordination or AEO is a scientific method for biochronology through the ordering of the appearance of fossil mammal genera by multivariate analysis, using conjunctional (overlapping) and disconjunctional (nonoverlapping) range distributions in large sets of data.

== Process ==
AEO is based on faunal overlap and stratigraphic superposition to derive a best-fit sequence of first and last appearance events.

=== Step 1 ===
The first step is to translate patterns of overlap and superposition into pairwise first-before-last statements. The wolf species Canis edwardii and Canis armbrusteri are used as example taxa for the following patterns. Each statement means C. edwardii, for example, must have first appeared before C. armbusteri last appeared. This is true whenever either (1) C. edwardii and C. armbrusteri have been found together in at least one nontime-averaged fossil collection, or (2) C. edwardii is found lower in at least one lithostratigraphic section than C. armbrusteri.

=== Step 2 ===
A multivariate ordination algorithm is applied to derive a first-pass, hypothesized sequence of first and last appearances. The minimal constraint on this sequence is that if there is an observed, real-world C. edwardii before C. armbrusteri statement for any pair of taxa, the hypothesized event sequence must replicate it. Then, the program shuffles the events using a maximum likelihood criterion. The criterion basically seeks to pull apart as many hypothesized age range overlaps as possible, especially if they involve common taxa. Taxa are defined as "common" if they are known to overlap with a large fraction of the taxa with which they are implied to overlap.

=== Step 3 ===
Once the relative event sequence has been established, it is converted into numerical time with a nonlinear interpolation algorithm that compares event sequence positions and geochronological age estimates for collections that have them. The calibration only uses:

- ^{40}Argon/^{39}Argon dates
- Uranium-thorium dates for some Pleistocene collections
- Paleomagnetic dates that derive from unambiguous, narrow correlations inferred using nonfaunal tie points such as the position in the section of the Cretaceous–Paleogene boundary, Paleocene-Eocene boundary, or Recent

== NALMA vs. AEO ==
The North American land mammal ages procedure uses subjective opinions by published sources and/or authors, citing authors such as Michael O. Woodburne, Robert W. Wilson, and J. David Archibald.

Appearance event ordination uses objective, explicit, recordable, repeatable, and quantitative analyses of faunal and biostratigraphic data to arrive at a conclusion, according to John Alroy.
