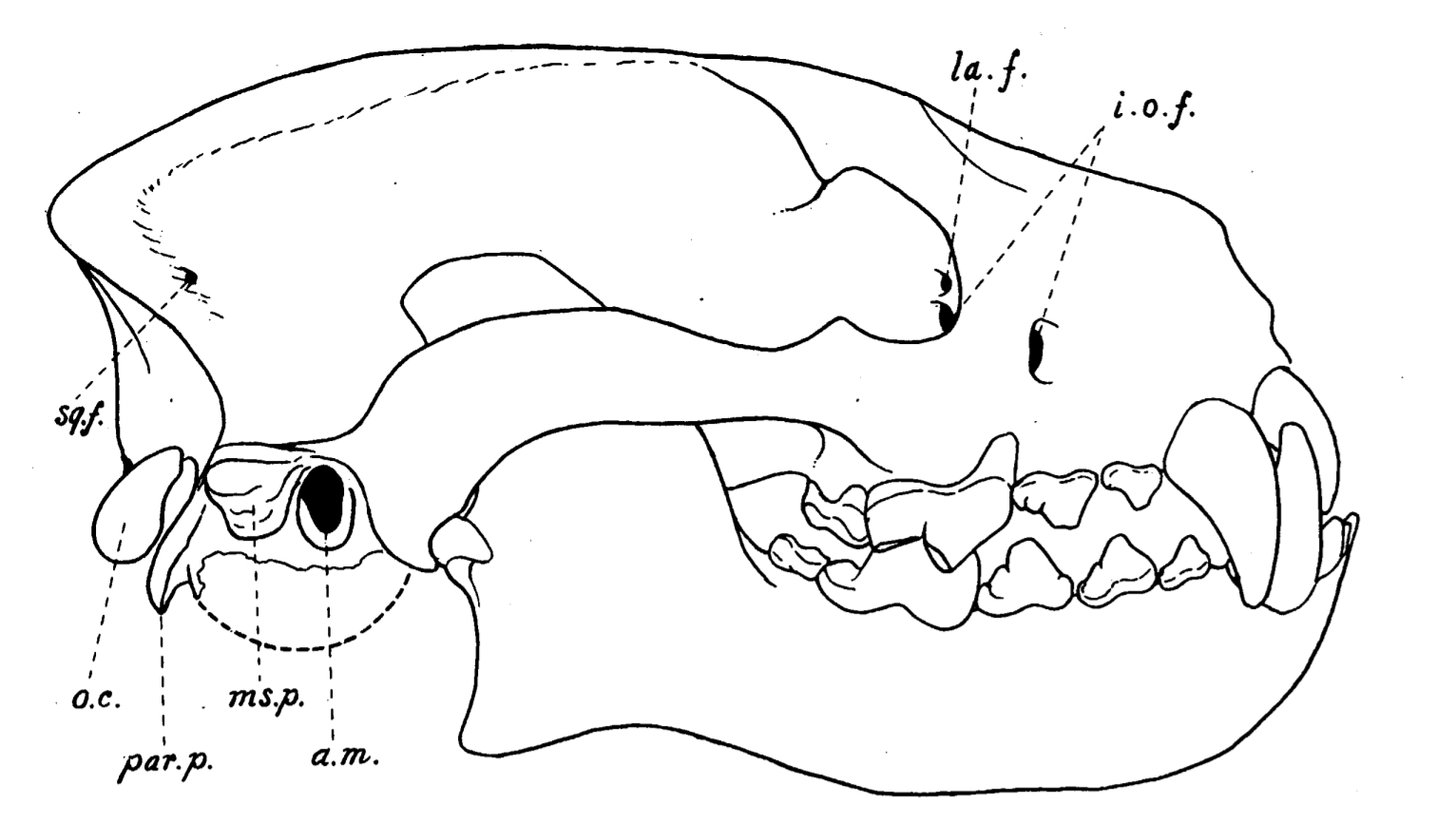

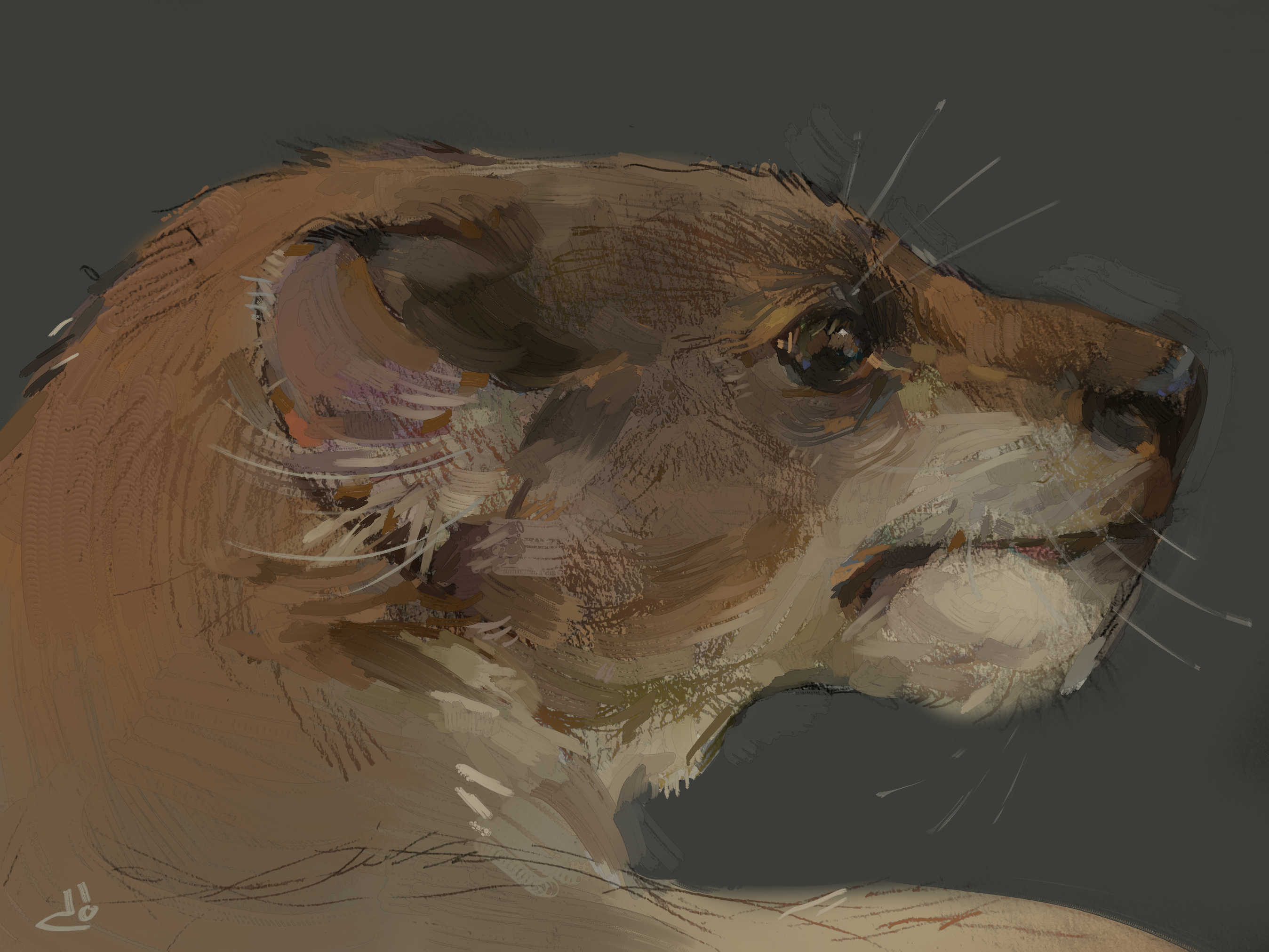

Scientific classification
- Kingdom: Animalia
- Phylum: Chordata
- Class: Mammalia
- Order: Carnivora
- Family: Canidae
- Subfamily: †Hesperocyoninae
- Genus: †Enhydrocyon; Cope, 1879

Type species
- †Enhydrocyon stenocephalus

Species
- See text
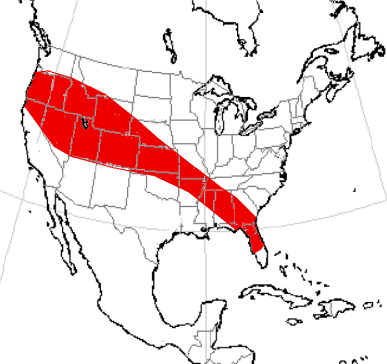
- Range of Enhydrocyon fossil evidence

= Enhydrocyon =

Enhydrocyon Temporal range: Oligocene–Early Miocene

Extinct genus of carnivores

Enhydrocyon is an extinct genus of hesperocyonine canid that inhabited North America during the Oligocene and Early Miocene, 30.8—20.4 Ma, existing for approximately 11 million years.

== Description ==
Enhydrocyon had more specialised and strongly decussating Hunter-Schreger bands (HSBs) compared to earlier canids. It possessed a short snout and deep jaws reminiscent of a jaguar. These features give the skull a shape resembling that of the extant sea otter (Enhydra), prompting the scientific name. Enhydrocyon had an estimated weight of about 10 kilograms (22 lb).

== Palaeobiology ==
=== Diet ===
Species of Enhydrocyon were relatively large, powerfully built carnivores. Enhydrocyon was the earliest genus of canid adapted to be specialized predators. The dentition of Enhydrocyon suggests this animal was a hypercarnivore or mesocarnivore.

== Species ==
- †Enhydrocyon basilatus Cope 1879
- †E. crassidens Matthew 1907
- †E. pahinsintewakpa Macdonald 1963
- †E. sectorius Cope 1883
- †E. stenocephalus Cope 1879
