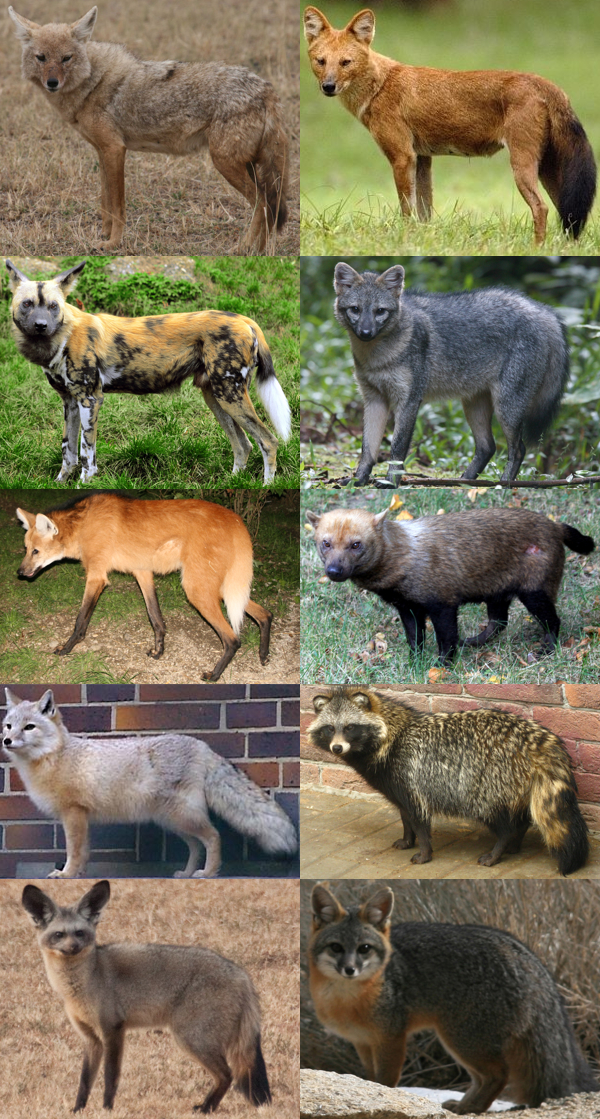
- 10 of the 13 extant canid genera

Scientific classification
- Kingdom: Animalia
- Phylum: Chordata
- Class: Mammalia
- Order: Carnivora
- Suborder: Caniformia
- Clade: Canoidea
- Infraorder: Cynoidea; Flower, 1869
- Family: Canidae; Fischer de Waldheim, 1817

Type genus
- Canis Linnaeus, 1758

Subfamilies and genera
- †Prohesperocyon; †Hesperocyoninae; †Borophaginae; Caninae
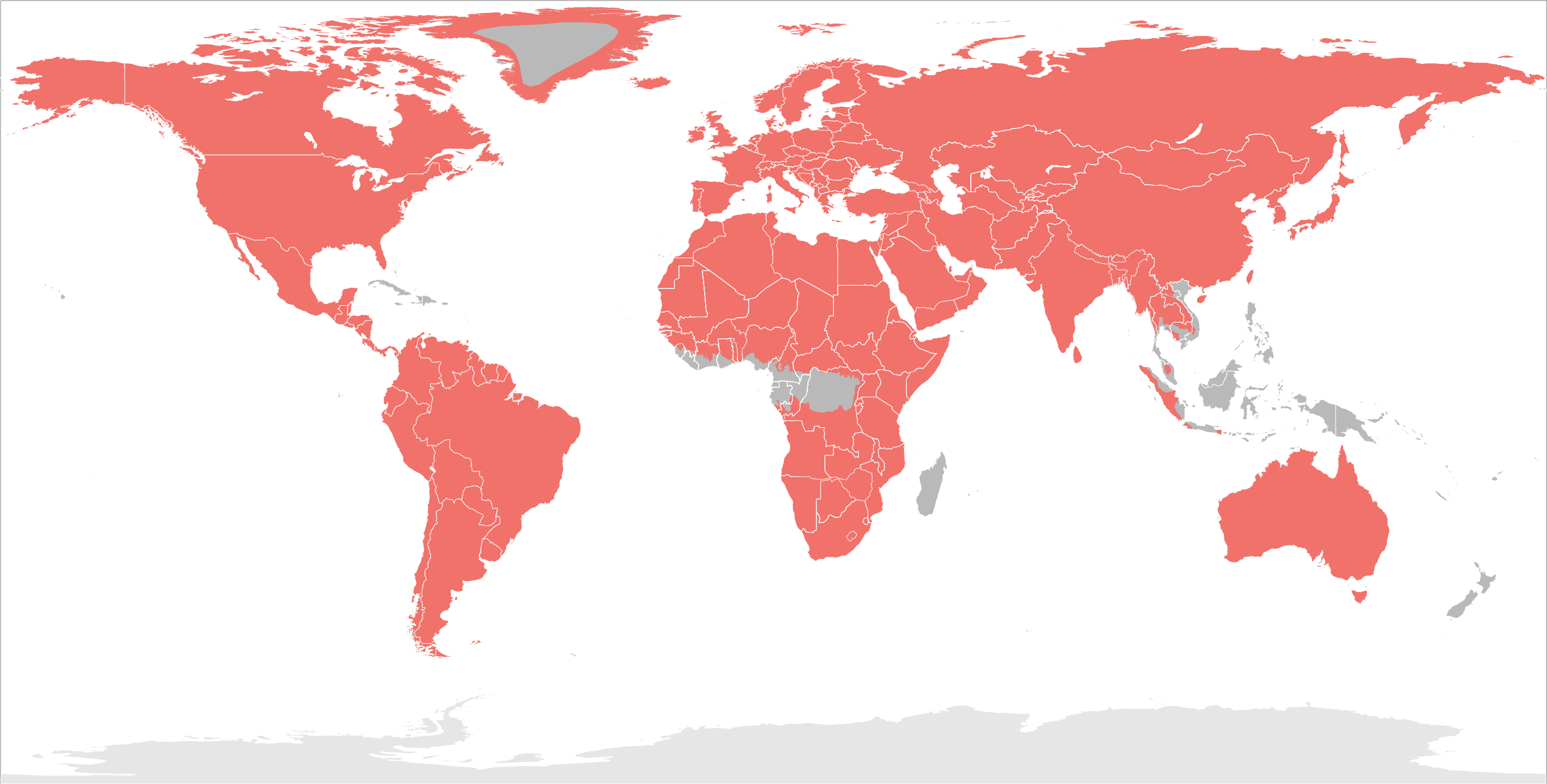
- Canidae distribution

= Canidae =

Canids Temporal range: Late Eocene–Holocene ~37.8–0 Ma

Family of mammals

Canidae (/ˈkæn.ɪ.diː/; from Latin, canis, "dog") is a biological family of caniform carnivorans, constituting a clade. A member of this family is a canid (/ˈkæn.ɪd/, rarely /ˈkeɪ.nɪd/), colloquially referred to as dogs. The family includes three subfamilies: the Caninae, and the extinct Borophaginae and Hesperocyoninae. The Caninae are the canines, and include domestic dogs, wolves, coyotes, raccoon dogs, foxes, jackals, and other species.

Canids are found on all continents except Antarctica, having arrived independently or accompanied by humans over extended periods of time. Canids vary in size from the 2-metre-long (6.6 ft) gray wolf to the 24-centimetre-long (9.4 in) fennec fox. The body forms of canids are similar, typically having long muzzles, upright ears, teeth adapted for cracking bones and slicing flesh, long legs, and bushy tails. They are mostly social animals, living together in family units or small groups and behaving co-operatively. Typically, only the breeding pair in a group breeds and a litter of young are reared annually in an underground den. Canids communicate by scent signals and vocalizations. One canid, the domestic dog, originated from a symbiotic relationship with Upper Paleolithic humans and is one of the most widely kept domestic animals.

== Taxonomy ==
In the history of the carnivores, the family Canidae is represented by the two extinct subfamilies designated as Hesperocyoninae and Borophaginae, and the extant subfamily Caninae. This subfamily includes all living canids and their most recent fossil relatives. All living canids as a group form a dental monophyletic relationship with the extinct borophagines, with both groups having a bicuspid (two points) on the carnassial lower talonid, which gives this tooth an additional ability in mastication. This, together with the development of a distinct entoconid cusp and the broadening of the talonid of the first lower molar, and the corresponding enlargement of the talon of the upper first molar and reduction of its parastyle distinguish these late Cenozoic canids and are the essential differences that identify their clade.

The cat-like Feliformia and dog-like Caniformia emerged within the Carnivoramorpha around 45–42 Mya (million years ago). The Canidae first appeared in North America during the Late Eocene (37.8-33.9 Mya). They did not reach Eurasia until the Late Miocene or to South America until the Late Pliocene.

=== Phylogenetic relationships ===
This cladogram shows the phylogenetic position of canids within Caniformia:

- Caniformia
  - Arctoidea
    (bears, procyonids, pinnipeds, etc.)
  - Canidae
    - †Hesperocyoninae
      (Mesocyon, Enhydrocyon, Hesperocyon, and other basal canines, e.g. Cynodictis)
    - - †Borophaginae
        (Aelurodon, cynarctins, and others)
      - Caninae
        (all modern canids and extinct relatives)

== Evolution ==
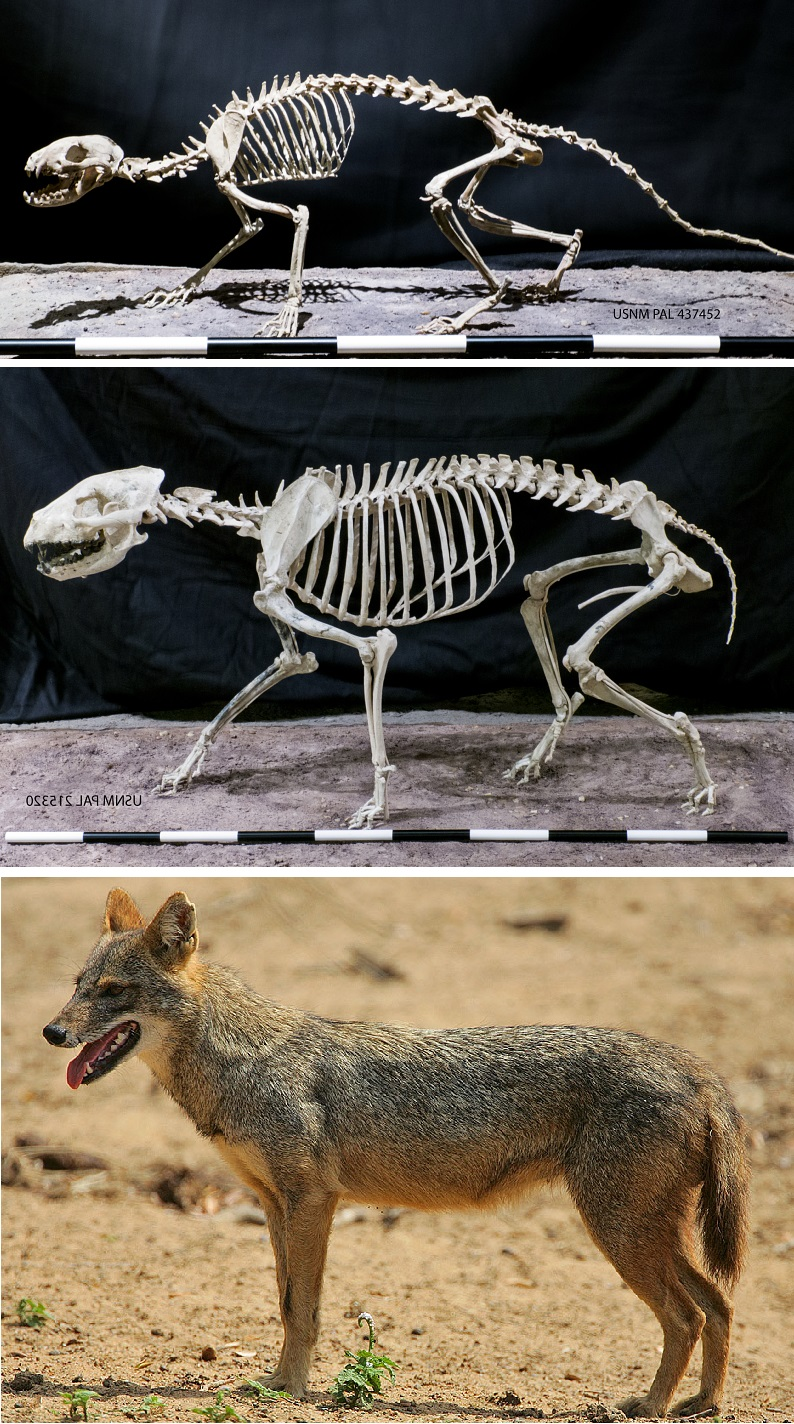
Representatives of three canid subfamilies: Hesperocyon (Hesperocyoninae), Aelurodon (Borophaginae) and Canis aureus (Caninae)

The Canidae are a diverse group of some 37 species ranging in size from the maned wolf with its long limbs to the short-legged bush dog. Modern canids inhabit forests, tundra, savannas, and deserts throughout tropical and temperate parts of the world. The evolutionary relationships between the species have been studied in the past using morphological approaches, but more recently, molecular studies have enabled the investigation of phylogenetics relationships. In some species, genetic divergence has been suppressed by the high level of gene flow between different populations and where the species have hybridized, large hybrid zones exist.

=== Eocene epoch ===
Carnivorans evolved after the extinction of the non-avian dinosaurs 66 million years ago. Around 50 million years ago, or earlier, in the Paleocene, the Carnivora split into two main divisions: caniform and feliform.

Canidae soon divided into three subfamilies, each of which diverged during the Eocene: Hesperocyoninae (about 39.74–15 Mya), Borophaginae (about 34–32 Mya), and Caninae (about 34–30 Mya; the only surviving subfamily). Members of each subfamily showed an increase in body mass with time and some exhibited specialized hypercarnivorous diets that made them prone to extinction.

=== Oligocene epoch ===
By the Oligocene, all three subfamilies (Hesperocyoninae, Borophaginae, and Caninae) had appeared in the fossil record of North America. The earliest and most primitive branch of the Canidae was Hesperocyoninae. These early canids probably evolved for the fast pursuit of prey in a grassland habitat; they resembled modern viverrids in appearance. Hesperocyonines eventually became extinct in the middle Miocene. One of the early Hesperocyonines, the genus Hesperocyon, gave rise to Archaeocyon and Leptocyon. These branches led to the borophagine and canine radiations.

=== Miocene epoch ===
Around 8 Mya, the Beringian land bridge allowed members of the genus Eucyon a means to enter Asia from North America and they continued on to colonize Europe.

=== Pliocene epoch ===
The Canis, Urocyon, and Vulpes genera developed from canids from North America, where the canine radiation began. The success of these canids was related to the development of lower carnassials that were capable of both mastication and shearing. Around 5 million years ago, some of the Old World Eucyon evolved into the first members of Canis, In the Pliocene, around 4–5 Mya, Canis lepophagus appeared in North America. This was small and sometimes coyote-like. Others were wolf-like. C. latrans (the coyote) is theorized to descend from C. lepophagus.

The formation of the Isthmus of Panama, about 3 Mya, joined South America to North America, allowing canids to invade South America, where they diversified. However, the last common ancestor of the South American canids lived in North America some 4 Mya and more than one incursion across the new land bridge is likely given the fact that more than one lineage is present in South America. Two North American lineages found in South America are the gray fox (Urocyon cinereoargentus) and the now-extinct dire wolf (Aenocyon dirus). Besides these, there are species endemic to South America: the maned wolf (Chrysocyon brachyurus), the short-eared dog (Atelocynus microtis), the bush dog (Speothos venaticus), the crab-eating fox (Cerdocyon thous), and the South American foxes (Lycalopex spp.). The monophyly of this group has been established by molecular means.

=== Pleistocene epoch ===
During the Pleistocene, the North American wolf line appeared, with Canis edwardii, clearly identifiable as a wolf, and Canis rufus appeared, possibly a direct descendant of C. edwardii. Around 0.8 Mya, Canis ambrusteri emerged in North America. A large wolf, it was found all over North and Central America and was eventually supplanted by the dire wolf, which then spread into South America during the Late Pleistocene.

By 0.3 Mya, a number of subspecies of the gray wolf (C. lupus) had developed and had spread throughout Europe and northern Asia. The gray wolf colonized North America during the late Rancholabrean era across the Bering land bridge, with at least three separate invasions, with each one consisting of one or more different Eurasian gray wolf clades. MtDNA studies have shown that there are at least four extant C. lupus lineages. The dire wolf shared its habitat with the gray wolf, but became extinct in a large-scale extinction event that occurred around 11,500 years ago. It may have been more of a scavenger than a hunter; its molars appear to be adapted for crushing bones and it may have gone extinct as a result of the extinction of the large herbivorous animals on whose carcasses it relied.

In 2015, a study of mitochondrial genome sequences and whole-genome nuclear sequences of African and Eurasian canids indicated that extant wolf-like canids have colonized Africa from Eurasia at least five times throughout the Pliocene and Pleistocene, which is consistent with fossil evidence suggesting that much of African canid fauna diversity resulted from the immigration of Eurasian ancestors, likely coincident with Plio-Pleistocene climatic oscillations between arid and humid conditions. When comparing the African and Eurasian golden jackals, the study concluded that the African specimens represented a distinct monophyletic lineage that should be recognized as a separate species, Canis anthus (African golden wolf). According to a phylogeny derived from nuclear sequences, the Eurasian golden jackal (Canis aureus) diverged from the wolf/coyote lineage 1.9 Mya, but the African golden wolf separated 1.3 Mya. Mitochondrial genome sequences indicated the Ethiopian wolf diverged from the wolf/coyote lineage slightly prior to that.

== Characteristics ==
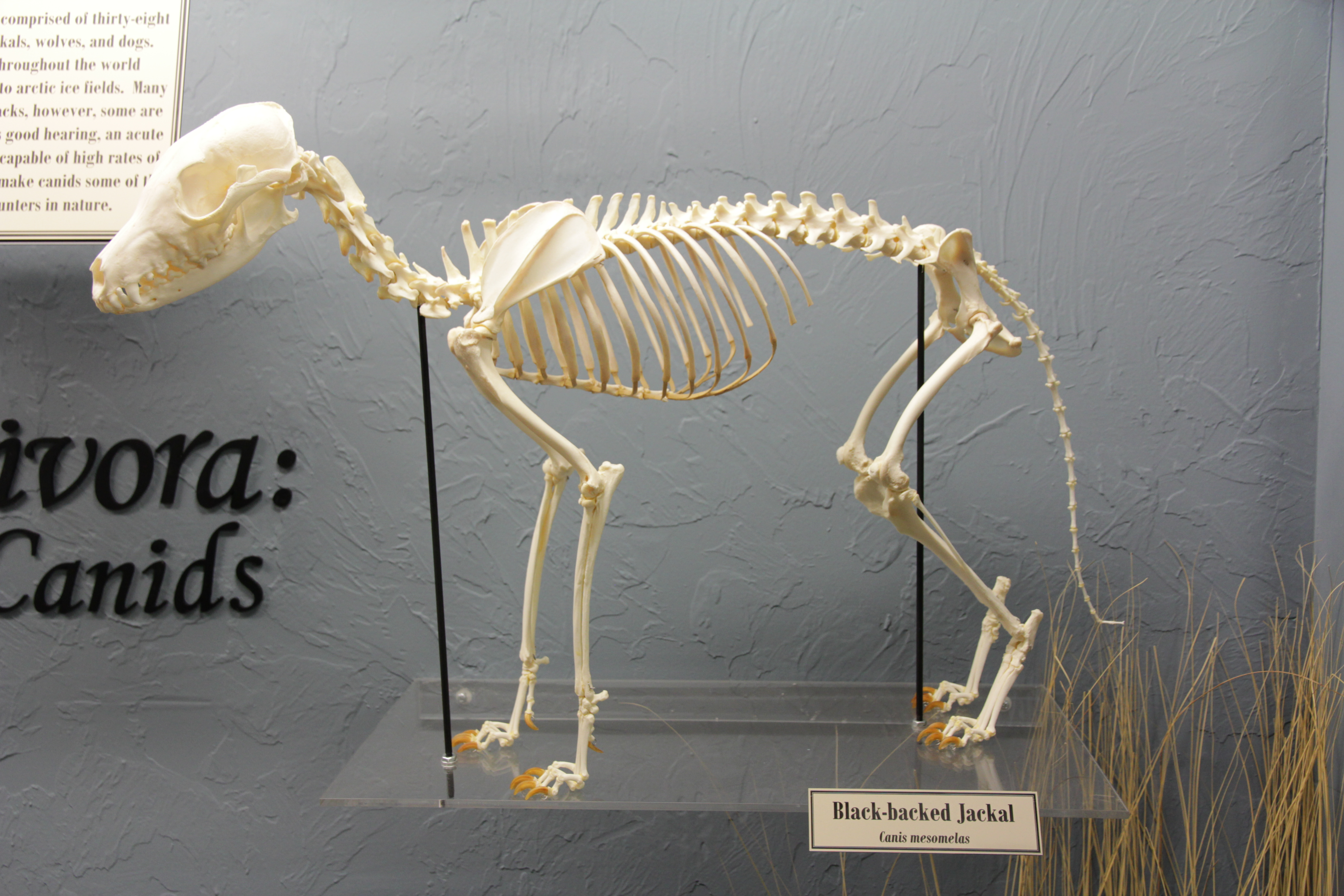
Skeleton of a black-backed jackal (Lupulella mesomelas) on display at the Museum of Osteology

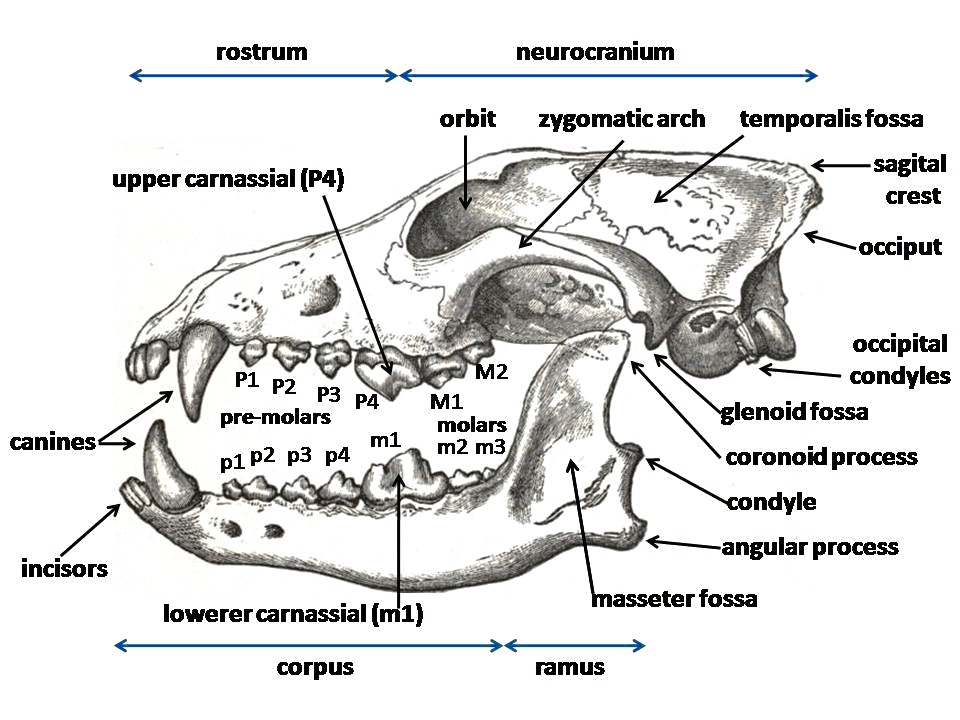
Diagram of a wolf skull with key features labelled

Eurasian wolf skull

Wild canids are native to all continents except Australasia and Antarctica, and also occur as feral (human-introduced) in New Guinea and Australia. They inhabit a wide range of different habitats, including deserts, mountains, forests, and grasslands. They vary in size from the fennec fox, which may be as little as 24 cm (9.4 in) in length and weigh 0.6 kg (1.3 lb), to the gray wolf, which may be up to 160 cm (63 in) long, and can weigh up to 79 kg (174 lb). Only a few species are arboreal—the gray fox, the closely related island fox and the raccoon dog habitually climb trees.

All canids have a similar basic form, as exemplified by the gray wolf, although the relative length of muzzle, limbs, ears, and tail vary considerably between species. With the exceptions of the bush dog, the raccoon dog and some domestic dog breeds, canids have relatively long legs and lithe bodies, adapted for chasing prey. The tails are bushy and the length and quality of the pelage vary with the season. The muzzle portion of the skull is much more elongated than that of the cat family. The zygomatic arches are wide, there is a transverse lambdoidal ridge at the rear of the cranium and in some species, a sagittal crest running from front to back. The bony orbits around the eye never form a complete ring and the auditory bullae are smooth and rounded. Females have three to seven pairs of mammae.

All canids are digitigrade, meaning they walk on their toes. The tip of the nose is always naked, as are the cushioned pads on the soles of the feet. These latter consist of a single pad behind the tip of each toe and a more-or-less three-lobed central pad under the roots of the digits. Hairs grow between the pads and in the Arctic fox the sole of the foot is densely covered with hair at some times of the year. With the exception of the four-toed African wild dog (Lycaon pictus), five toes are on the forefeet, but the pollex (thumb) is reduced and does not reach the ground. On the hind feet are four toes, but in some domestic dogs, a fifth vestigial toe, known as a dewclaw, is sometimes present, but has no anatomical connection to the rest of the foot. In some species, slightly curved nails are non-retractile and more-or-less blunt while other species have sharper, partially-retractile claws.

The canine penis contains a baculum and a structure called the bulbus glandis that expands during copulation, forming a copulatory tie that lasts for up to an hour. Young canids are born blind, with their eyes opening a few weeks after birth. All living canids (Caninae) have a ligament analogous to the nuchal ligament of ungulates used to maintain the posture of the head and neck with little active muscle exertion; this ligament allows them to conserve energy while running long distances following scent trails with their nose to the ground. However, based on skeletal details of the neck, at least some of the Borophaginae (such as Aelurodon) are believed to have lacked this ligament.

=== Dentition ===
Dentition relates to the arrangement of teeth in the mouth, with the dental notation for the upper-jaw teeth using the upper-case letters I to denote incisors, C for canines, P for premolars, and M for molars, and the lower-case letters i, c, p and m to denote the mandible teeth. Teeth are numbered using one side of the mouth and from the front of the mouth to the back. In carnivores, the upper premolar P4 and the lower molar m1 form the carnassials that are used together in a scissor-like action to shear the muscle and tendon of prey.

Canids use their premolars for cutting and crushing except for the upper fourth premolar P4 (the upper carnassial) that is only used for cutting. They use their molars for grinding except for the lower first molar m1 (the lower carnassial) that has evolved for both cutting and grinding depending on the canid's dietary adaptation. On the lower carnassial, the trigonid is used for slicing and the talonid is used for grinding. The ratio between the trigonid and the talonid indicates a carnivore's dietary habits, with a larger trigonid indicating a hypercarnivore and a larger talonid indicating a more omnivorous diet. Because of its low variability, the length of the lower carnassial is used to provide an estimate of a carnivore's body size.

A study of the estimated bite force at the canine teeth of a large sample of living and fossil mammalian predators, when adjusted for their body mass, found that for placental mammals the bite force at the canines was greatest in the extinct dire wolf (163), followed among the modern canids by the four hypercarnivores that often prey on animals larger than themselves: the African wild dog (142), the gray wolf (136), the dhole (112), and the dingo (108). The bite force at the carnassials showed a similar trend to the canines. A predator's largest prey size is strongly influenced by its biomechanical limits.

Most canids have 42 teeth, with a dental formula of: 3.1.4.23.1.4.3. The bush dog has only one upper molar with two below, the dhole has two above and two below. and the bat-eared fox has three or four upper molars and four lower ones. The molar teeth are strong in most species, allowing the animals to crack open bone to reach the marrow. The deciduous, or baby teeth, formula in canids is 3.1.33.1.3, molars being completely absent.

== Life history ==
=== Social behavior ===
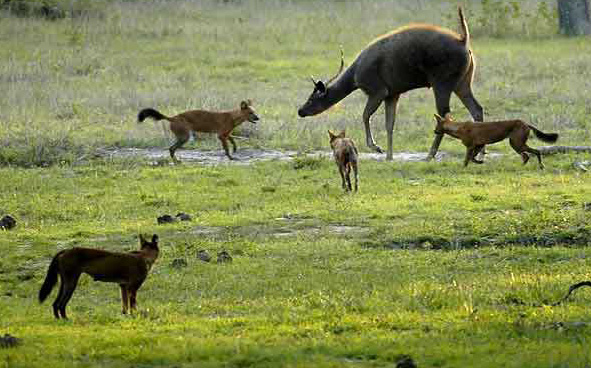
Dholes attacking a sambar, Bandipur National Park

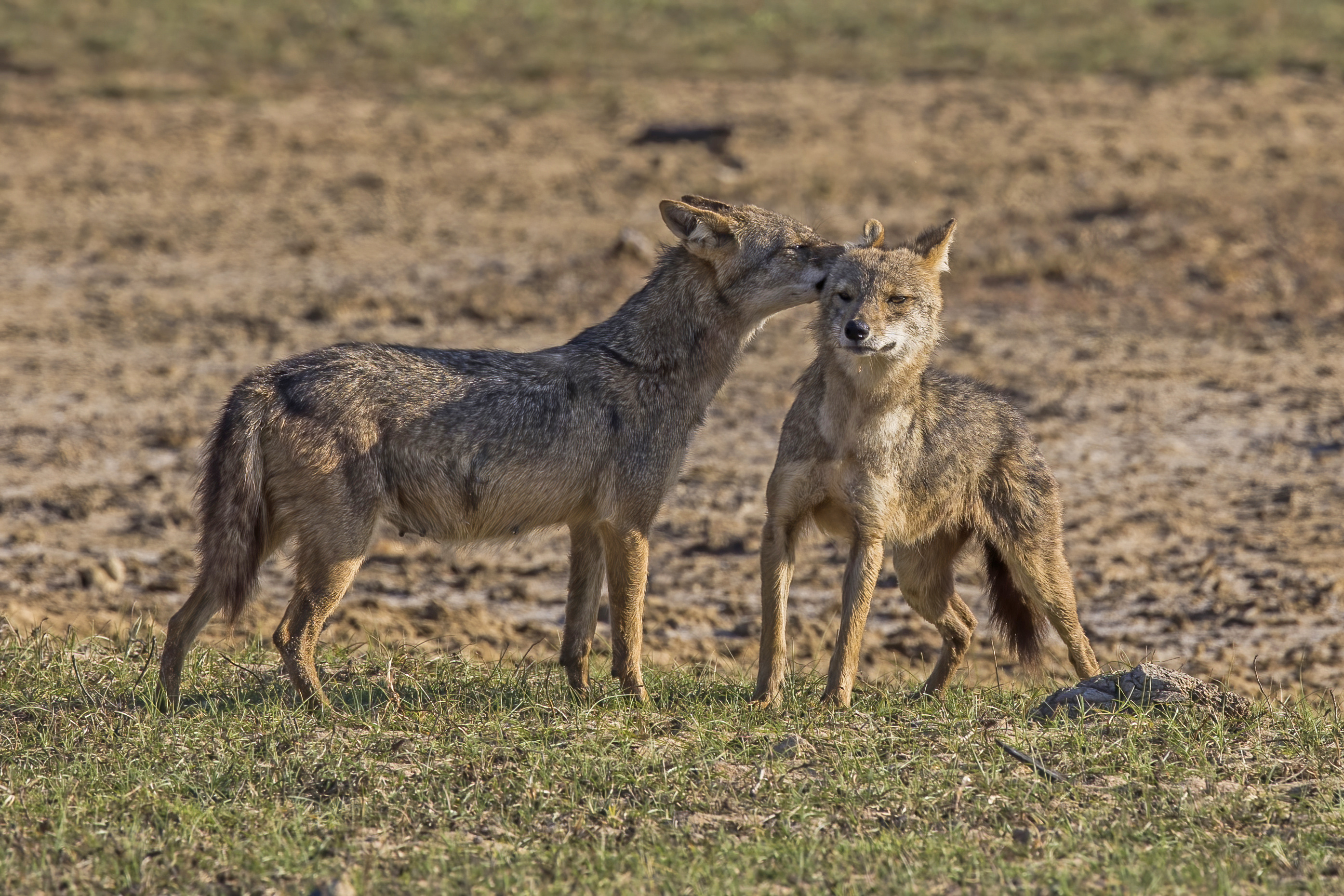
Sri Lankan jackals grooming each other

Almost all canids are social animals and live together in groups. In general, they are territorial or have a home range and sleep in the open, using their dens only for breeding and sometimes in bad weather. In most foxes, and in many of the true dogs, a male and female pair work together to hunt and to raise their young. Gray wolves and some of the other larger canids live in larger groups called packs. African wild dogs have packs which may consist of 20 to 40 animals and packs of fewer than about seven individuals may be incapable of successful reproduction. Hunting in packs has the advantage that larger prey items can be tackled. Some species form packs or live in small family groups depending on the circumstances, including the type of available food. In most species, some individuals live on their own. In most cases, the breeding male and female are the only pack members to breed.

=== Communication ===
Red foxes barking in Pinbury Park, Gloucestershire, England.

Canids communicate with each other by scent signals, by visual clues and gestures, and by vocalizations such as growls, barks, and howls. In most cases, groups have a home territory from which they drive out other conspecifics. Canids use urine scent marks to mark their food caches or warn trespassing individuals. Social behavior is also mediated by secretions from glands on the upper surface of the tail near its root and from the anal glands, preputial glands, and supracaudal glands.

=== Reproduction ===
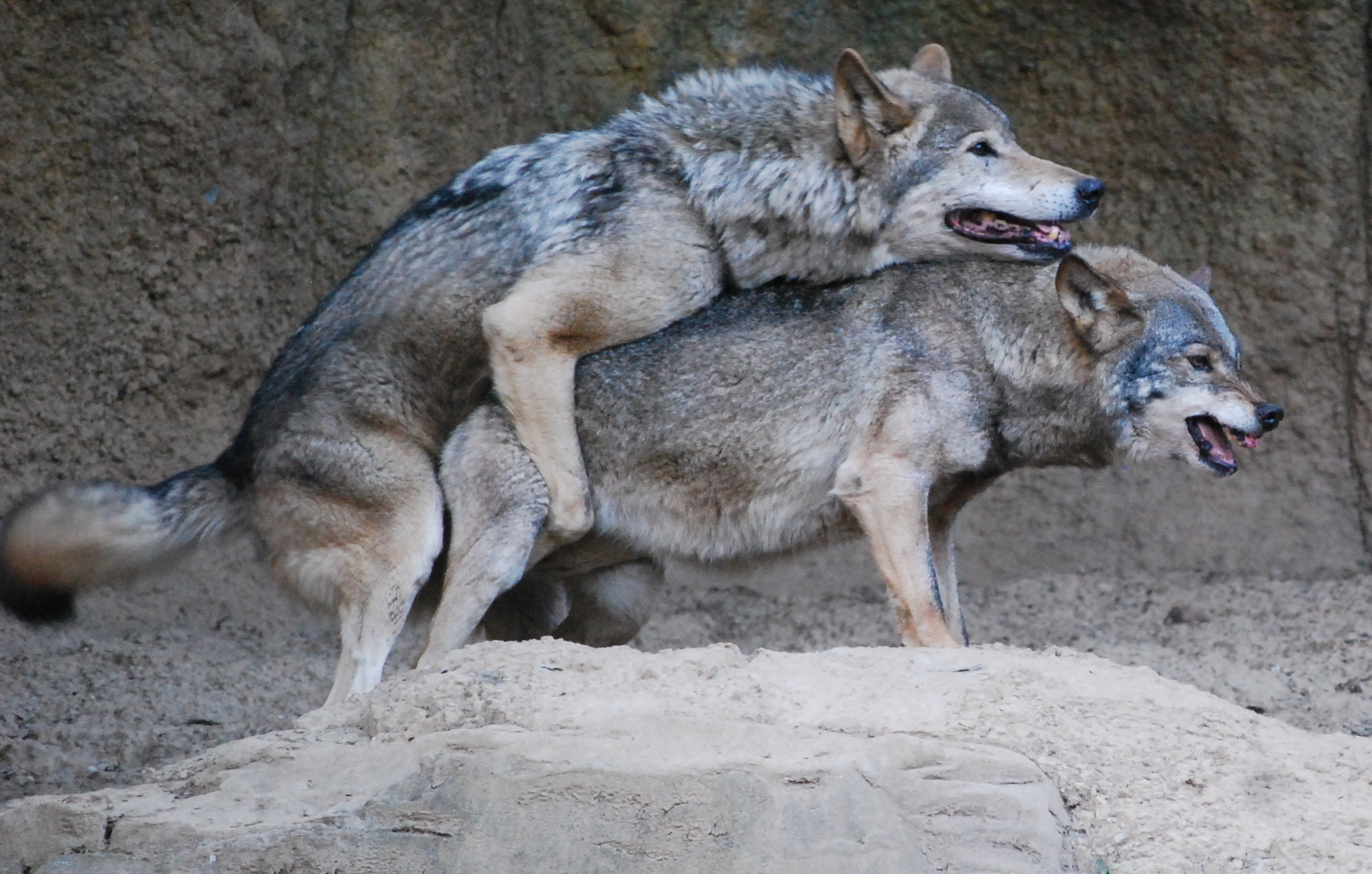
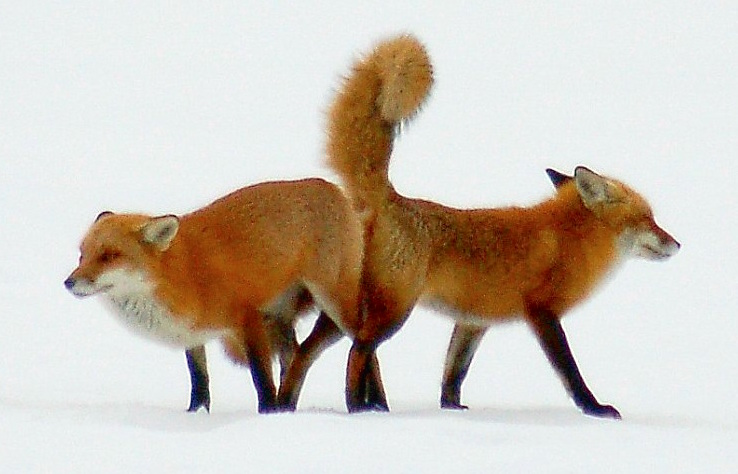
Mating Korean wolves and red foxes
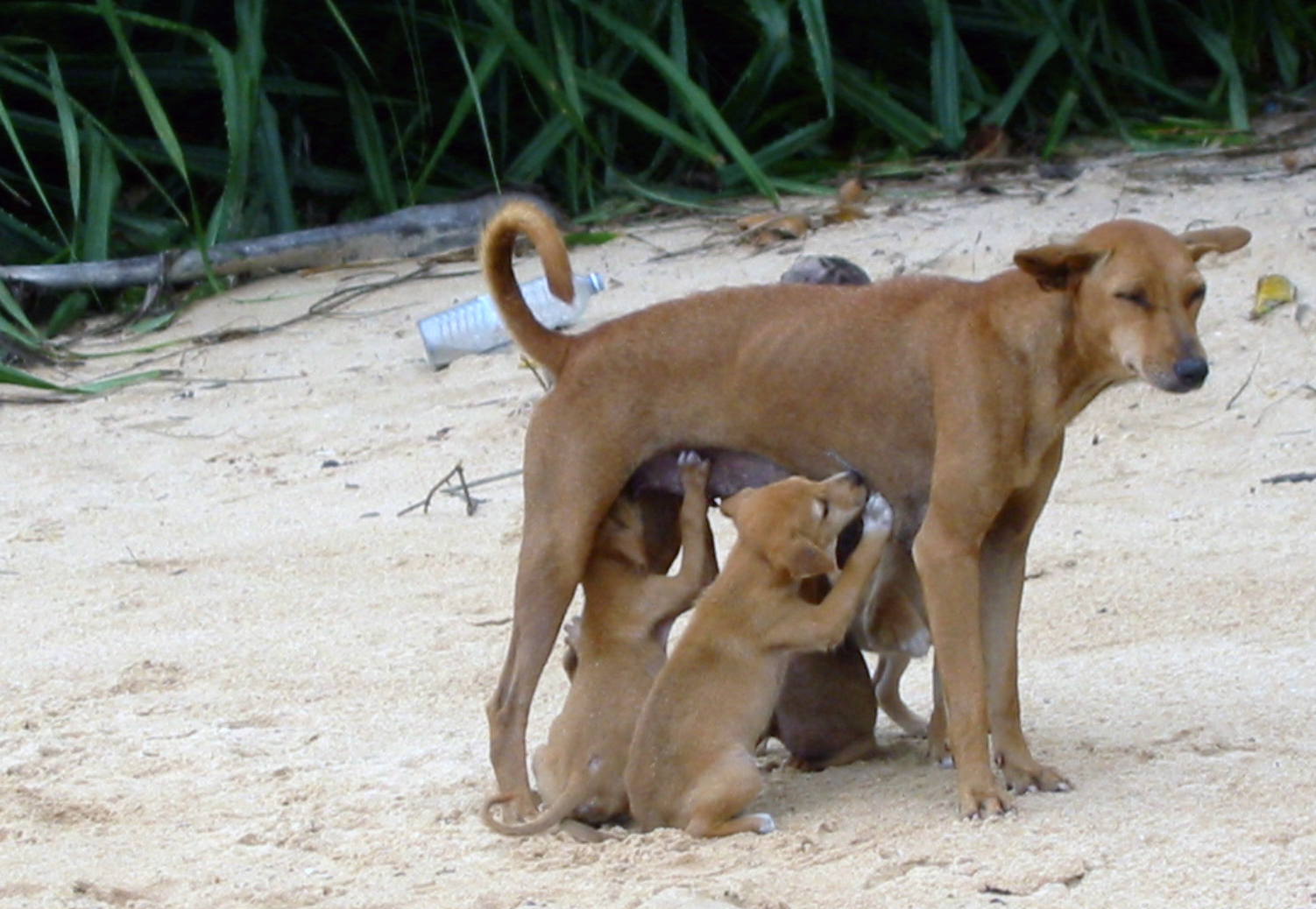
A feral dog from Sri Lanka nursing her pups

Canids as a group exhibit several reproductive traits that are uncommon among mammals as a whole. They are typically monogamous, provide paternal care to their offspring, have reproductive cycles with lengthy proestral and dioestral phases and have a copulatory tie during mating. They also retain adult offspring in the social group, suppressing the ability of these to breed while making use of the alloparental care they can provide to help raise the next generation. Most canid species are spontaneous ovulators, though maned wolves are induced ovulators.

During the proestral period, increased levels of estradiol make the female attractive to the male. There is a rise in progesterone during the estral phase when female is receptive. Following this, the level of estradiol fluctuates and there is a lengthy dioestrous phase during which the female is pregnant. Pseudo-pregnancy often occurs in canids that have ovulated but failed to conceive. A period of anestrus follows pregnancy or pseudo-pregnancy, there being only one oestral period during each breeding season. Small and medium-sized canids mostly have a gestation of 50 to 60 days, while larger species average 60 to 65 days. The time of year in which the breeding season occurs is related to the length of day, as has been shown for several species that have been moved across the equator and experiences a six-month shift of phase. Domestic dogs and certain small canids in captivity may come into oestrus more often, perhaps because the photoperiod stimulus breaks down under conditions of artificial lighting. Canids have an oestrus period of 1 to 20 days, lasting one week in most species.

The size of a litter varies, with from one to 16 or more pups being born. The young are born small, blind and helpless and require a long period of parental care. They are kept in a den, most often dug into the ground, for warmth and protection. When the young begin eating solid food, both parents, and often other pack members, bring food back for them from the hunt. This is most often vomited up from the adult's stomach. Where such pack involvement in the feeding of the litter occurs, the breeding success rate is higher than is the case where females split from the group and rear their pups in isolation. Young canids may take a year to mature and learn the skills they need to survive. In some species, such as the African wild dog, male offspring usually remain in the natal pack, while females disperse as a group and join another small group of the opposite sex to form a new pack.

== Canids and humans ==
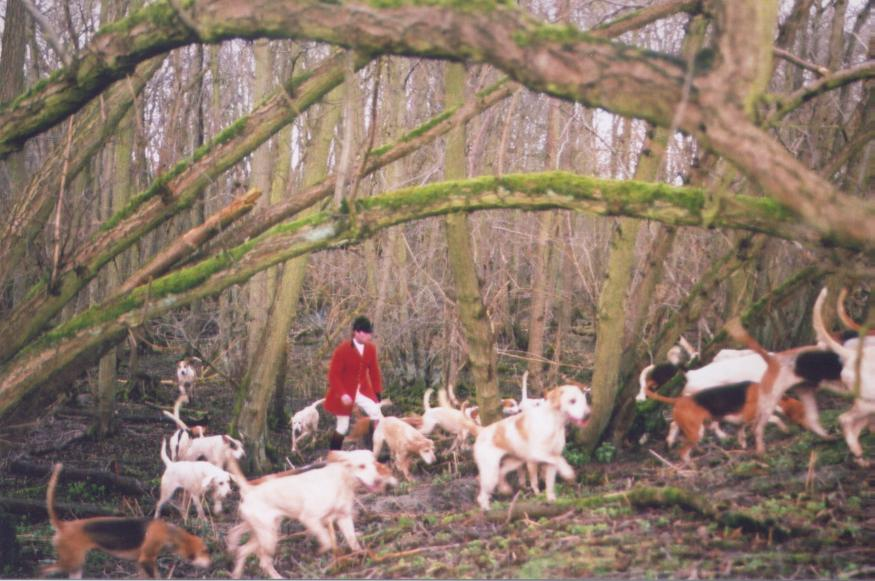
Traditional English fox hunt

One canid, the domestic dog, was the first species domesticated by humans. The archaeological record shows the first undisputed dog remains buried beside humans 14,700 years ago, with disputed remains occurring 36,000 years ago. These dates imply that the earliest dogs arose in the time of human hunter-gatherers and not agriculturists.

The fact that wolves are pack animals with cooperative social structures may have been the reason that the relationship developed. Humans benefited from the canid's loyalty, cooperation, teamwork, alertness and tracking abilities, while the wolf may have benefited from the use of weapons to tackle larger prey and the sharing of food. Humans and dogs may have evolved together.

Though instances of canids killing humans are rare, numerous deaths have been recorded. Among canids, only the gray wolf has been known to prey on humans. At least two records of coyotes killing humans have been published, as well as at least two other reports of golden jackals killing children. Deaths caused by domestic dogs are more frequent, with an average of 34 deaths resulting from fatal dog attacks occurring annually in the United States.

Human may trap and hunt some canid species for their fur. Some canids, such as the gray wolf, coyote and red fox may be hunted for sport. Canids such as the dhole are now endangered in the wild because of persecution, habitat loss, a depletion of ungulate prey species and transmission of diseases from domestic dogs.

Some canid species have benefitted from the presence of humans. For example, the range of the coyote has expanded greatly across North America due to the extirpation of large carnivores by humans and its ability to adapt to urban ecosystems. Red foxes have likewise adapted well to urban habitats and have established new populations in areas where they have been deliberately introduced such as Australia.

== See also ==
- List of canids
- Largest wild canids
- Canid hybrid
- Free-ranging dog

== Bibliography ==
- Wang, Xiaoming; Tedford, Richard H. (2008). Dogs:Their Fossil Relatives and Evolutionary History. Columbia University Press, New York. ISBN 978-0-231-13529-0.
