= List of the Cenozoic life of Nebraska =

This list of the Cenozoic life of Nebraska contains the various prehistoric life-forms whose fossilized remains have been reported from within the US state of Nebraska and are between 66 million and 10,000 years of age.

== A ==
- Acer
  - †Acer minor
- †Achlyoscapter
- Acipenser
- †Aciprion
  - †Aciprion formosum
- Acris
  - †Acris crepitans – or unidentified comparable form
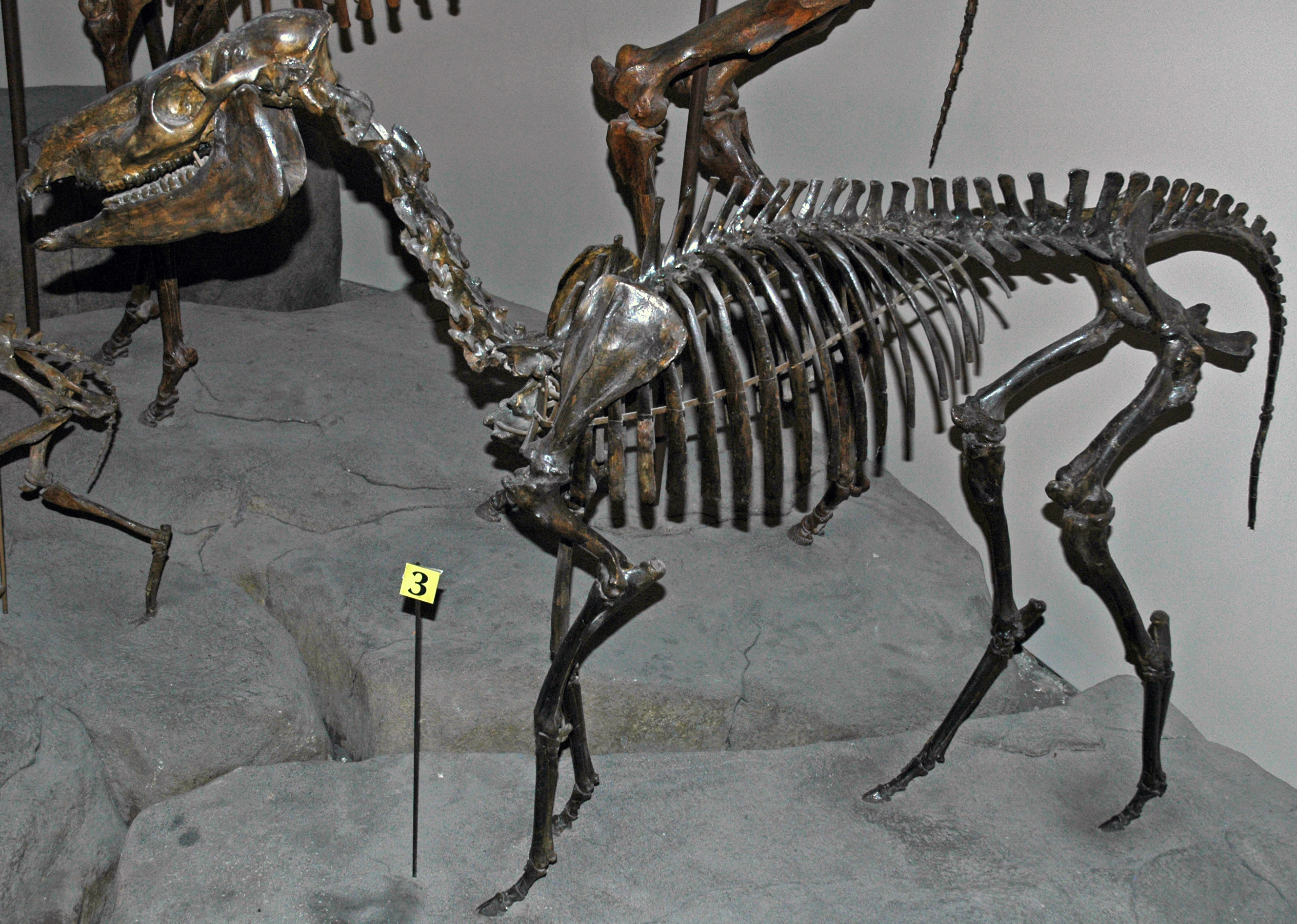
- Mounted fossilized skeleton of the Miocene horse Acritohippus
  †Acritohippus
  - †Acritohippus isonesus
  - †Acritohippus tertius
- †Adeloblarina – or unidentified comparable form
- †Adjidaumo
  - †Adjidaumo intermedius – type locality for species
  - †Adjidaumo maximus – type locality for species
  - †Adjidaumo minimus
  - †Adjidaumo minutus
- †Aelurodon
  - †Aelurodon asthenostylus
  - †Aelurodon ferox
  - †Aelurodon mcgrewi – type locality for species
  - †Aelurodon stirtoni
  - †Aelurodon taxoides
  - †Aelurodon wheelerianus – or unidentified comparable form
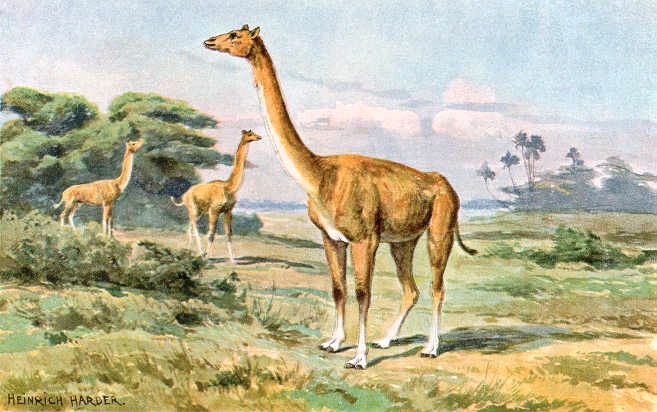
- Life restoration of the Miocene camel Aepycamelus, or the long-necked camel. Heinrich Harder (1920).
  †Aepycamelus
  - †Aepycamelus major
  - †Aepycamelus robustus
- Agkistrodon
  - †Agkistrodon contortix – or unidentified comparable form
- †Agnotocastor
  - †Agnotocastor readingi – type locality for species
- †Agriochoerus
  - †Agriochoerus antiquus
- †Agriotherium
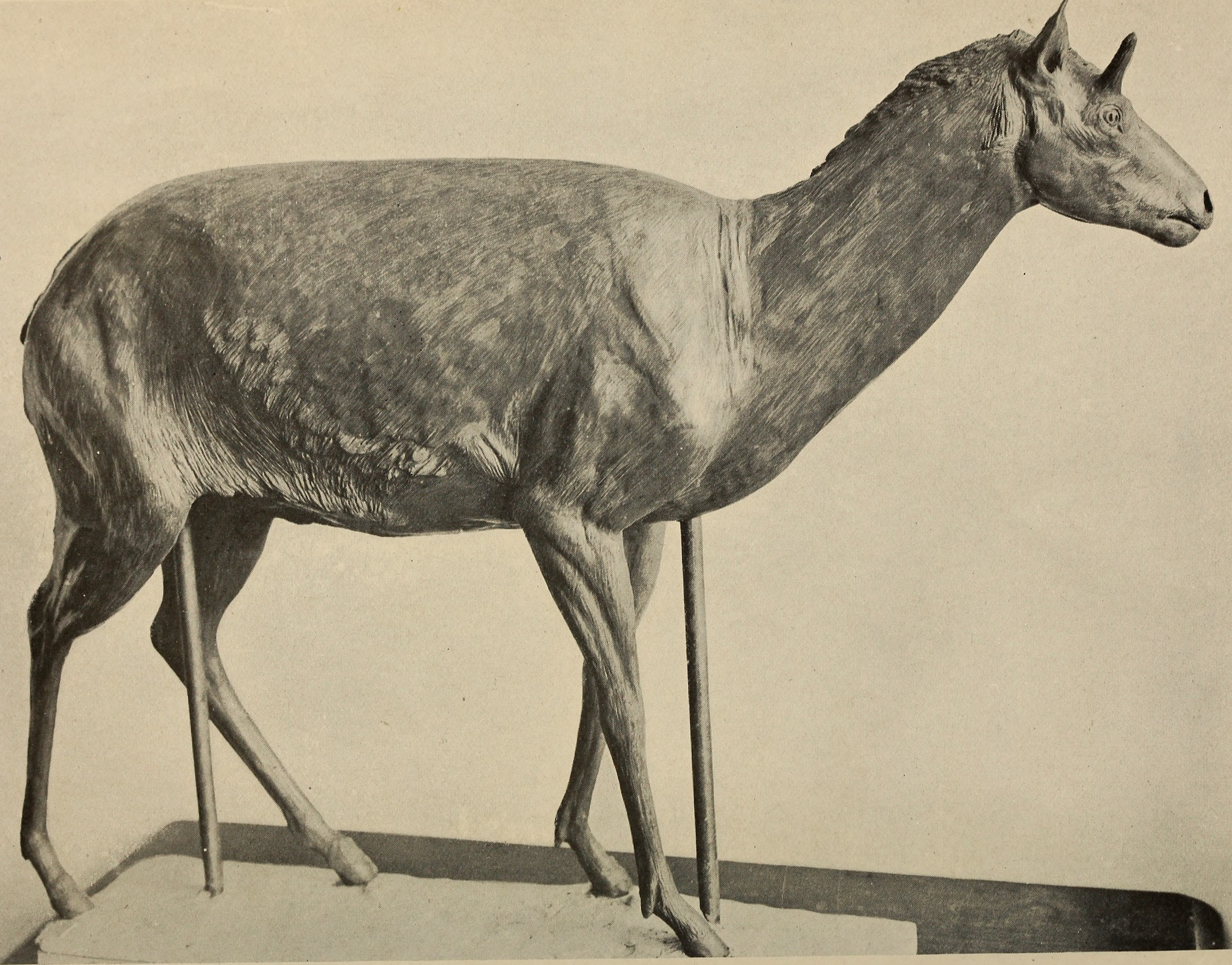
- Restorative model of the Miocene deer relative Aletomeryx
  †Aletomeryx
  - †Aletomeryx gracilis – type locality for species
  - †Aletomeryx marslandensis – type locality for species
- †Alforjas
- †Alilepus
  - †Alilepus vagus
- Alligator
  - †Alligator mcgrewi – type locality for species
  - †Alligator mefferdi – type locality for species
  - †Alligator thomsoni – type locality for species
- †Allomys
  - †Allomys harkseni
- †Allophaiomys
- †Alluvisorex
  - †Alluvisorex arcadentes – or unidentified comparable form
- A living Alnus, or alder tree
  Alnus
- †Alphagaulus
  - †Alphagaulus tedfordi – type locality for species
  - †Alphagaulus vetus
- †Alwoodia
  - †Alwoodia magna – or unidentified comparable form
- †Ambrosia
- †Ambystoma
  - †Ambystoma maculatum
  - †Ambystoma minshalli – type locality for species
  - †Ambystoma priscum – type locality for species
  - †Ambystoma tigrinum
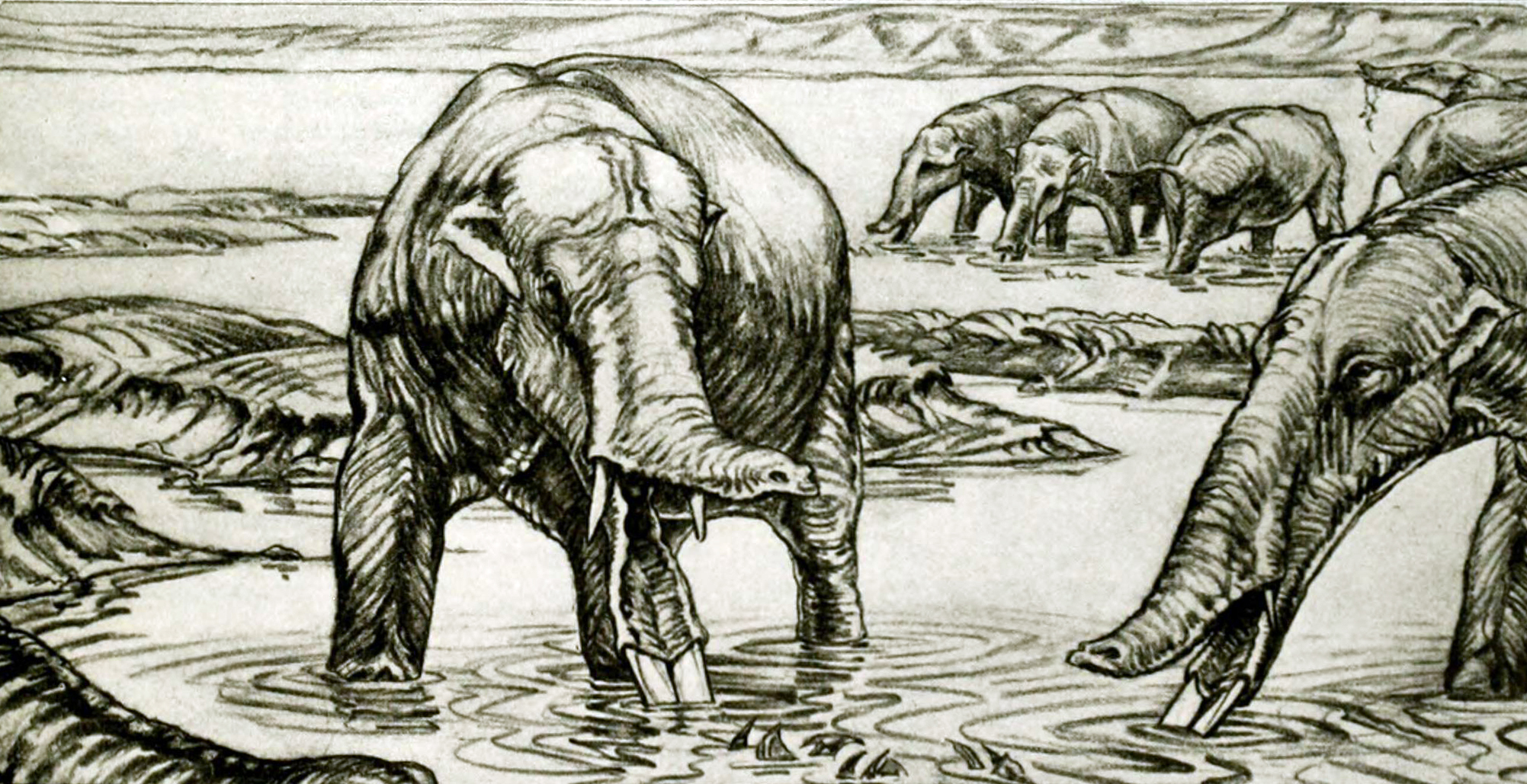
- Life restoration of the Miocene elephant relative Amebelodon. Margret Flinsch (1932).
  †Amebelodon
  - †Amebelodon fricki – type locality for species
- †Ameiseophis
  - †Ameiseophis robinsoni
- Amia
  - †Amia calva
- Ammospermophilus
  - †Ammospermophilus junturensis
- †Amphechinus
- †Amphicyon
  - †Amphicyon frendens – type locality for species
  - †Amphicyon galushai – type locality for species
  - †Amphicyon ingens
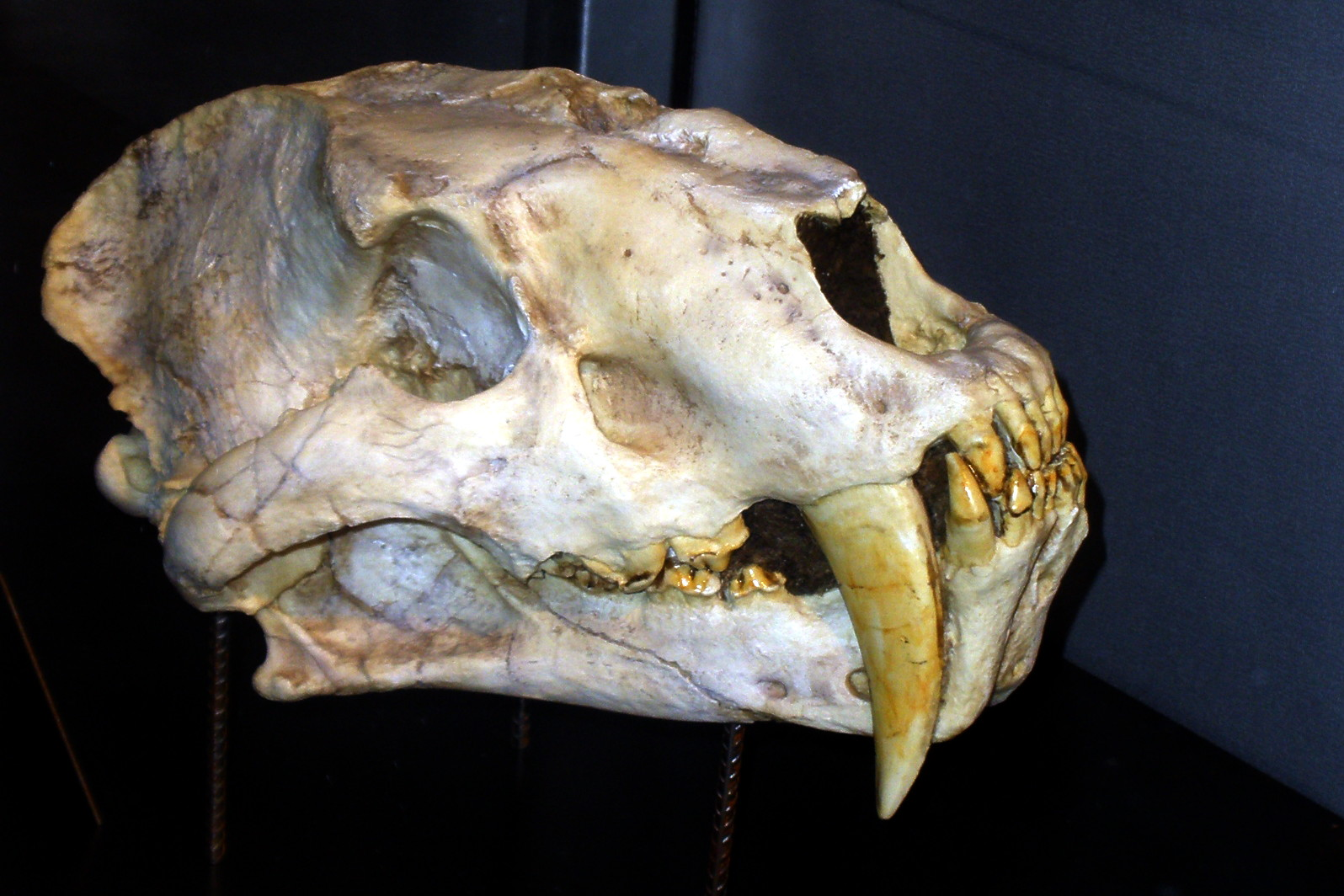
- Fossilized skull of the Miocene saber-toothed cat Amphimachairodus
  †Amphimachairodus
  - †Amphimachairodus coloradensis
- †Anchigyps
  - †Anchigyps voorhiesi
- †Anchitheriomys
  - †Anchitheriomys fluminis
  - †Anchitheriomys nanus
  - †Anchitheriomys stouti – type locality for species
- †Anchitherium
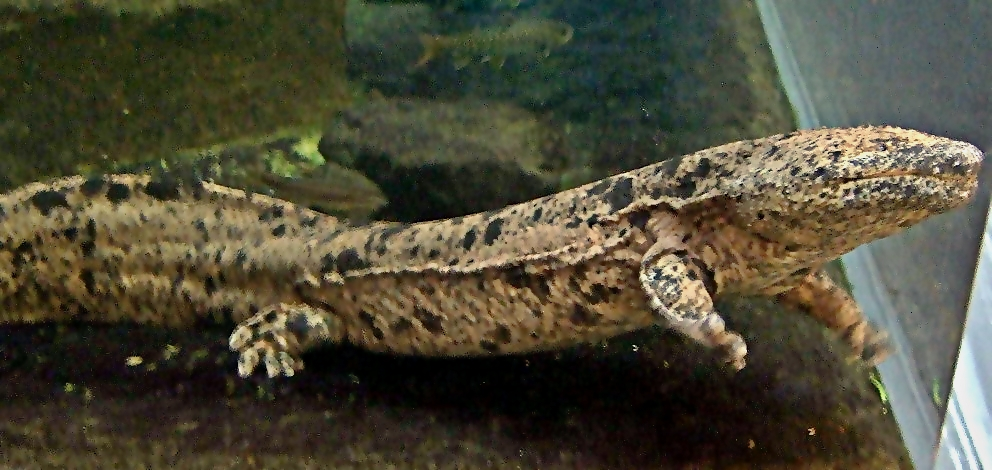
- A living Andrias giant salamander
  †Andrias
  - †Andrias matthewi – type locality for species
- †Anilioides
  - †Anilioides nebraskensis – type locality for species
- †Ankylodon
  - †Ankylodon annectens
- †Antecalomys
  - †Antecalomys phthanus – type locality for species
- †Antesorex
  - †Antesorex wilsoni – type locality for species
- Antrozous – or unidentified comparable form
- Apalone
  - †Apalone miocaenus – type locality for species
  - †Apalone spinifera
- †Apatemys
  - †Apatemys downsi – or unidentified related form
- †Aphelops
  - †Aphelops megalodus
  - †Aphelops mutilus – type locality for species
- †Apletotomeus
  - †Apletotomeus crassus – type locality for species
- Aplodinotus
  - †Aplodinotus grunniens
- †Apternodus
- †Aramornis
  - †Aramornis longurio – type locality for species
- Aramus
- †Archaeocyon
  - †Archaeocyon leptodus
  - †Archaeocyon pavidus
- †Archaeohippus
  - †Archaeohippus penultimus – type locality for species
- †Archaeolagus
  - †Archaeolagus primigenius – or unidentified comparable form
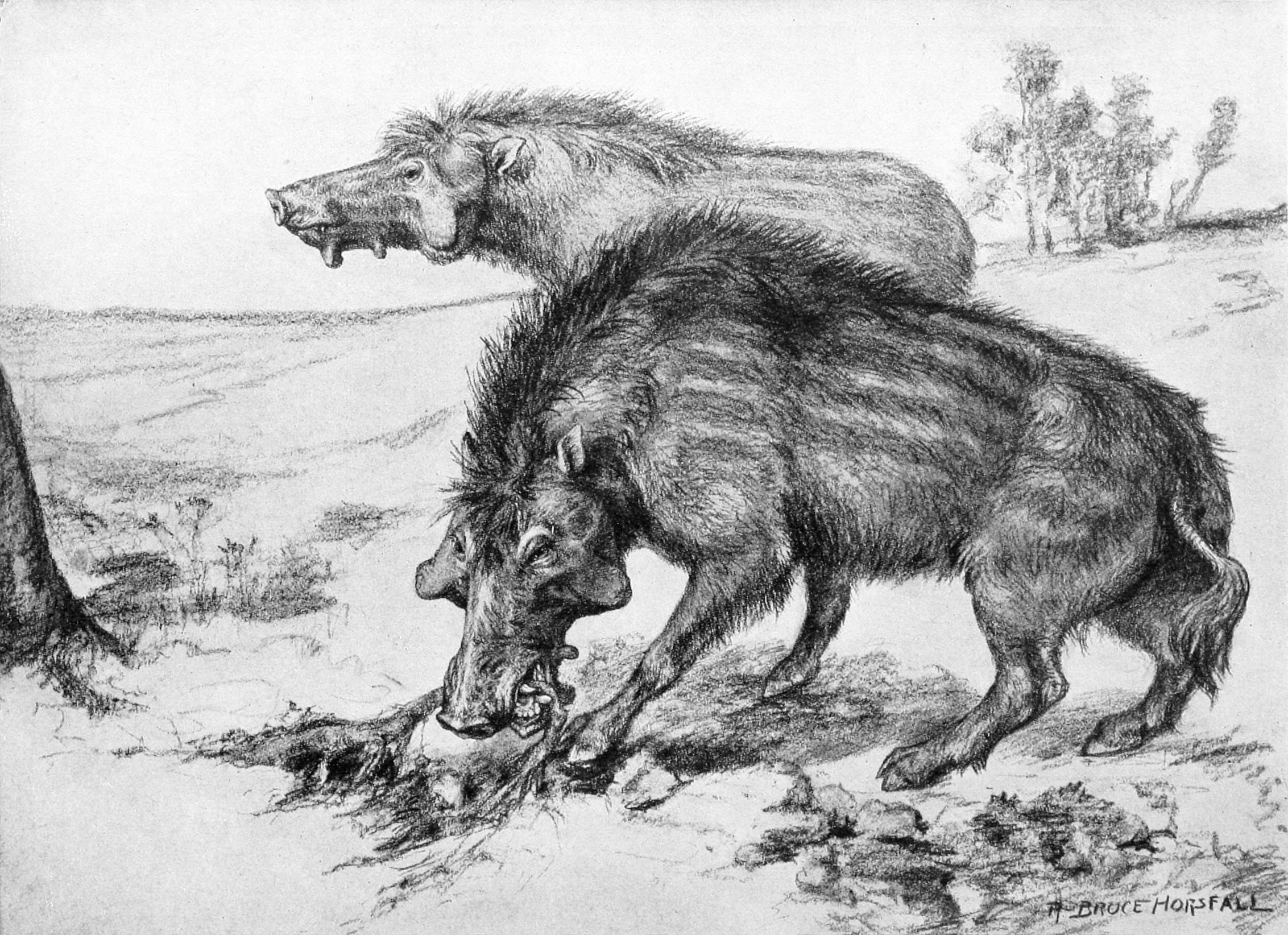
- Life restoration of the Eocene-Oligocene entelodont mammal Archaeotherium
  †Archaeotherium
  - †Archaeotherium mortoni
- †Arctodus
  - †Arctodus simus
- Arctomys
  - †Arctomys vetus
- †Arctonasua
  - †Arctonasua eurybates – type locality for species
  - †Arctonasua gracilis – type locality for species
  - †Arctonasua minima – type locality for species
- Ardea
- †Arikareeomys
  - †Arikareeomys skinneri – type locality for species
- Arizona
  - †Arizona voorhiesi – type locality for species
- †Arretotherium
  - †Arretotherium acridens
  - †Arretotherium fricki – type locality for species
- †Artemisia
- †Astrohippus
- Atractosteus
  - †Atractosteus spatula
- †Aulolithomys
  - †Aulolithomys bounites

== B ==
- Baiomys
- Balearica
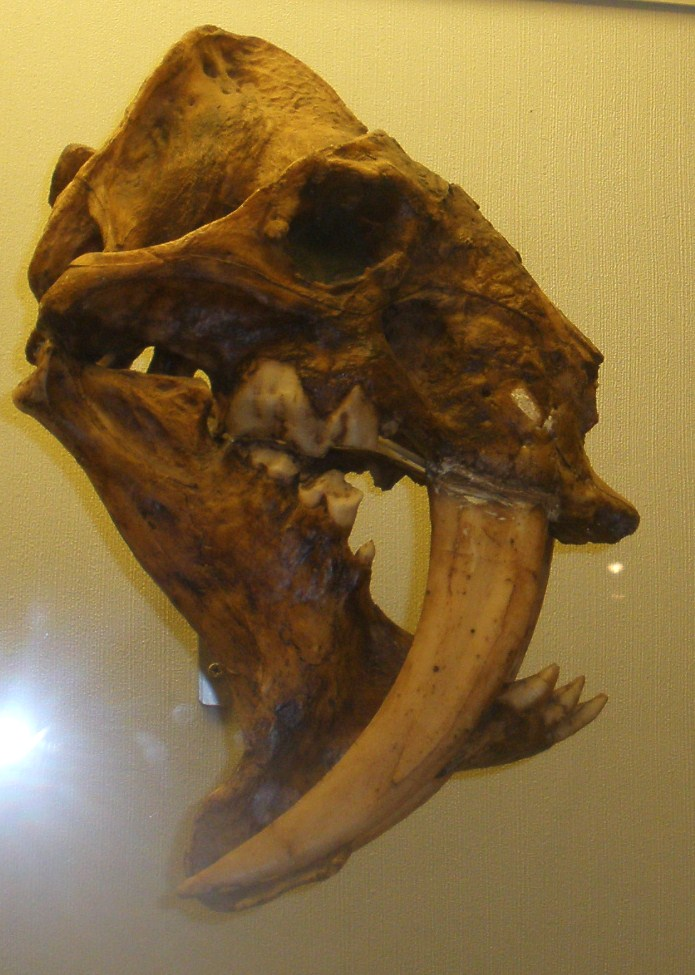
- Fossilized skull of the Miocene-Pliocene false saber-toothed cat Barbourofelis
  †Barbourofelis
  - †Barbourofelis fricki
  - †Barbourofelis morrisi – type locality for species
  - †Barbourofelis whitfordi – type locality for species
- †Barbouromeryx
  - †Barbouromeryx trigonocorneus
- Bassariscus
  - †Bassariscus antiquus – type locality for species
  - †Bassariscus minimus – type locality for species
  - †Bassariscus ogallalae – type locality for species
- †Bathornis
  - †Bathornis veredus
- †Bathygenys
- †Bensonomys
  - †Bensonomys meadensis
- Betula – or unidentified comparable form
- Bison
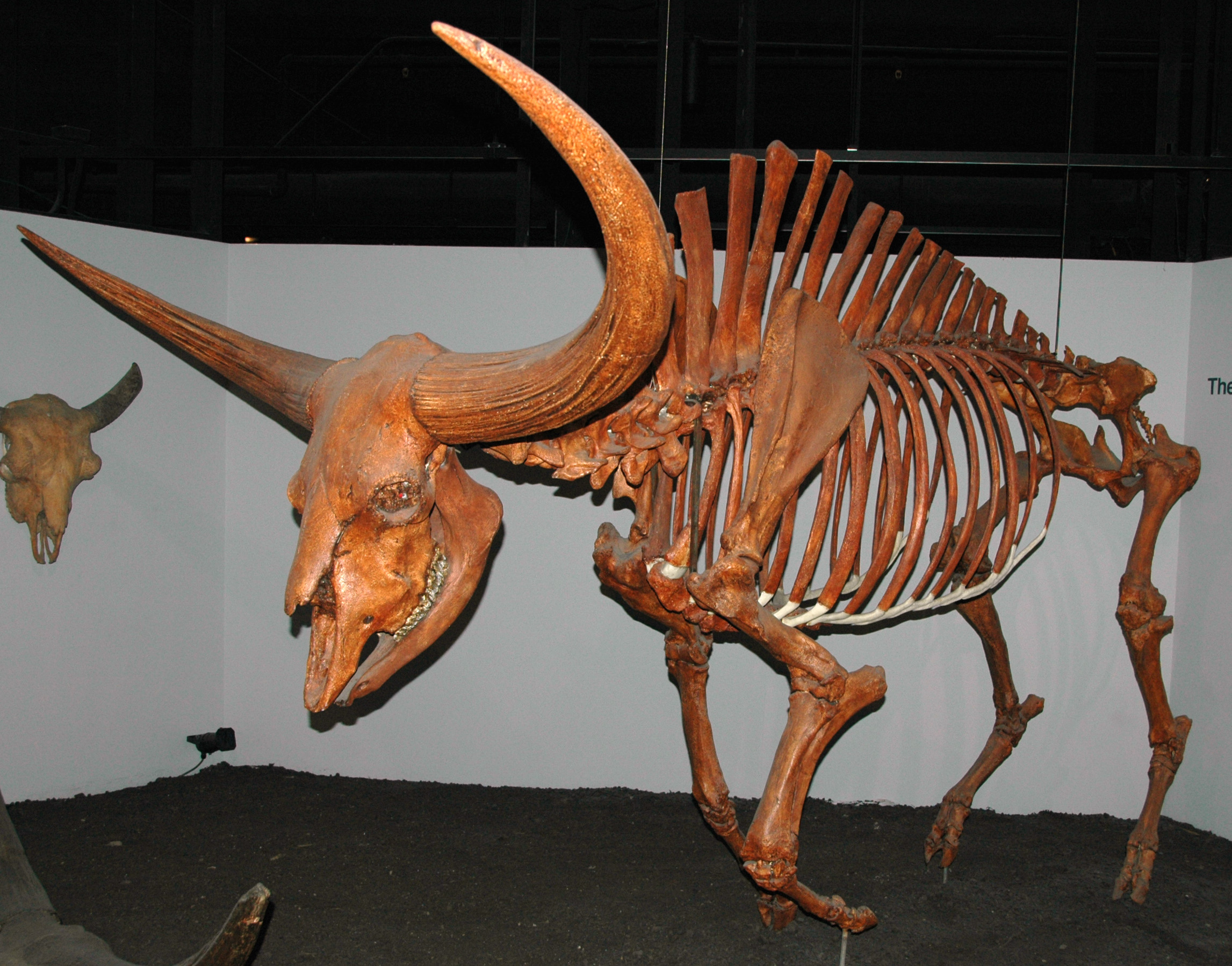
  - Mounted fossilized skeleton of the Pleistocene Bison latifrons, also known as the giant bison or long-horned bison
    †Bison latifrons
- †Blackia
- †Blacktops – type locality for genus
  - †Blacktops latidens – type locality for species
  - †Blacktops longinares – type locality for species
- Blarina
  - †Blarina brevicauda
- †Blastomeryx
  - †Blastomeryx gemmifer – type locality for species
- †Bootherium
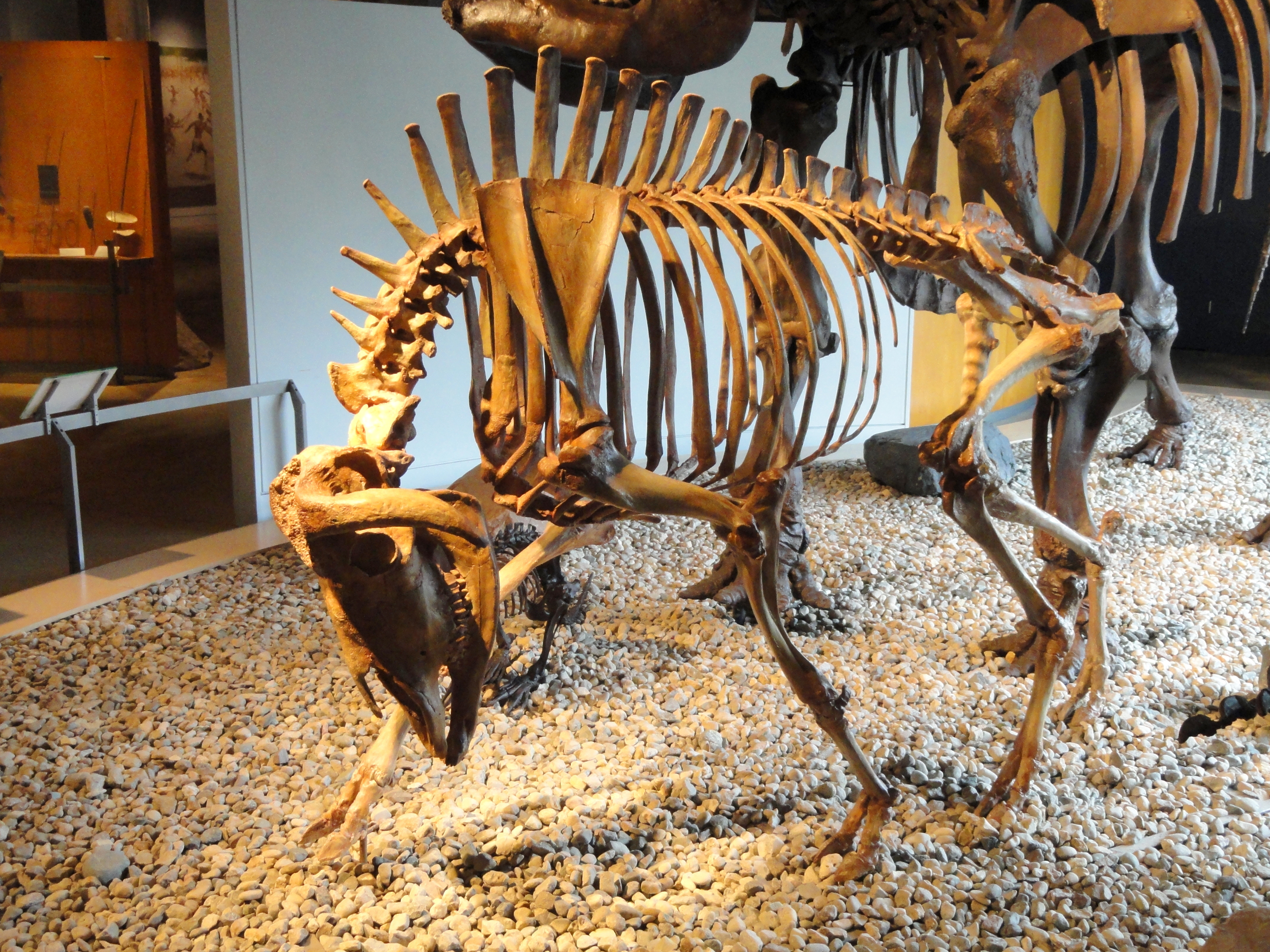
  - Fossilized skeleton of the Pleistocene-Holocene bovid Bootherium bombifrons, or Harlan's musk ox.
    †Bootherium bombifrons – type locality for species
- †Boreortalis
  - †Boreortalis phengitis – type locality for species
- †Borophagus
  - †Borophagus diversidens
  - †Borophagus pugnator
  - †Borophagus secundus
- †Bothriodon
  - †Bothriodon americanus
- †Bouromeryx
  - †Bouromeryx americanus
  - †Bouromeryx submilleri – type locality for species
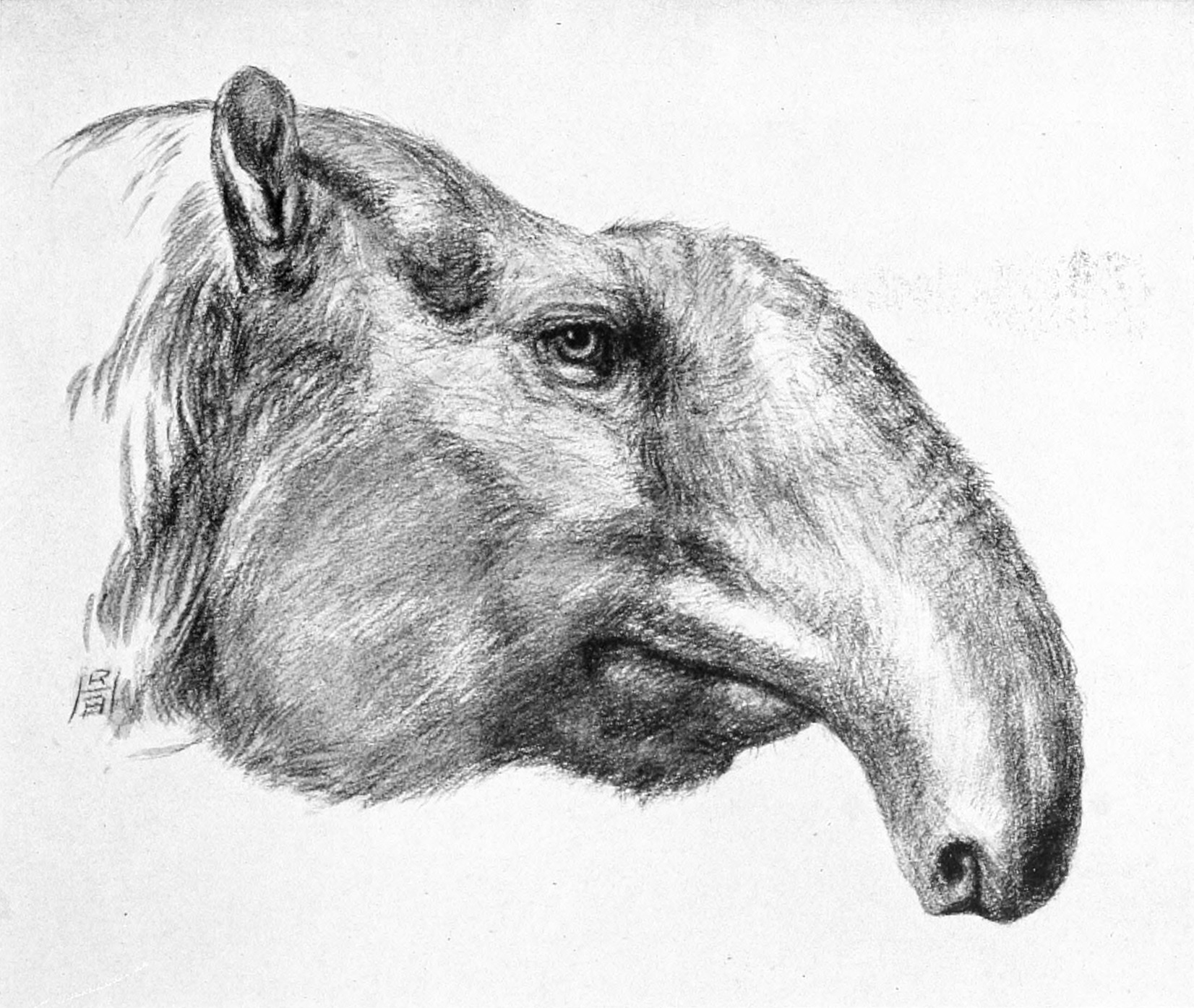
- Restorative portrait of the Miocene oreodont mammal Brachycrus
  †Brachycrus
  - †Brachycrus buwaldi
  - †Brachycrus siouense – type locality for species
  - †Brachycrus wilsoni – type locality for species
- †Brachyerix
  - †Brachyerix incertis – type locality for species
  - †Brachyerix macrotis
  - †Brachyerix richi – type locality for species
- †Brachyopsigale
  - †Brachyopsigale dubius – or unidentified comparable form
- †Brachypsalis
  - †Brachypsalis hyaenoides – type locality for species
  - †Brachypsalis matutinus – type locality for species
  - †Brachypsalis modicus
  - †Brachypsalis obliquidens – type locality for species
  - †Brachypsalis pachycephalus
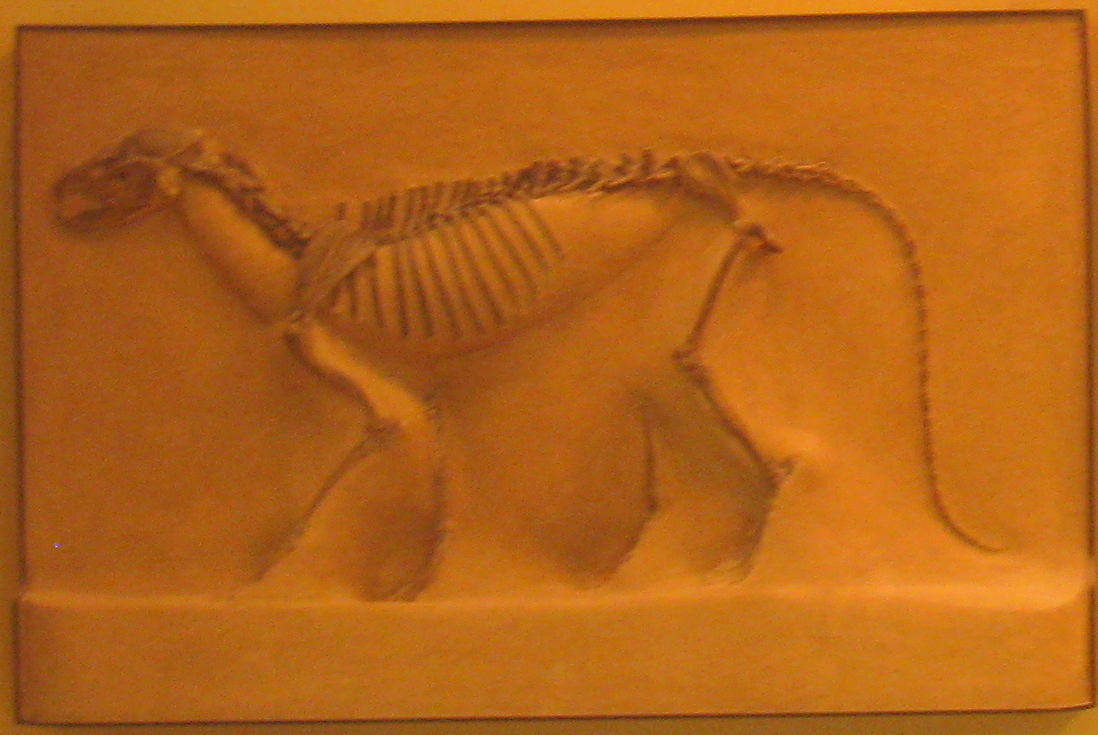
- Skeletal reconstruction of the Eocene-Oligocene bear-dog Brachyrhynchocyon
  †Brachyrhynchocyon
  - †Brachyrhynchocyon dodgei
- †Bretzia – tentative report
- †Brontops
  - †Brontops brachycephalus
  - †Brontops dispar – type locality for species
- Bufo
  - †Bufo cognatus
  - †Bufo hibbardi
  - †Bufo holmani – type locality for species
  - †Bufo kuhrei – type locality for species
  - †Bufo pliocompactilis
  - †Bufo repentinus
  - †Bufo rexroadensis
  - †Bufo spongifrons – or unidentified comparable form
  - †Bufo valentinensis – type locality for species
- †Buisnictis
  - †Buisnictis burrowsi
  - †Buisnictis schoffi
- Burhinus
  - †Burhinus lucorum – type locality for species
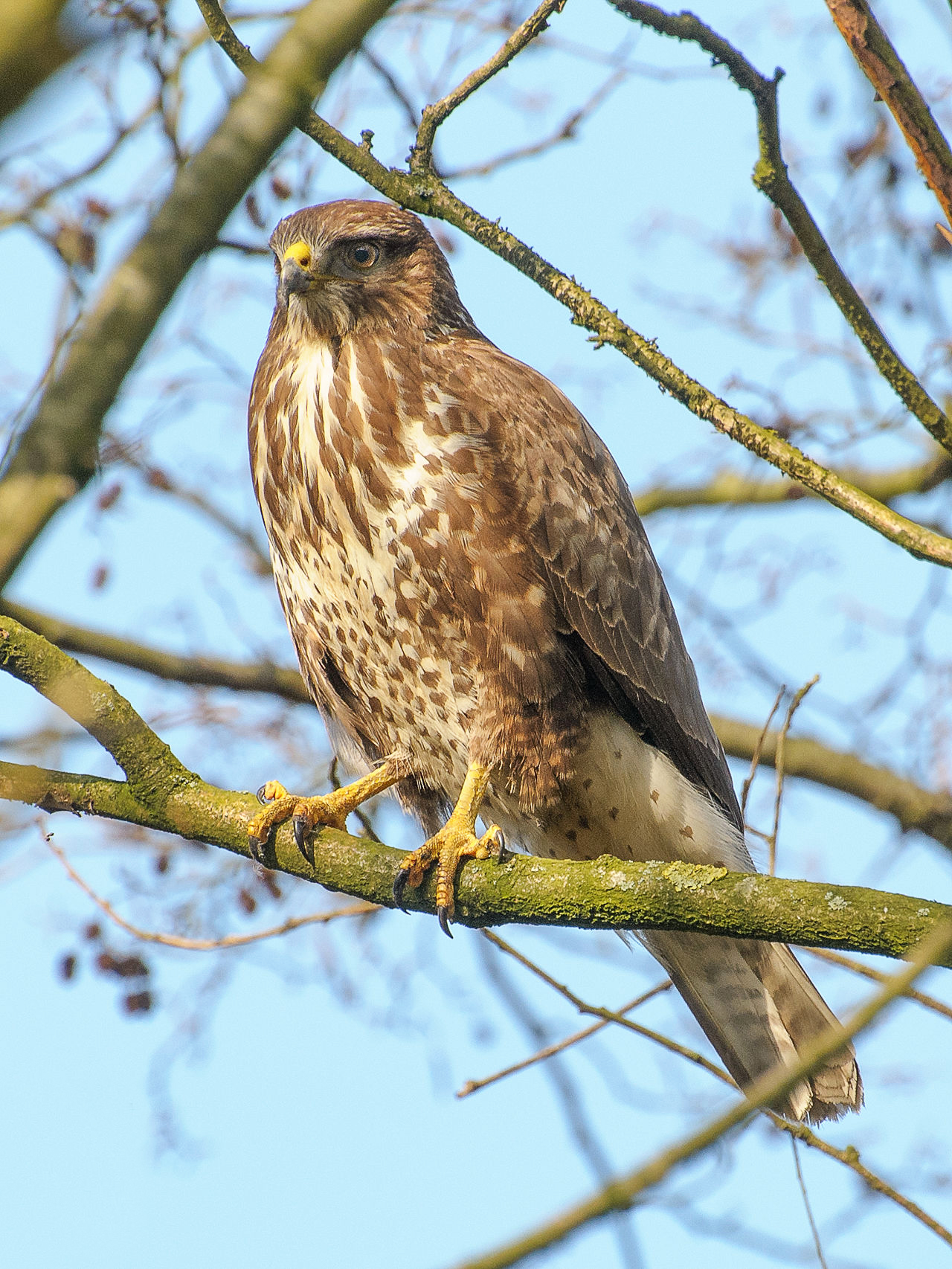
- A living Buteo hawk
  Buteo
  - †Buteo conterminus – type locality for species
  - †Buteo typhoius

== C ==
- †Calamagras
  - †Calamagras angulatus
  - †Calamagras murivorus
  - †Calamagras platyspondyla – type locality for species
- †Calippus
  - †Calippus cerasinus
  - †Calippus large informal
  - †Calippus martini
  - †Calippus placidus
  - †Calippus proplacidus
  - †Calippus regulus
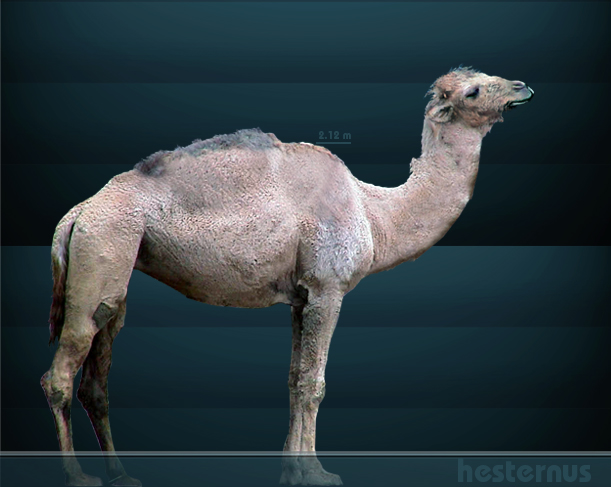
- Life restoration of the Pliocene-Holocene camel Camelops
  †Camelops
  - †Camelops hesternus
- †Campestrallomys
  - †Campestrallomys annectens – type locality for species
  - †Campestrallomys siouxensis – type locality for species
- Canis
  - †Canis dirus
  - †Canis edwardii
  - †Canis ferox
  - †Canis latrans
  - †Canis lepophagus
- †Capacikala
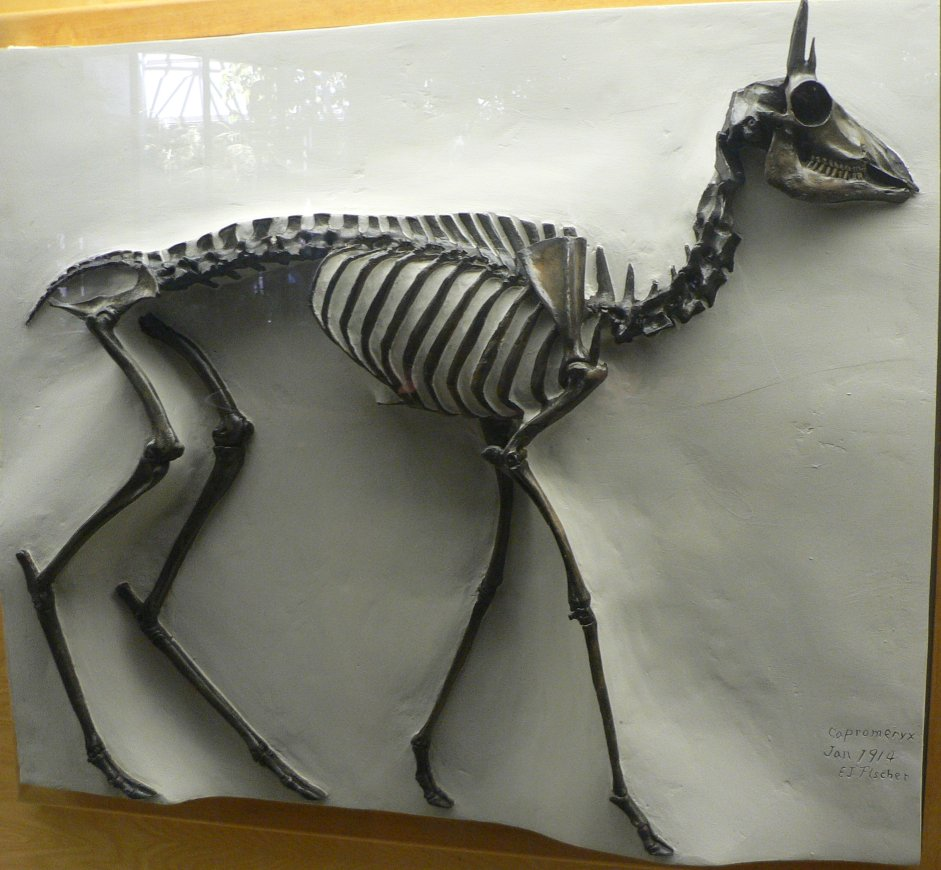
- Fossilized skeleton of the Pleistocene dwarf pronghorn Capromeryx
  †Capromeryx
  - †Capromeryx arizonensis
  - †Capromeryx furcifer
  - †Capromeryx tauntonensis
- †Carpocyon
  - †Carpocyon compressus
  - †Carpocyon limosus
  - †Carpocyon robustus
  - †Carpocyon webbi – type locality for species
- Carya
  - †Carya libbeyi
- Castor
  - †Castor californicus – or unidentified comparable form
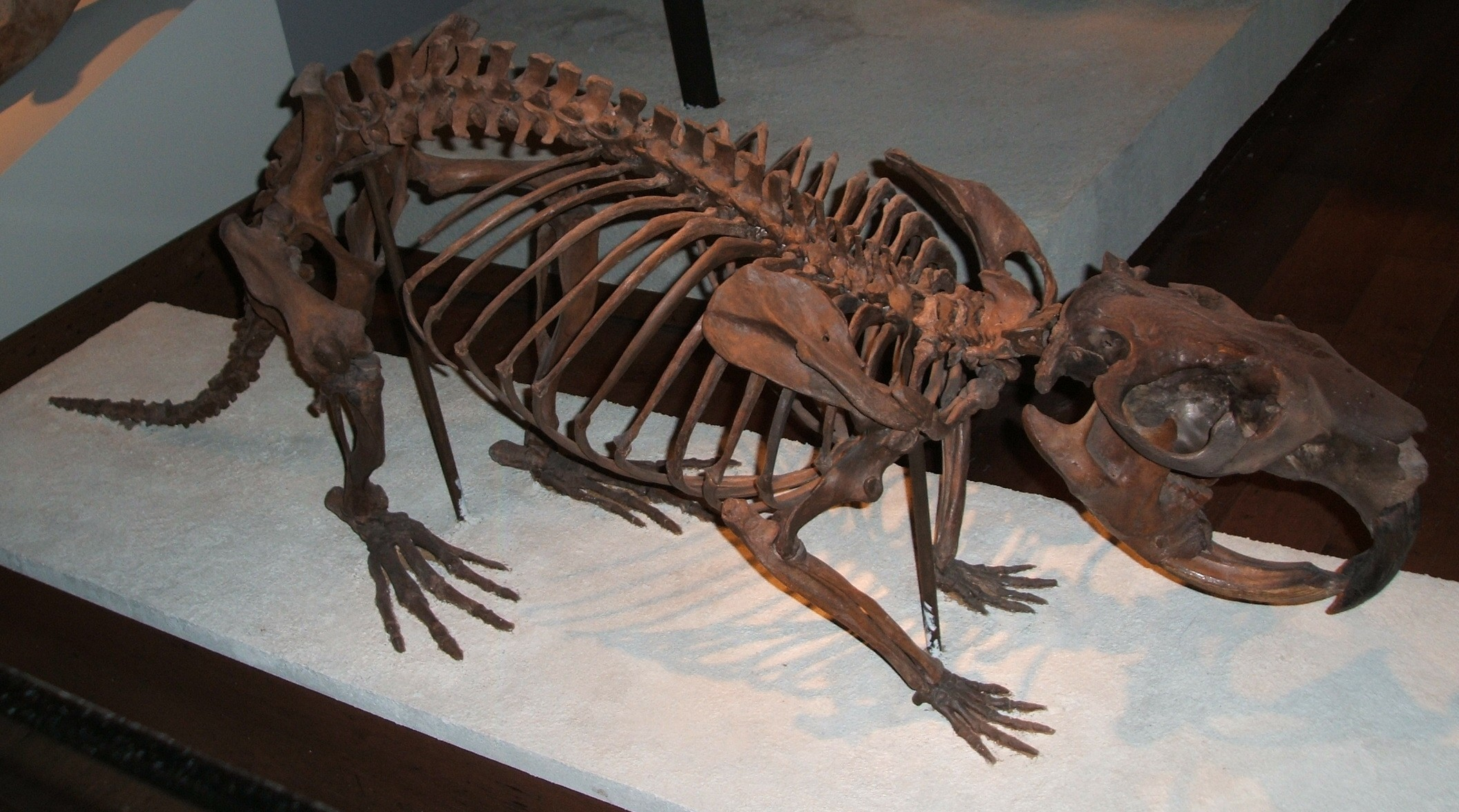
- Mounted fossilized skeleton of the Pliocene-Pleistocene giant beaver Castoroides
  †Castoroides
- Cedrela
  - †Cedrela trainii
- †Cedromus
  - †Cedromus savannae – type locality for species
  - †Cedromus wardi
- Celtis
  - †Celtis kansana
- †Centetodon
  - †Centetodon chadronensis
  - †Centetodon divaricatus – type locality for species
  - †Centetodon hendryi
  - †Centetodon magnus
  - †Centetodon marginalis
- †Centimanomys
  - †Centimanomys major
- †Cephalogale
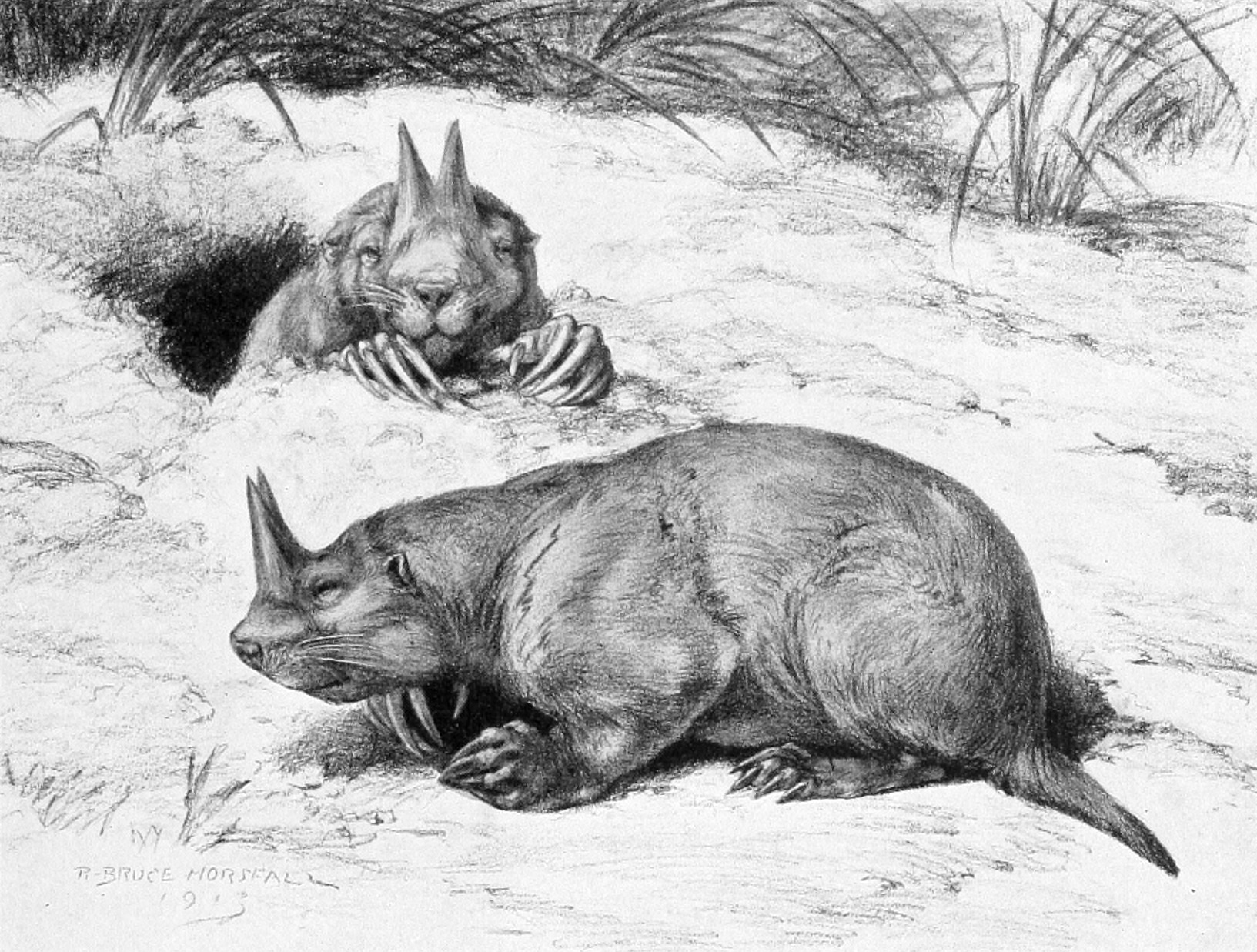
- Life restoration of the Miocene-Pleistocene horned gopher Ceratogaulus. Robert Bruce Horsfall (1913).
  †Ceratogaulus
  - †Ceratogaulus anecdotus
  - †Ceratogaulus hatcheri
  - †Ceratogaulus rhinocerus
- †Cervalces
- †Chadronia – type locality for genus
  - †Chadronia margaretae – type locality for species
- †Chadronycteris
  - †Chadronycteris rabenae – type locality for species
- Chaetodipus
  - †Chaetodipus hispidus
- †Chamaecyparis
  - †Chamaecyparis linguaefolia
- Charina
  - †Charina prebottae
- †Cheilophis
  - †Cheilophis huerfanoensis
- Chelydra
  - †Chelydra serpentina
- †Chelydrops
  - †Chelydrops stricta – type locality for species
- Chrysemys
  - †Chrysemys picta
- †Chumashius
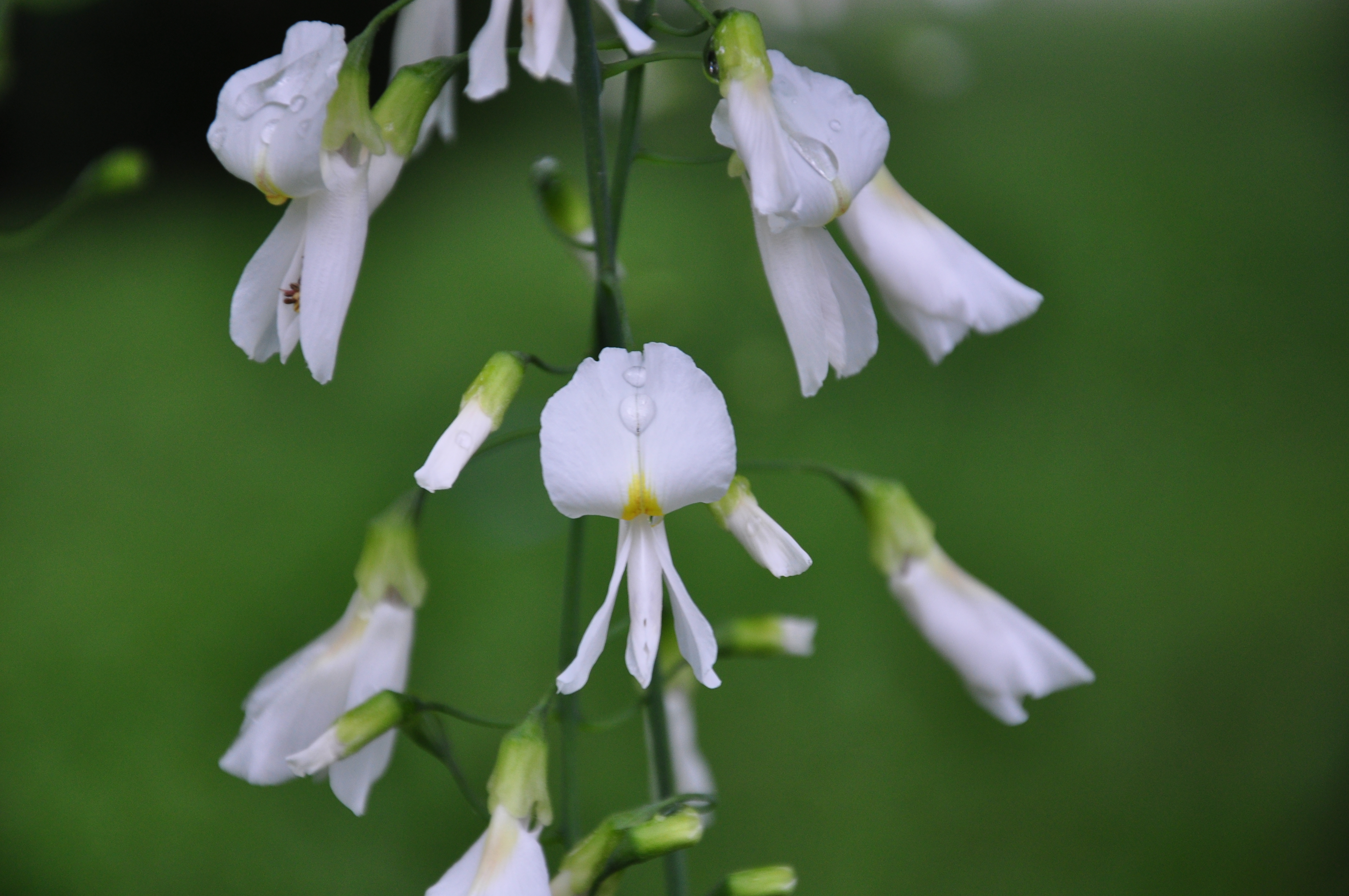
- Flowers of a living Cladrastis, or yellowwood
  Cladrastis
  - †Cladrastis prelutea – type locality for species
- Clethrionomys
  - †Clethrionomys gapperi – or unidentified comparable form
- Cnemidophorus
  - †Cnemidophorus sexlineatus
- Cocculus
  - †Cocculus rotunda – type locality for species
- †Colodon
  - †Colodon cingulatus
  - †Colodon occidentalis
- Coluber
  - †Coluber constrictor
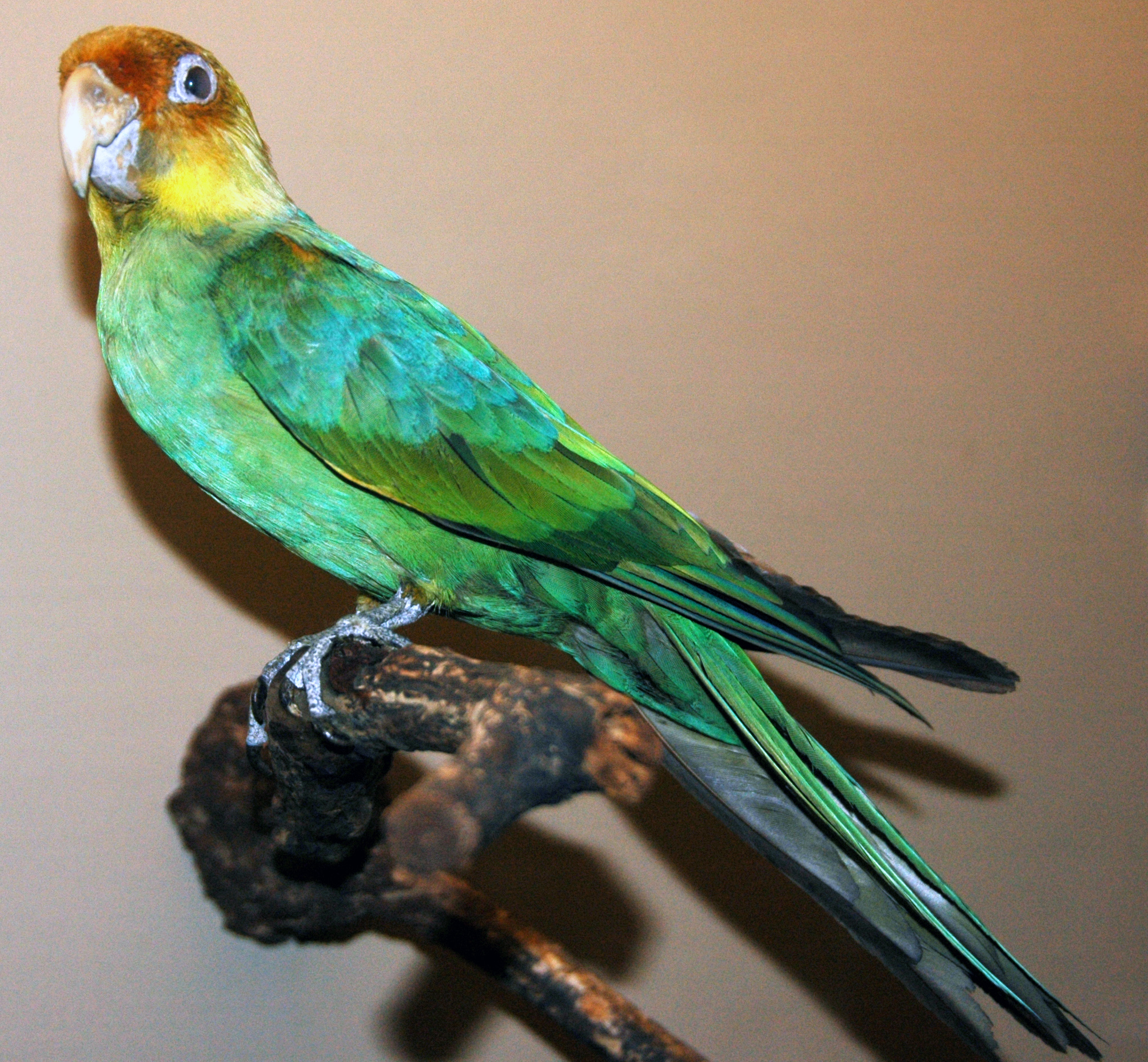
- A taxidermied Conuropsis carolinensis, or Carolina parakeet
  †Conuropsis
  - †Conuropsis fratercula – type locality for species
- †Copedelphys
  - †Copedelphys stevensoni
- †Copemys
  - †Copemys lindsayi
  - †Copemys longidens
  - †Copemys mariae
  - †Copemys pisinnus
  - †Copemys shotwelli
- †Cordia
  - †Cordia prealba – type locality for species
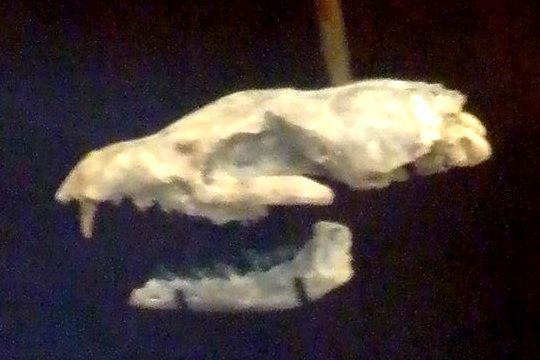
- Fossilized skull of the Oligocene-Miocene bone-crushing dog Cormocyon
  †Cormocyon
  - †Cormocyon copei
  - †Cormocyon haydeni
- †Cormohipparion
  - †Cormohipparion goorisi
  - †Cormohipparion johnsoni – type locality for species
  - †Cormohipparion matthewi – type locality for species
  - †Cormohipparion merriami – type locality for species
  - †Cormohipparion occidentale
  - †Cormohipparion quinni
- †Cosoryx
  - †Cosoryx furcatus
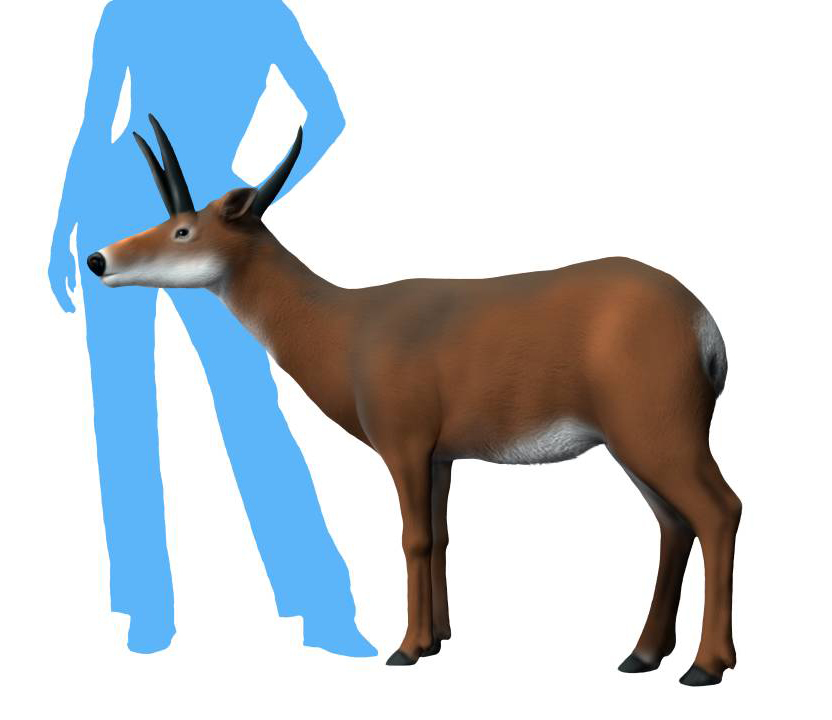
- Restoration of the Miocene palaeomerycid Cranioceras, a relative of modern deer, with anachronistic human to scale
  †Cranioceras
  - †Cranioceras unicornis
- Crataegus
  - †Crataegus nupta
- †Craterogale – type locality for genus
  - †Craterogale simus – type locality for species
- Crotalus
  - †Crotalus horridus
- †Crusafontina
  - †Crusafontina magna
- Cryptotis
- †Crytonyx
  - †Crytonyx cooki – type locality for species
- †Cupidinimus
  - †Cupidinimus nebraskensis
  - †Cupidinimus prattensis – type locality for species
  - †Cupidinimus tertius – or unidentified comparable form
- †Cylindrodon
  - †Cylindrodon nebraskensis
- †Cynarctoides
  - †Cynarctoides acridens
  - †Cynarctoides emryi – type locality for species
  - †Cynarctoides roii
- †Cynarctus
  - †Cynarctus crucidens – type locality for species
  - †Cynarctus saxatilis
  - †Cynarctus voorhiesi – type locality for species
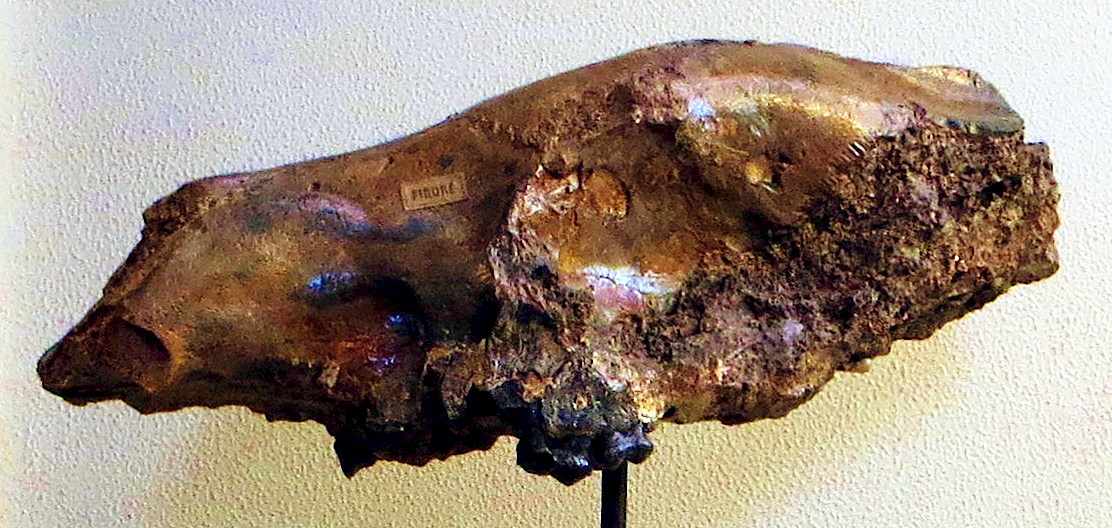
- Fossilized cranium of the Miocene bear-dog Cynelos
  †Cynelos
  - †Cynelos idoneus
  - †Cynelos sinapius
- †Cynodesmus
  - †Cynodesmus martini – type locality for species
  - †Cynodesmus thooides
- †Cynomyoides
  - †Cynomyoides vatis – type locality for species
- Cynomys
  - †Cynomys niobrarius
  - †Cynomys sappaensis – type locality for species
  - †Cynomys spenceri – type locality for species

== D ==
- †Dakotaophis
  - †Dakotaophis greeni
- †Daphoenictis
  - †Daphoenictis tedfordi
- †Daphoenodon
  - †Daphoenodon falkenbachi
  - †Daphoenodon niobrarensis – type locality for species
  - †Daphoenodon robustum
  - †Daphoenodon superbus
- Life restoration of the Eocene-Miocene bear dog Daphoenus
  †Daphoenus – type locality for genus
  - †Daphoenus felinus
  - †Daphoenus hartshornianus
  - †Daphoenus vetus – type locality for species
- Dasypus
  - †Dasypus bellus
- †Delotrochanter
  - †Delotrochanter oryktes – type locality for species
  - †Delotrochanter petersoni
- †Desmatippus
  - †Desmatippus integer
  - †Desmatippus nebrascensis – type locality for species
  - †Desmatippus nebraskensis
  - †Desmatippus tyleri – type locality for species
- †Desmatochoerus
  - †Desmatochoerus megalodon
- †Desmatolagus
  - †Desmatolagus gazini – type locality for species
- †Desmocyon
  - †Desmocyon matthewi
  - †Desmocyon thomsoni
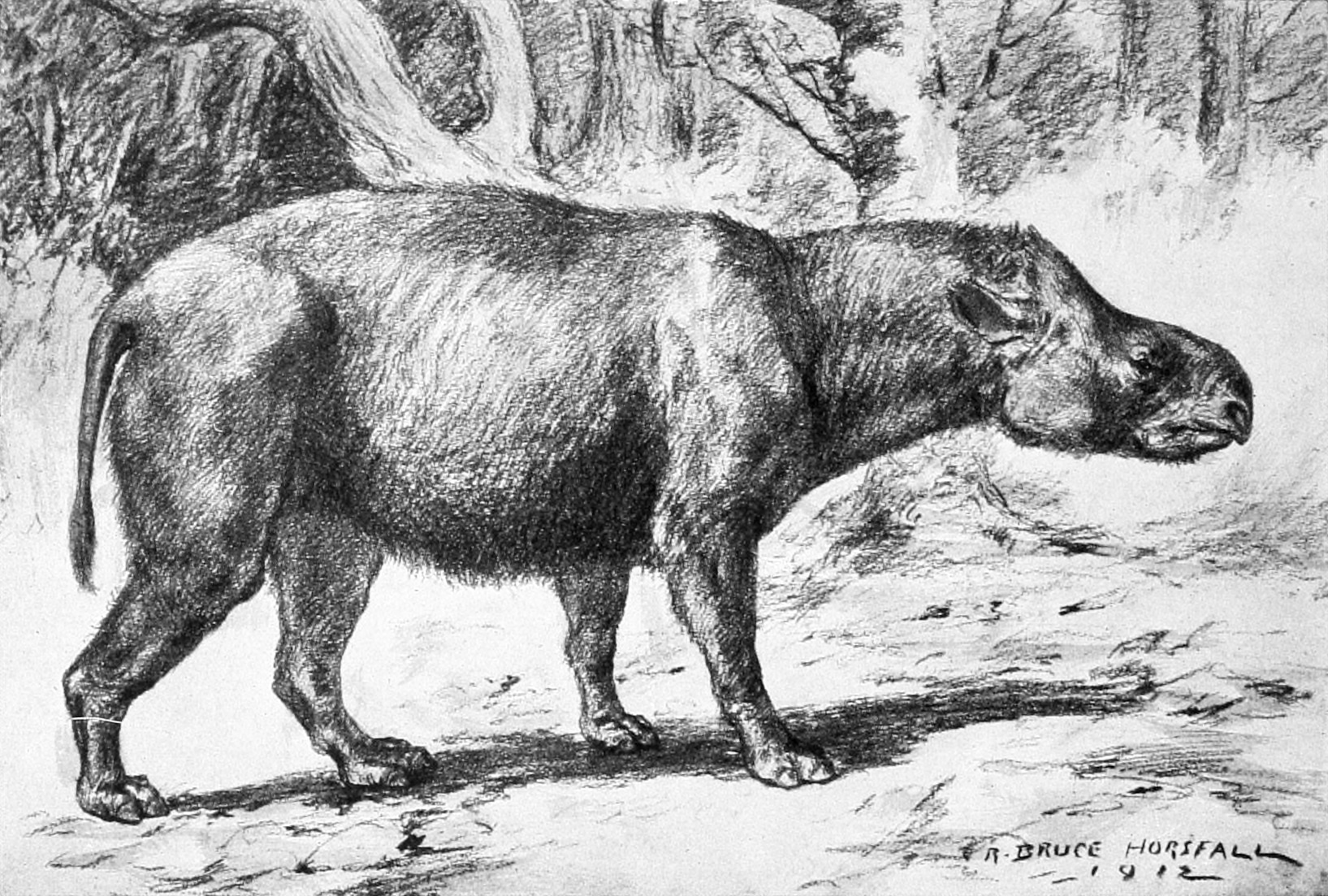
- Restoration of the Oligocene-Miocene hornless rhinoceros Diceratherium. Robert Bruce Horsfall (1913).
  †Diceratherium
  - †Diceratherium annectens
  - †Diceratherium armatum
  - †Diceratherium niobrarense – type locality for species
  - †Diceratherium radtkei
- Dicrostonyx
  - †Dicrostonyx torquatus
- †Dikkomys
  - †Dikkomys matthewi – type locality for species
- †Dinictis
  - †Dinictis felina
- †Dinogale
  - †Dinogale siouxensis – type locality for species
- †Dinohippus
  - †Dinohippus leidyanus – type locality for species
- †Dinohyus
  - †Dinohyus hollandi – type locality for species
- †Diospyros
  - †Diospyros miotexana – type locality for species
- †Diplolophus
  - †Diplolophus insolens
- Dipodomys
- †Dipoides
  - †Dipoides rexroadensis
  - †Dipoides stirtoni
  - †Dipoides tanneri – type locality for species
  - †Dipoides williamsi
  - †Dipoides wilsoni – or unidentified comparable form
- †Diprionomys
  - †Diprionomys agrarius – type locality for species
- †Domnina
  - †Domnina dakotensis
  - †Domnina gradata
  - †Domnina thompsoni
- †Domninoides
  - †Domninoides mimicus
  - †Domninoides valentinensis – type locality for species
- †Douglassciurus
  - †Douglassciurus jeffersoni
- †Downsimus
  - †Downsimus chadwicki
- †Drepanomeryx
  - †Drepanomeryx falciformis – type locality for species
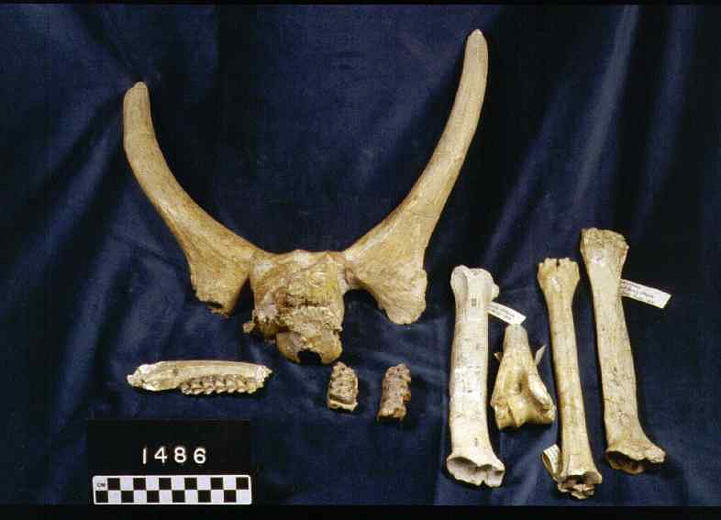
- Fossilized horns, jaws, and limb bones of the Miocene deer relative Dromomeryx
  †Dromomeryx
  - †Dromomeryx borealis – type locality for species

== E ==
- †Ecclesimus
  - †Ecclesimus tenuiceps
- †Ectopocynus
  - †Ectopocynus simplicidens – type locality for species
- †Ectypodus
  - †Ectypodus lovei
- †Edaphocyon
  - †Edaphocyon lautus – type locality for species
- †Ekgmowechashala
  - †Ekgmowechashala philotau
- Elaphe
  - †Elaphe guttata
  - †Elaphe kansensis – or unidentified comparable form
  - †Elaphe nebraskensis – type locality for species
  - †Elaphe obsoleta
  - †Elaphe vulpina
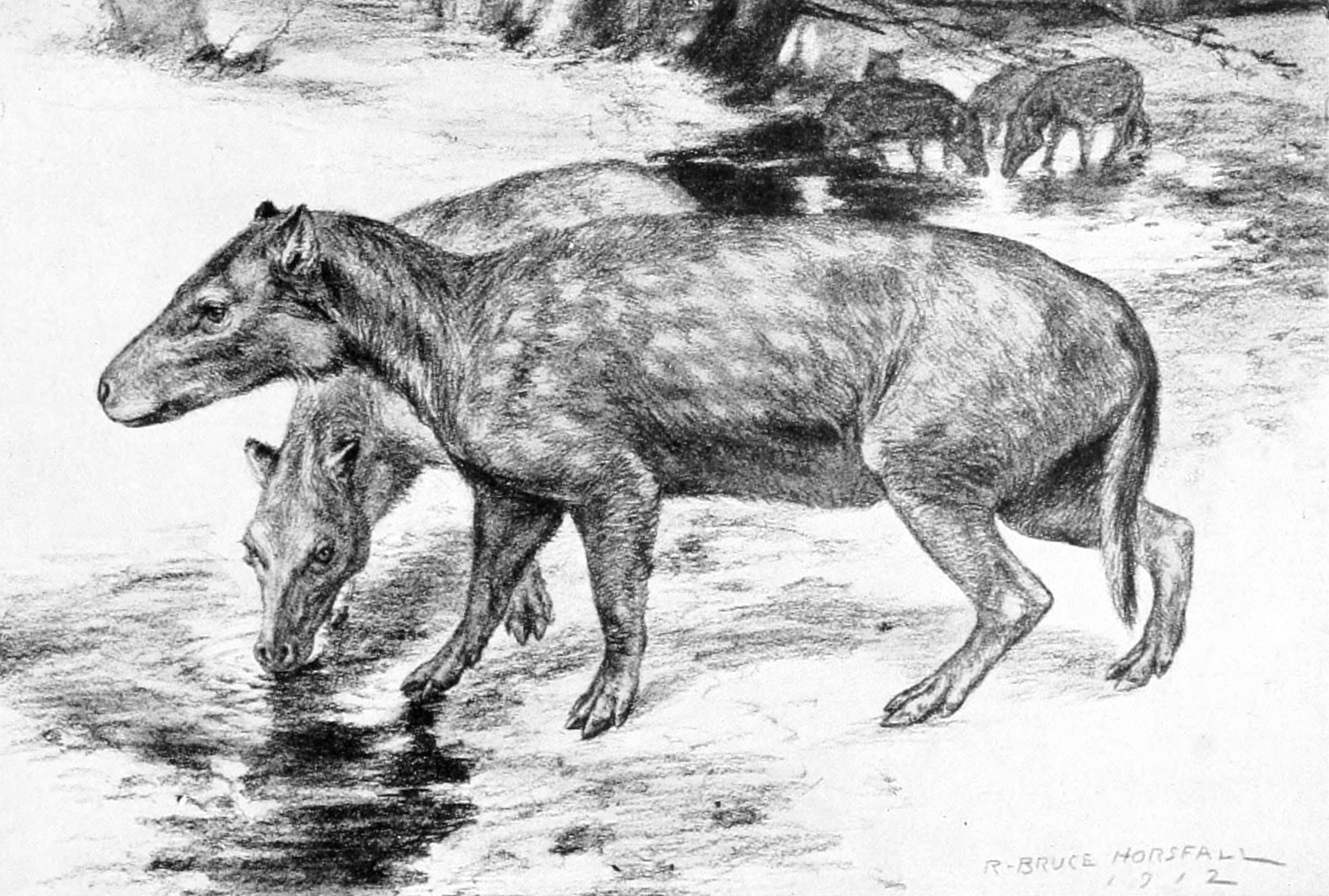
- Life restoration of the Eocene-Oligocene anthracothere mammal Elomeryx
  †Elomeryx – tentative report
- Emydoidea
  - †Emydoidea blandingii
  - †Emydoidea hutchisoni – type locality for species
- †Enhydrocyon
  - †Enhydrocyon pahinsintewakpa
- †Entoptychus
  - †Entoptychus grandiplanus – type locality for species
- †Eotylopus
  - †Eotylopus reedi
- †Epeiromys
  - †Epeiromys spanius – type locality for species
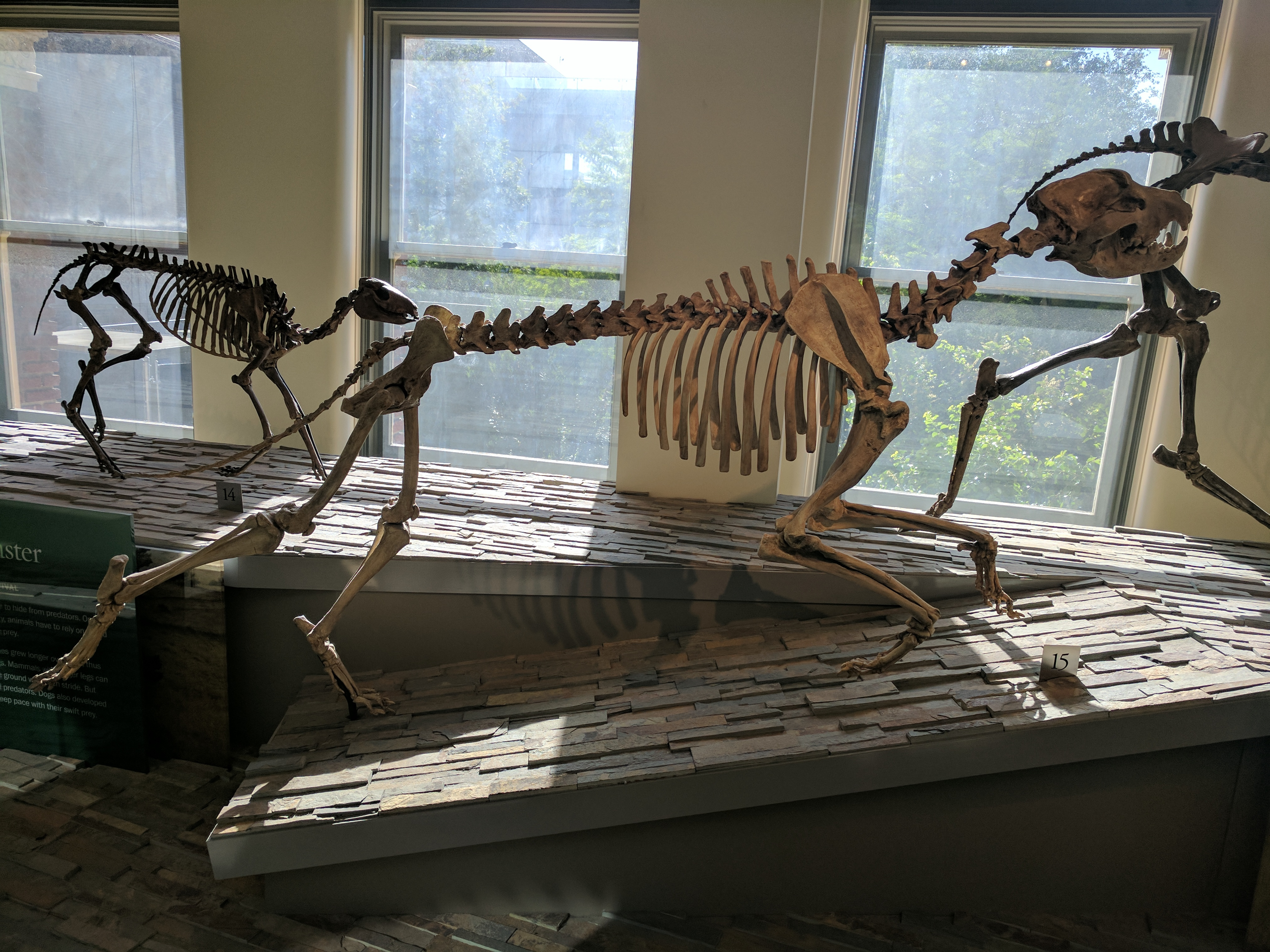
- Mounted fossilized skeleton of the Miocene bone-crushing dog Epicyon
  †Epicyon
  - †Epicyon haydeni
  - †Epicyon saevus
- Equus
  - †Equus conversidens – or unidentified comparable form
  - †Equus excelsus
  - †Equus francisci
  - †Equus simplicidens
- Erethizon
  - †Erethizon dorsatum
- Esox
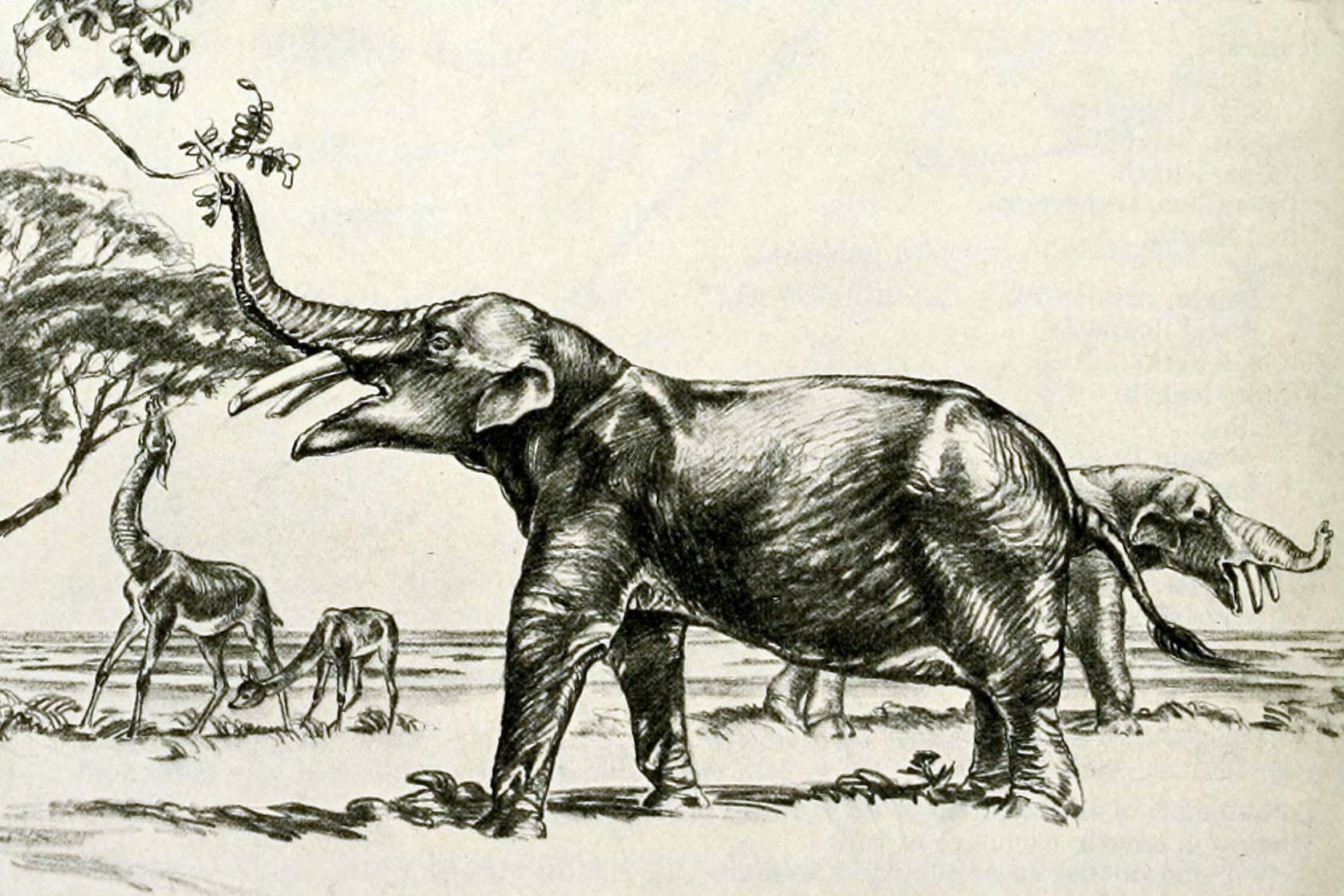
- Life restoration of the Miocene elephant relative Eubelodon
  †Eubelodon
  - †Eubelodon morrilli
- †Eucastor
  - †Eucastor tortus
- †Eucyon
  - †Eucyon davisi
  - †Eucyon skinneri – type locality for species
- †Euhapsis
  - †Euhapsis breugerorum – type locality for species
  - †Euhapsis ellicottae – type locality for species
  - †Euhapsis platyceps – type locality for species
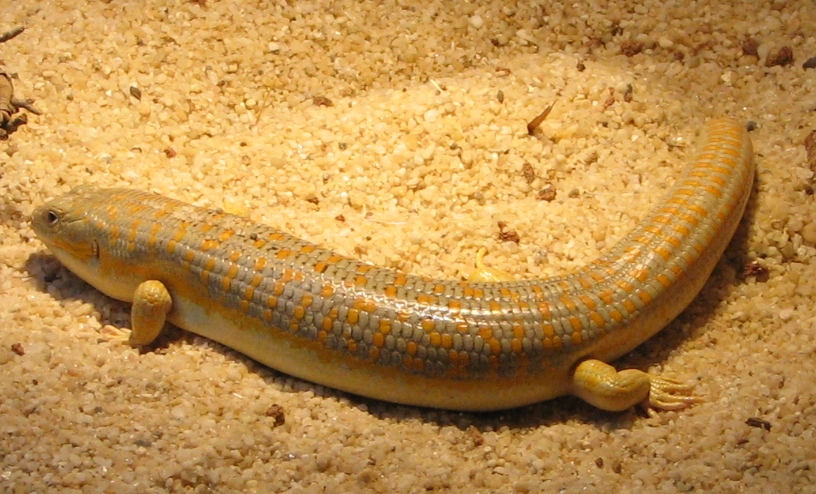
- A living Eumeces skink
  Eumeces
  - †Eumeces antiquus – type locality for species
  - †Eumeces minimus
  - †Eumeces striatulatus – or unidentified comparable form
- †Eumys
  - †Eumys brachyodus
  - †Eumys elegans
  - †Eumys parvidens – type locality for species
- †Euoplocyon
  - †Euoplocyon brachygnathus
- †Euroxenomys
  - †Euroxenomys wilsoni
- †Eutypomys
  - †Eutypomys thomsoni

== F ==
- †Fanimus
  - †Fanimus ultimus – type locality for species
- Felis
  - †Felis rexroadensis – or unidentified comparable form
- †Florentiamys
  - †Florentiamys tiptoni
- †Floridatragulus
- †Fossorcastor
  - †Fossorcastor greeni – type locality for species
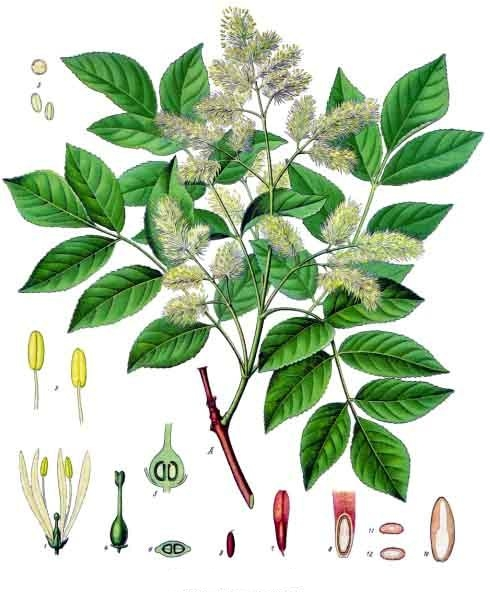
- Illustrations of the flowers and foliage of a living Fraxinus, or ash tree, with insets further detailing its anatomy
  †Fraxinus
  - †Fraxinus coulteri

== G ==
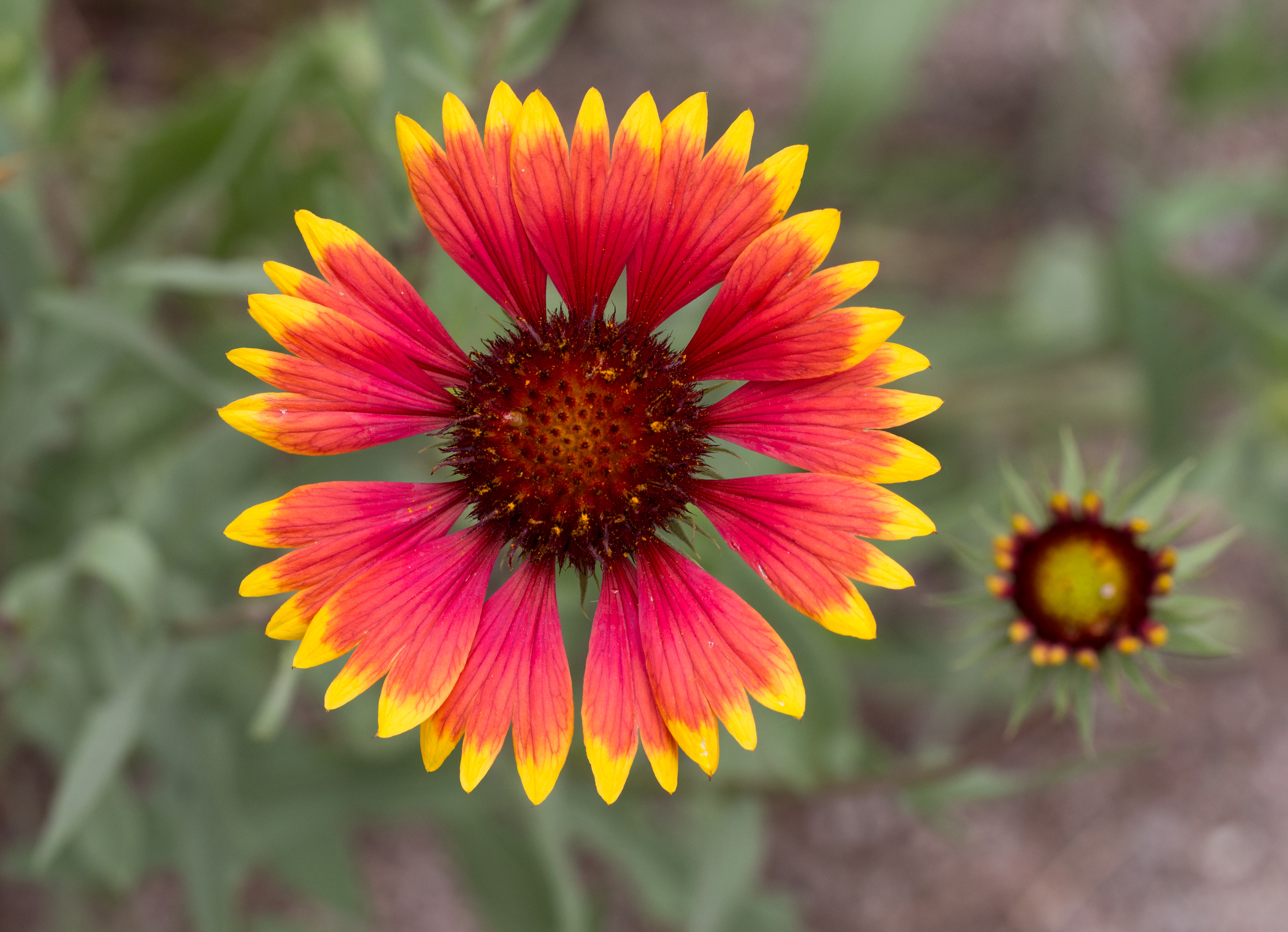
- A living Gaillardia, or blanket flower
  †Gaillardia
  - †Gaillardia thomsoni – type locality for species
- †Galbreathia
  - †Galbreathia bettae
  - †Galbreathia novellus
- †Galushaceras – type locality for genus
  - †Galushaceras levellorum – type locality for species
- Geochelone
  - †Geochelone nordensis – type locality for species
  - †Geochelone oelrichi
- Geomys
  - †Geomys bursarius
  - †Geomys lutescens
  - †Geomys quinni
  - †Geomys tobinensis – or unidentified comparable form
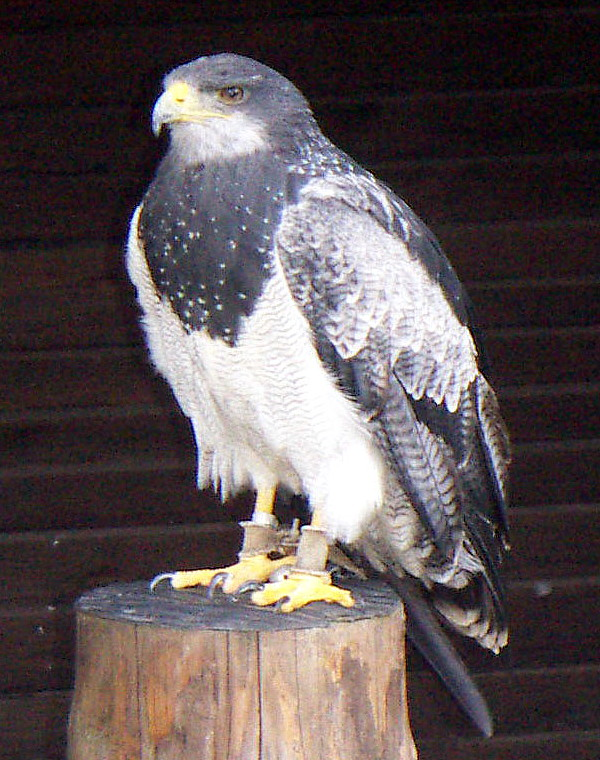
- A living Geranoaetus bird of prey
  Geranoaetus
  - †Geranoaetus contortus
- †Geringia
  - †Geringia mcgregori
- †Geringophis
  - †Geringophis depressus
  - †Geringophis vetus – type locality for species
  - †Geringophis yatkolae – type locality for species
- Gerrhonotus
  - †Gerrhonotus mungerorum – or unidentified comparable form
- †Gigantocamelus
  - †Gigantocamelus spatulus – type locality for species
- Glyptemys
  - †Glyptemys valentinensis – type locality for species
- †Glyptosaurus
- †Goinophis – type locality for genus
  - †Goinophis minusculus – type locality for species
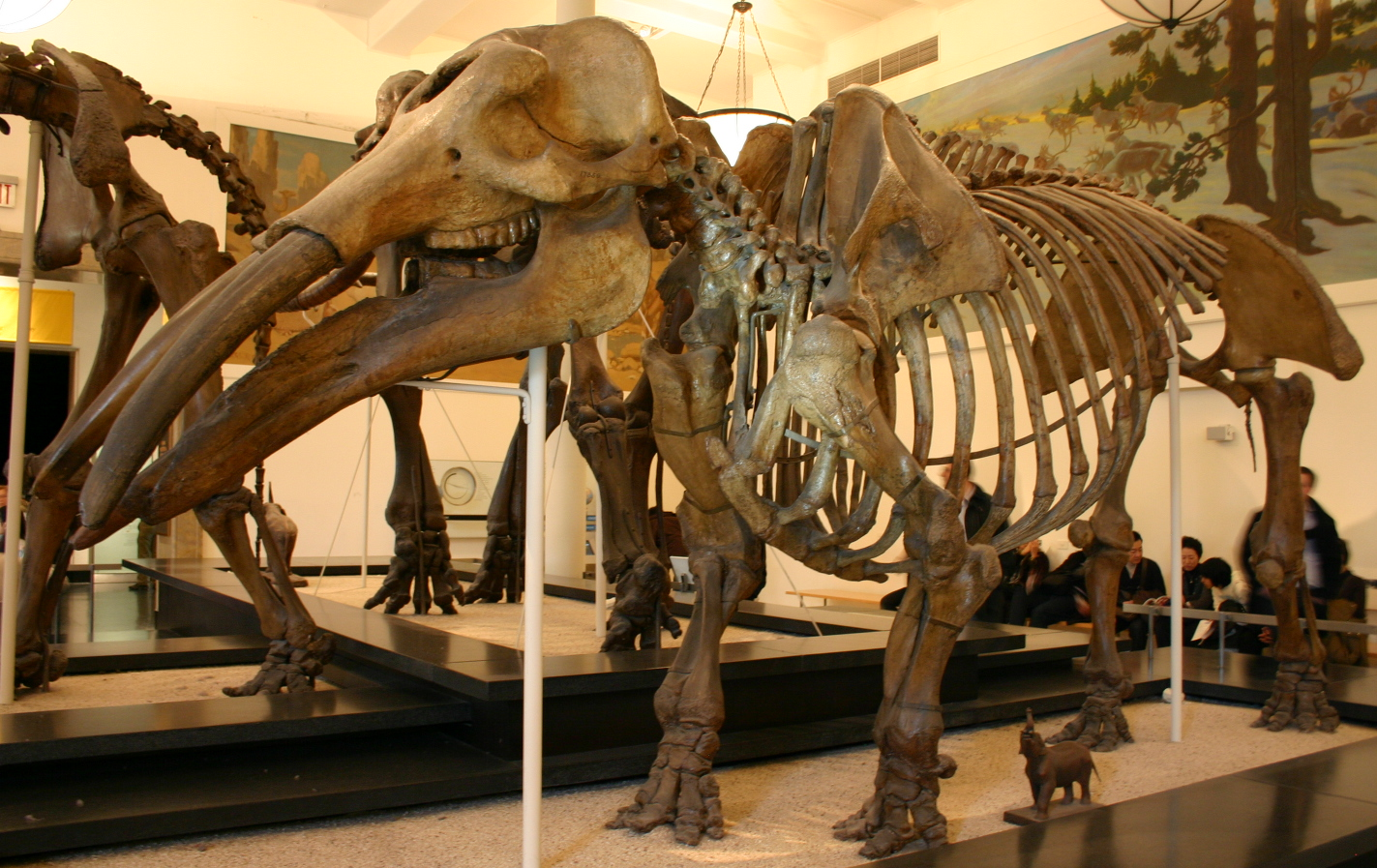
- Mounted fossilized skeleton of the Miocene-Pleistocene elephant relative Gomphotherium
  †Gomphotherium
  - †Gomphotherium productum – type locality for species
- †Goniodontomys
  - †Goniodontomys disjunctus
- Gopherus
  - †Gopherus laticuneus
- Graptemys
- †Gregorymys
  - †Gregorymys formosus
- †Gripholagomys
  - †Gripholagomys lavocati
- Grus
  - †Grus pratensis
- †Guildayomys
  - †Guildayomys hibbardi – type locality for species

== H ==
- †Harrisonsaurus – type locality for genus
  - †Harrisonsaurus fossilis – type locality for species
- †Harrymys
  - †Harrymys magnus
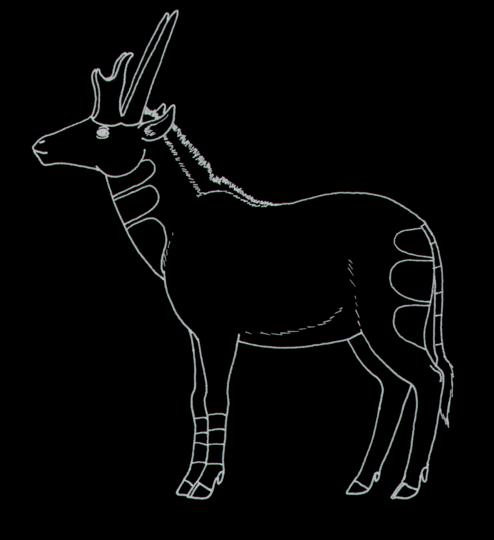
- Life restoration of the Pleistocene pronghorn Hayoceros
  †Hayoceros
  - †Hayoceros barbouri – type locality for species
- †Helagras
  - †Helagras orellanensis – type locality for species
- †Heliscomys
  - †Heliscomys hatcheri
  - †Heliscomys macdonaldi – type locality for species
  - †Heliscomys mcgrewi – type locality for species
  - †Heliscomys vetus
- †Helodermoides
  - †Helodermoides tuberculatus
- †Hemiauchenia
  - †Hemiauchenia macrocephala
- †Heptacodon
  - †Heptacodon occidentale – or unidentified comparable form
- †Herpetotherium
  - †Herpetotherium fugax
  - †Herpetotherium youngi
- †Hesperhys
  - †Hesperhys vagrans
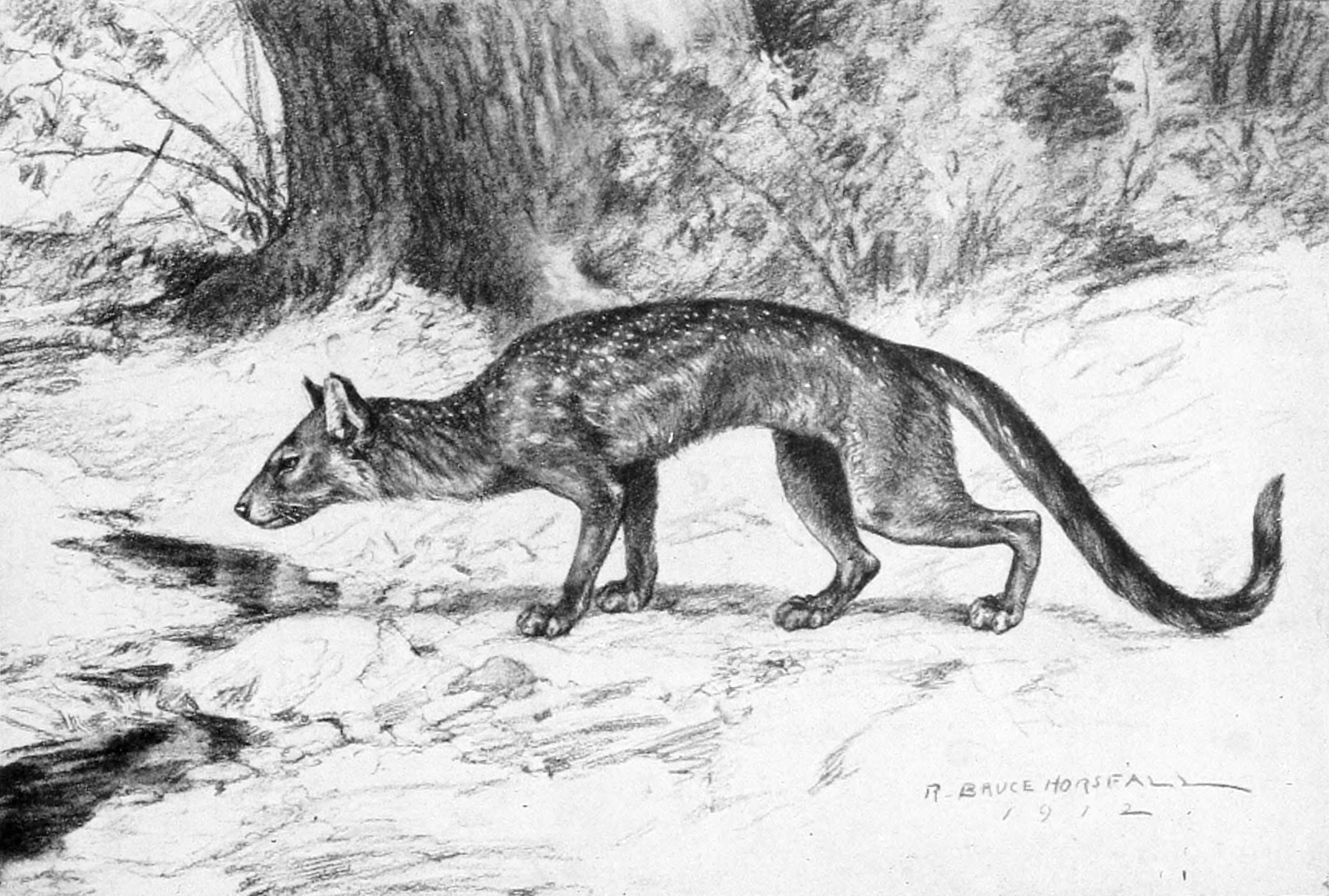
- Life restoration of the Eocene-Oligocene dog Hesperocyon. Robert Bruce Horsfall (1913).
  †Hesperocyon
  - †Hesperocyon gregarius
- †Hesperolagomys
  - †Hesperolagomys fluviatilis
  - †Hesperolagomys galbreathi – or unidentified comparable form
- †Hesperoscalops
  - †Hesperoscalops mcgrewi
- †Hesperotestudo
  - †Hesperotestudo angusticeps – type locality for species
  - †Hesperotestudo orthopygia
- Heterodon
  - †Heterodon nasicus
  - †Heterodon platyrhinos
- †Heteromeryx
  - †Heteromeryx dispar
- †Hibbardomys
  - †Hibbardomys marthae – type locality for species
  - †Hibbardomys skinneri – type locality for species
  - †Hibbardomys voorhiesi – type locality for species
- †Hipparion
  - †Hipparion forcei
  - †Hipparion tehonense
- †Hippotherium
- †Hitonkala
  - †Hitonkala macdonaldtau – type locality for species
- Holbrookia – tentative report
  - †Holbrookia antiqua – type locality for species
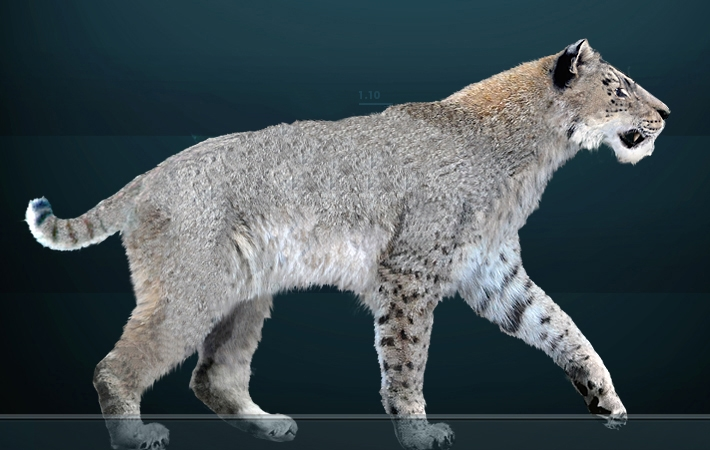
- Restoration of Pliocene-Pleistocene Homotherium, or scimitar cat
  †Homotherium
  - †Homotherium crusafonti
- †Hoplophoneus
  - †Hoplophoneus mentalis
  - †Hoplophoneus primaevus
- †Hyaenodon
  - †Hyaenodon crucians
- Hyla
  - †Hyla gratiosa – or unidentified comparable form
  - †Hyla squirella – or unidentified comparable form
  - †Hyla versicolor – or unidentified comparable form
- †Hypertragulus
  - †Hypertragulus calcaratus
  - †Hypertragulus chadronensis – type locality for species
  - †Hypertragulus crawfordensis – type locality for species
  - †Hypertragulus minor – type locality for species
  - †Hypertragulus quadratus – type locality for species
  - †Hypertragulus sequens – type locality for species
- †Hypisodus
  - †Hypisodus alacer
  - †Hypisodus ironsi – type locality for species
  - †Hypisodus minimus
  - †Hypisodus paululus – type locality for species
  - †Hypisodus retallacki – type locality for species
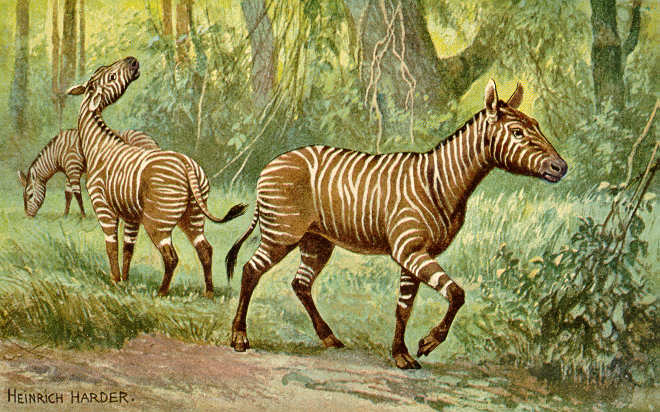
- Life restoration of the Miocene horse Hypohippus. Heinrich Harder (1920).
  †Hypohippus
  - †Hypohippus affinis
  - †Hypohippus osborni
  - †Hypohippus pertinax – or unidentified comparable form
- †Hypolagus
  - †Hypolagus fontinalis
  - †Hypolagus furlongi
  - †Hypolagus parviplicatus
  - †Hypolagus regalis
  - †Hypolagus ringoldensis
  - †Hypolagus vetus
  - †Hypolagus voorhiesi
- †Hypsiops
  - †Hypsiops breviceps
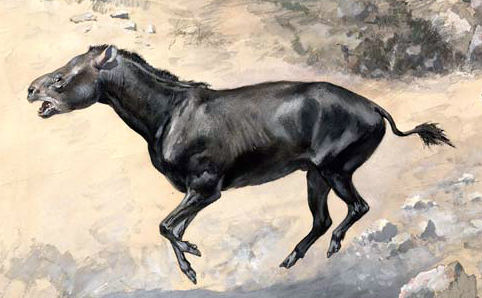
- Life restoration of the Eocene-Oligocene odd-toed ungulate Hyracodon. Charles R. Knight (1896).
  †Hyracodon
  - †Hyracodon leidyanus
  - †Hyracodon nebraskensis
- †Hystricops
  - †Hystricops venustus

== I ==
- Ictalurus
  - †Ictalurus echinatus
  - †Ictalurus lambda
  - †Ictalurus leidyi – or unidentified comparable form
  - †Ictalurus punctatus – or unidentified comparable form
- †Idiogenomys – type locality for genus
  - †Idiogenomys ozziei – type locality for species
- Ilex
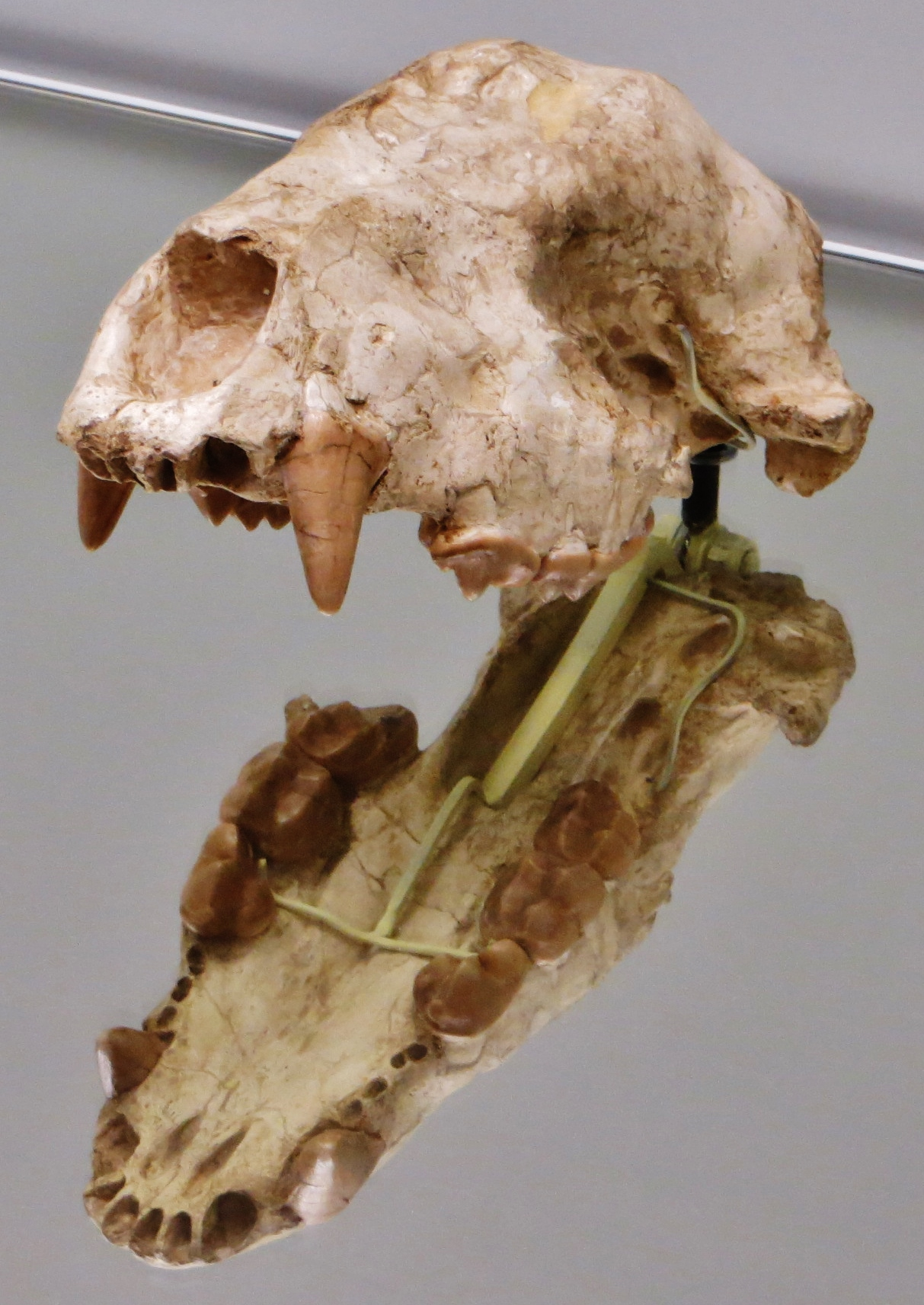
- Fossilized skull of the Miocene bear Indarctos
  †Indarctos
  - †Indarctos oregonensis
- †Ischyrocyon
  - †Ischyrocyon gidleyi
- †Ischyromys
  - †Ischyromys douglassi
  - †Ischyromys typus
  - †Ischyromys veterior

== J ==
- †Jimomys
  - †Jimomys labaughi – type locality for species
- Juglans

== K ==
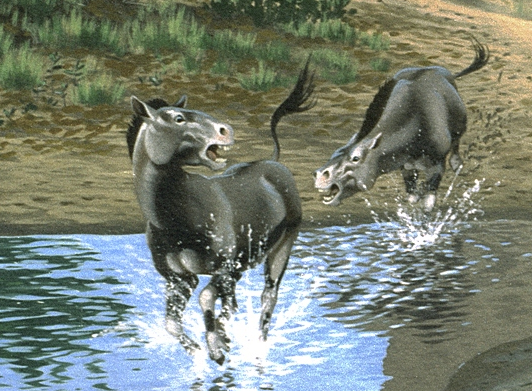
- Restoration of the Oligocene-Miocene horse Kalobatippus
  †Kalobatippus
  - †Kalobatippus agatensis
- †Kansasimys
- Kinosternon
  - †Kinosternon flavescens
- †Kirkomys
  - †Kirkomys nebraskensis

== L ==
- †Lambdoceras
  - †Lambdoceras siouxensis
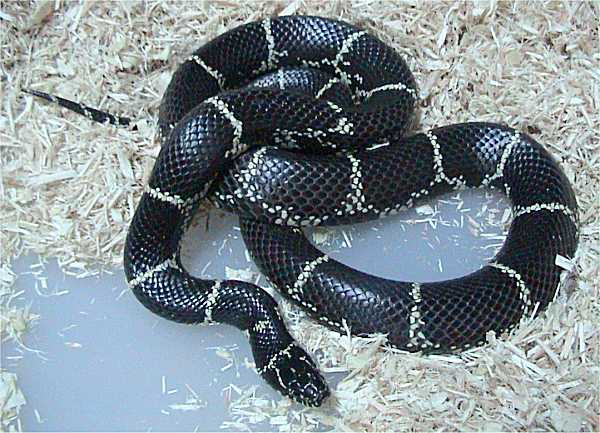
- A living Lampropeltis getula, or eastern kingsnake
  Lampropeltis
  - †Lampropeltis calligaster
  - †Lampropeltis getulus
  - †Lampropeltis similis – type locality for species
  - †Lampropeltis triangulum
- †Lantanotherium
  - †Lantanotherium observatum – type locality for species
- Lasiurus
- †Leidymys
  - †Leidymys blacki
  - †Leidymys cerasus – type locality for species
- Leiocephalus
  - †Leiocephalus nebraskensis
  - †Leiocephalus septentrionalis – type locality for species
- †Lemoynea
  - †Lemoynea biradicularis – type locality for species
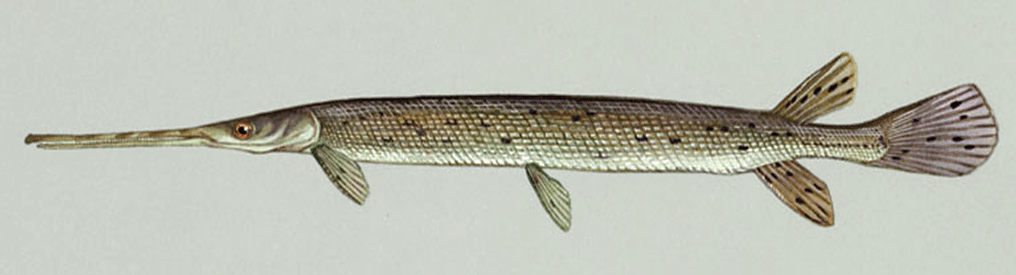
- Illustration of a living Lepisosteus, or gar
  Lepisosteus
- †Lepoides
  - †Lepoides lepoides – type locality for species
- Lepomis
  - †Lepomis microlophus
- †Leptarctus
  - †Leptarctus martini – type locality for species
  - †Leptarctus oregonensis
  - †Leptarctus primus
  - †Leptarctus wortmani – type locality for species
- †Leptauchenia
  - †Leptauchenia decora
  - †Leptauchenia major
- †Leptochoerus
  - †Leptochoerus elegans
  - †Leptochoerus emilyae
  - †Leptochoerus spectabilis
  - †Leptochoerus supremus
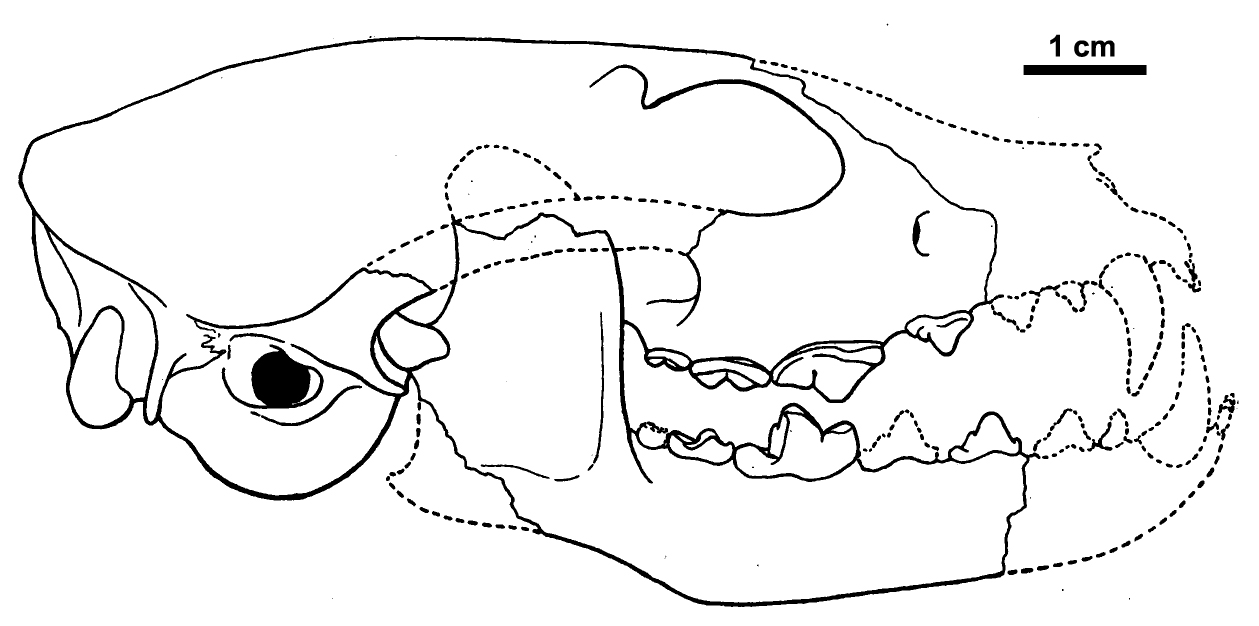
- Illustration of a fossilized skull of the Oligocene-Miocene dog Leptocyon
  †Leptocyon
  - †Leptocyon gregorii – or unidentified comparable form
  - †Leptocyon leidyi – type locality for species
  - †Leptocyon matthewi – type locality for species
  - †Leptocyon vafer
  - †Leptocyon vulpinus
- †Leptodontomys
  - †Leptodontomys douglassi
  - †Leptodontomys stirtoni – or unidentified comparable form
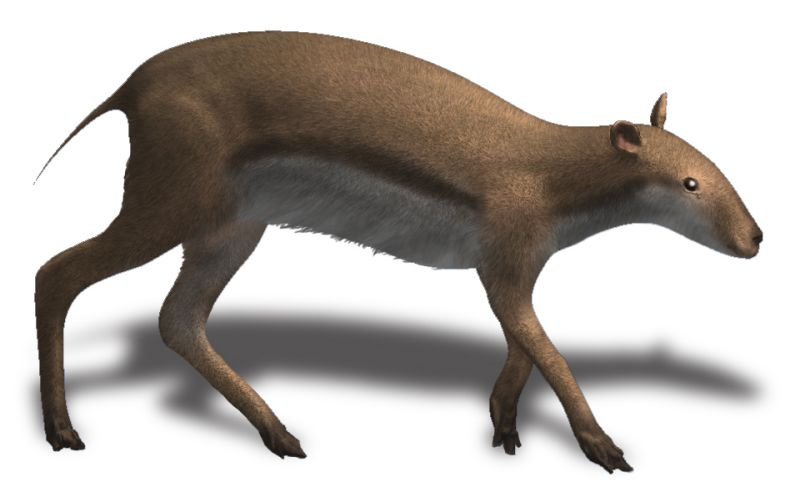
- Life restoration of the Eocene-Oligocene even-toed ungulate Leptomeryx
  †Leptomeryx
  - †Leptomeryx elissae – type locality for species
  - †Leptomeryx esulcatus
  - †Leptomeryx evansi
  - †Leptomeryx speciosus
- †Leptotomus
- Lepus
  - †Lepus californicus – or unidentified comparable form
- Lichanura
- †Lignimus
  - †Lignimus montis
- †Limnoecus
  - †Limnoecus compressus
  - †Limnoecus niobrarensis – type locality for species
- Liquidambar
- †Longirostromeryx
  - †Longirostromeryx wellsi
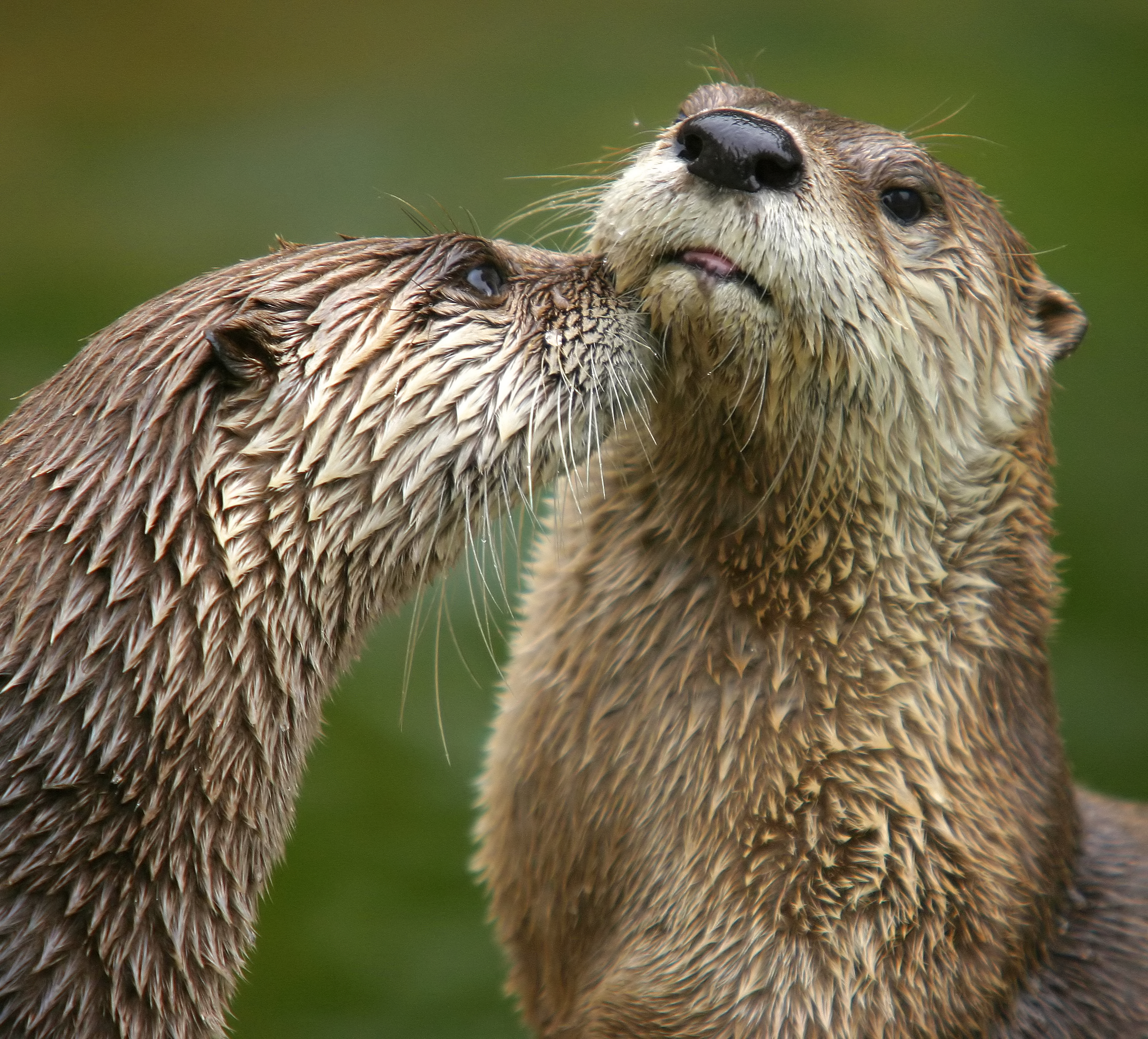
- Portrait living Lontra otters
  Lontra
- †Loupomys
- †Lowesaurus
  - †Lowesaurus matthewi
- Lycopodium

== M ==
- †Machaeromeryx
  - †Machaeromeryx tragulus – type locality for species
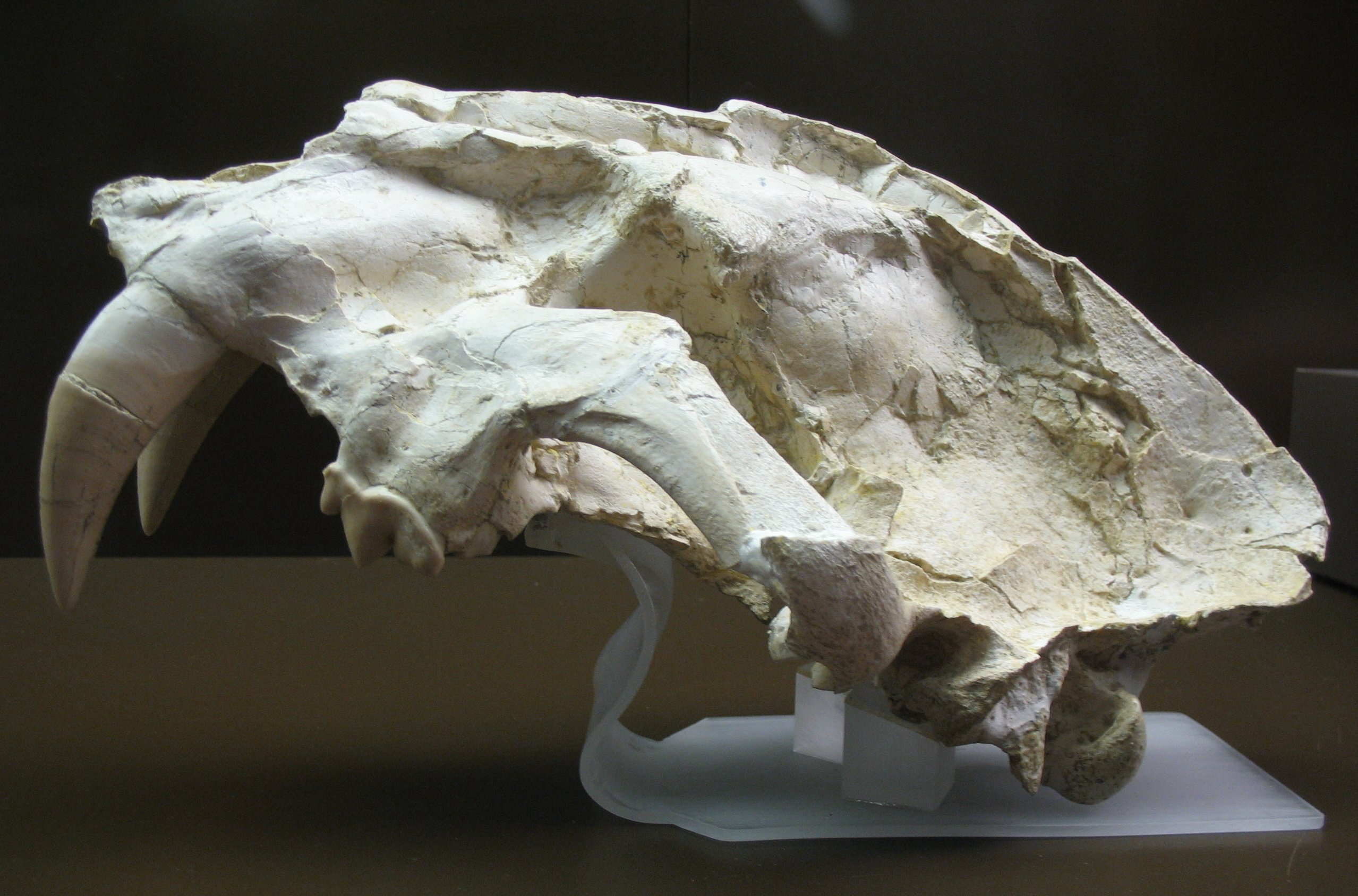
- Fossilized cranium of the Miocene-Pleistocene saber-toothed cat Machairodus
  †Machairodus
- Macrochelys
  - †Macrochelys schmidti
  - †Macrochelys temminckii
- †Macrogenis
  - †Macrogenis crassigenis
- †Macrognathomys
- Mahonia
  - †Mahonia marginata
- †Mammacyon
- †Mammut
  - †Mammut matthewi
- †Mammuthus
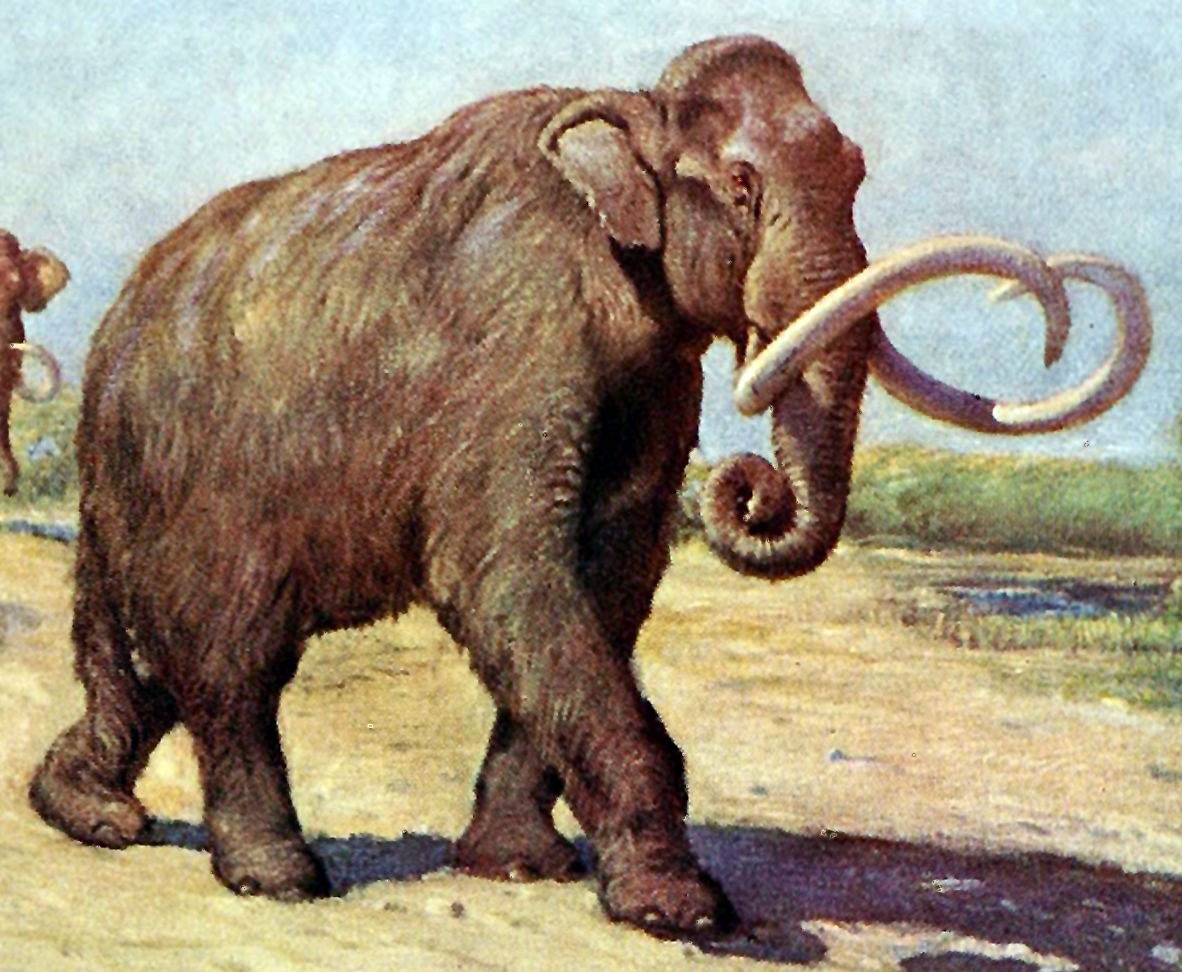
  - Life restoration of a herd of Mammuthus columbi, or Columbian mammoths. The extent of the fur depicted is hypothetical. Charles R. Knight (1909).
    †Mammuthus columbi
- Martes
  - †Martes parviloba
- †Martinogale
  - †Martinogale alveodens
- Masticophis
  - †Masticophis flagellum
- †Matthewlabis
  - †Matthewlabis cedrensis
- †Mediochoerus
  - †Mediochoerus blicki – type locality for species
  - †Mediochoerus johnsoni – type locality for species
- †Megacamelus
  - †Megacamelus merriami – or unidentified comparable form
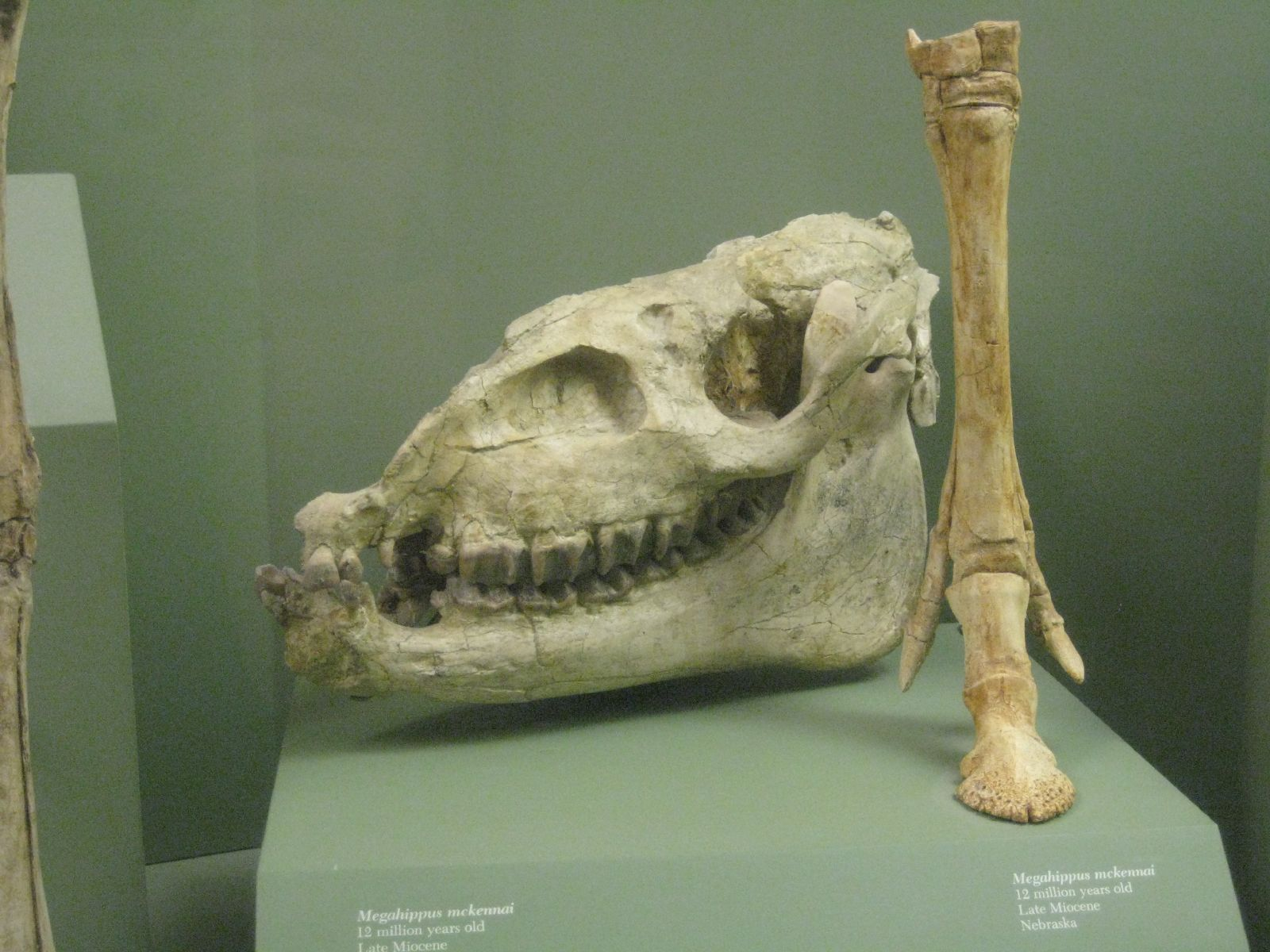
- Fossilized skull and limb bones of the Miocene horse Megahippus
  †Megahippus
  - †Megahippus matthewi
  - †Megahippus mckennai
- †Megalagus
  - †Megalagus brachyodon
  - †Megalagus primitivus
  - †Megalagus turgidus
- †Megalictis
  - †Megalictis ferox
- †Megalonyx
  - †Megalonyx curvidens
  - †Megalonyx leptostomus
- †Megantereon – tentative report
  - †Megantereon hesperus
- †Megasminthus
  - †Megasminthus gladiofex
  - †Megasminthus tiheni
- †Megatylopus
  - †Megatylopus cochrani
  - †Megatylopus gigas
  - †Megatylopus primaevus – or unidentified comparable form
- †Meliakrouniomys
- †Meliosma
  - †Meliosma predentata – type locality for species
- †Meniscomys
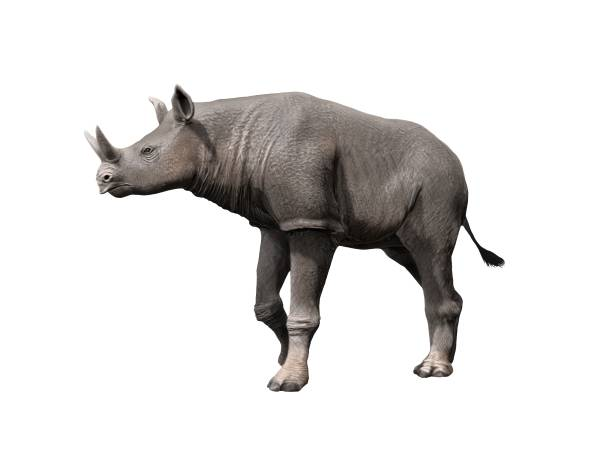
- Life restoration of the Miocene rhinoceros Menoceras
  †Menoceras
  - †Menoceras arikarense – type locality for species
  - †Menoceras barbouri
- Mephitis
  - †Mephitis mephitis
- †Merychippus
  - †Merychippus calamarius – or unidentified comparable form
  - †Merychippus coloradense
  - †Merychippus insignis
  - †Merychippus primus
  - †Merychippus quintus
  - †Merychippus republicanus
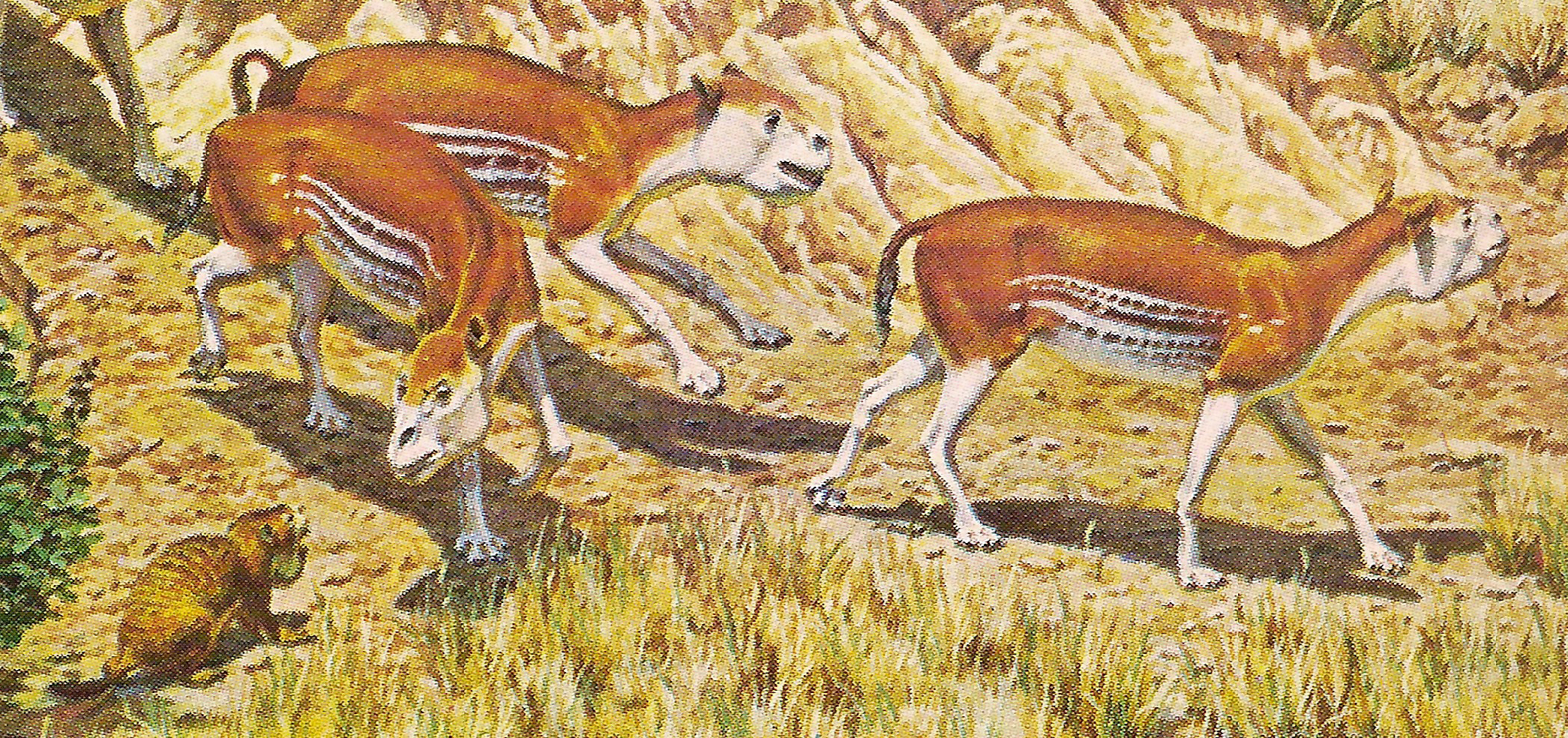
- Life restoration of a herd of the Eocene-Miocene oreodont mammal Merychyus
  †Merychyus
  - †Merychyus arenarum
  - †Merychyus crabilli – type locality for species
  - †Merychyus elegans
  - †Merychyus minimus – type locality for species
  - †Merychyus novomexicanus
  - †Merychyus relictus
  - †Merychyus siouxensis – or unidentified comparable form
- †Merycochoerus
  - †Merycochoerus magnus – type locality for species
  - †Merycochoerus matthewi
  - †Merycochoerus proprius
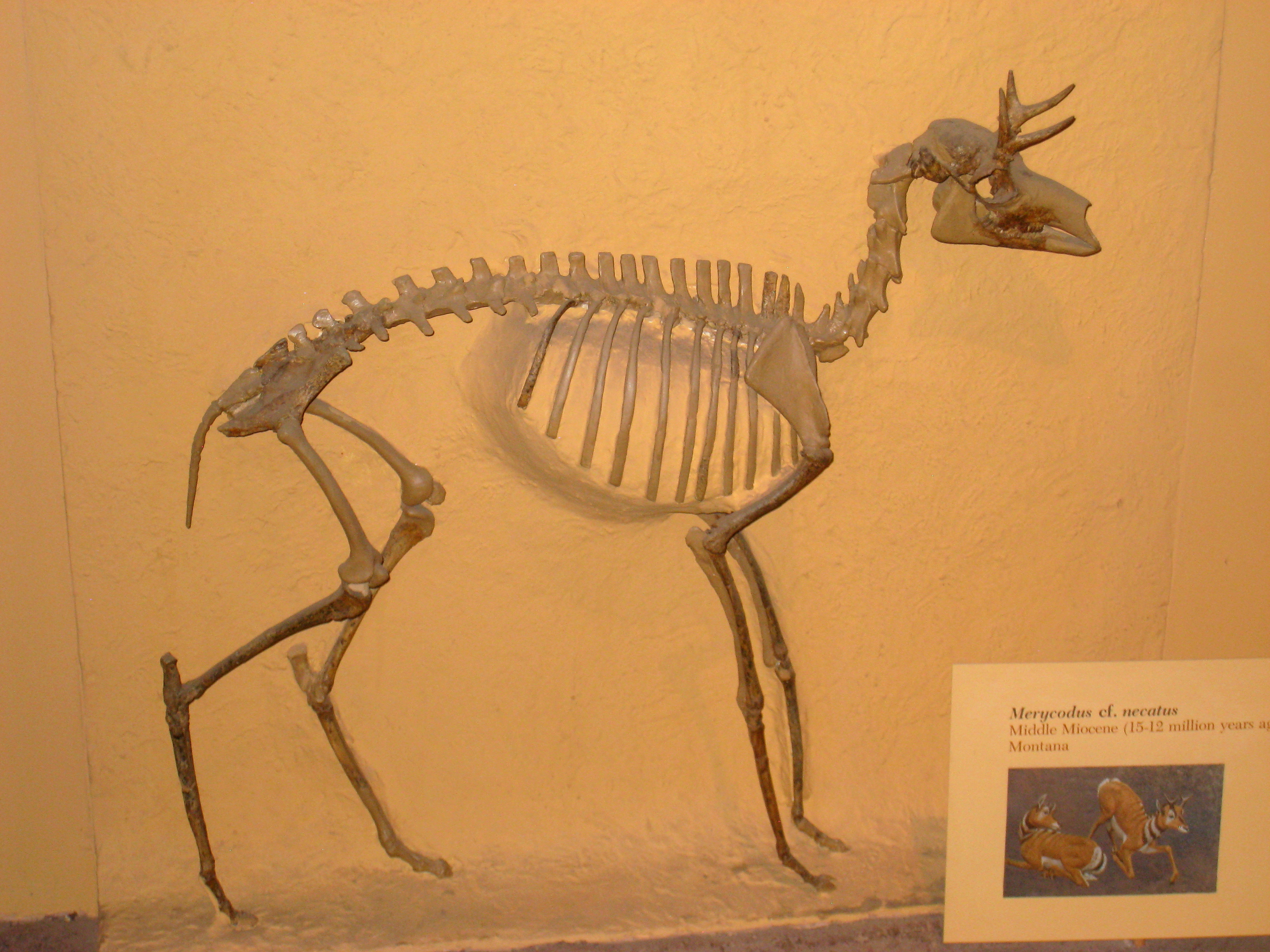
- Mounted fossilized skeleton of the Miocene pronghorn Merycodus
  †Merycodus
  - †Merycodus necatus
  - †Merycodus prodromus – type locality for species
  - †Merycodus sabulonis
  - †Merycodus warreni
- †Merycoides
  - †Merycoides longiceps
- †Merycoidodon
  - †Merycoidodon bullatus
  - †Merycoidodon culbertsoni – type locality for species
  - †Merycoidodon major
- †Mesocyon – report made of unidentified related form or using admittedly obsolete nomenclature
  - †Mesocyon temnodon
- †Mesogaulus
  - †Mesogaulus paniensis
- †Mesohippus
  - †Mesohippus bairdi
- †Mesoreodon
  - †Mesoreodon chelonyx
  - †Mesoreodon minor
- †Mesoscalops
  - †Mesoscalops scopelotemos
- †Metadjidaumo
  - †Metadjidaumo hendryi – or unidentified comparable form
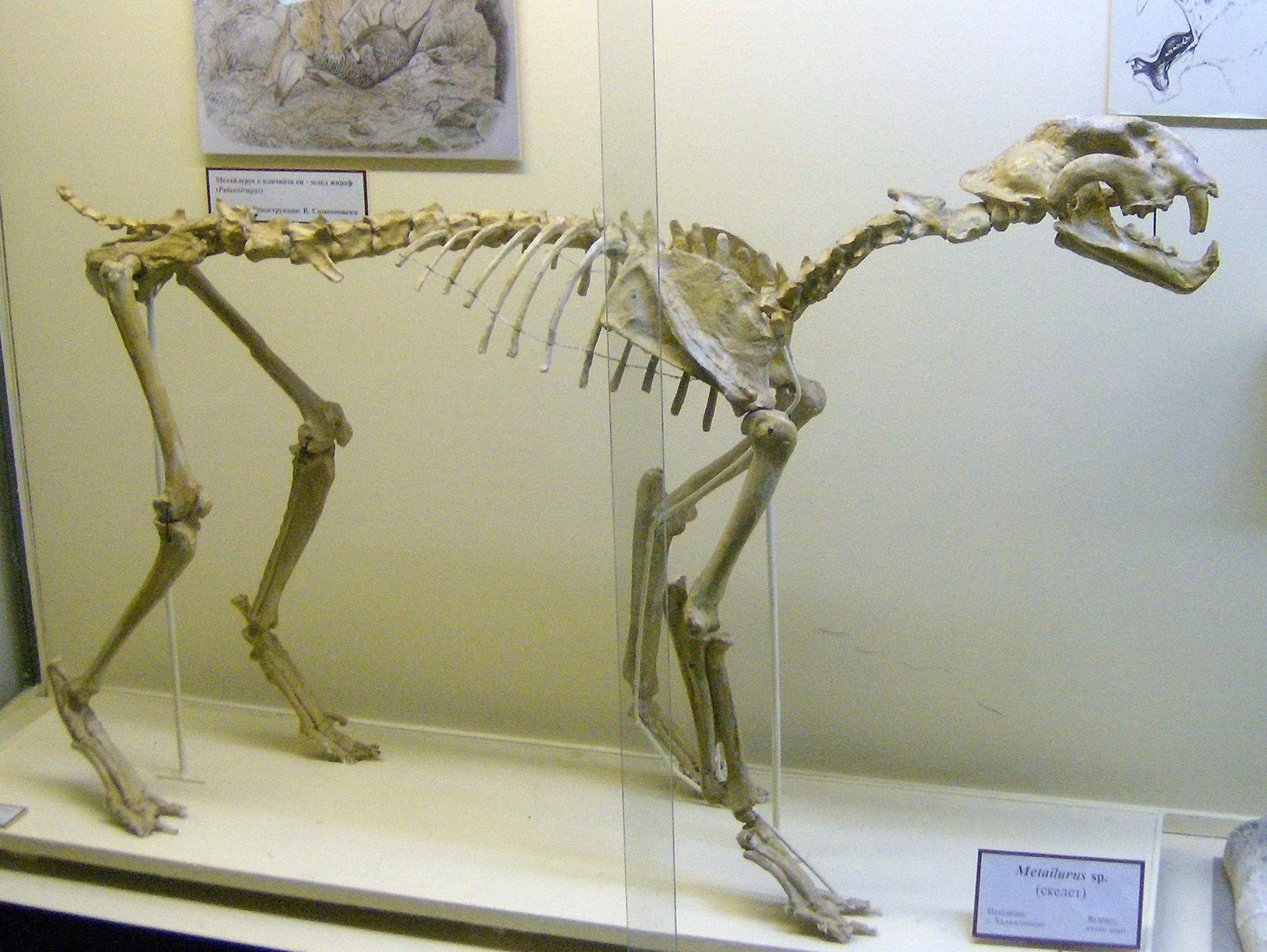
- Mounted fossilized skeleton of the Miocene-Pleistocene saber-toothed cat Metailurus
  †Metailurus
- †Metalopex
  - †Metalopex merriami
- †Metatomarctus
  - †Metatomarctus canavus
- †Metechinus
  - †Metechinus amplior
- †Michenia
  - †Michenia agatensis – type locality for species
- †Micronatrix – type locality for genus
  - †Micronatrix juliescottae – type locality for species
- †Micropternodus
  - †Micropternodus borealis
  - †Micropternodus montrosensis – type locality for species
- Micropterus
- †Microtomarctus
  - †Microtomarctus conferta
- Microtus
  - †Microtus ochrogaster
  - †Microtus pennsylvanicus
- Micrurus
- Mictomys
  - †Mictomys kansasensis
  - †Mictomys meltoni
  - †Mictomys vetus – or unidentified comparable form
- †Migmacastor – type locality for genus
  - †Migmacastor procumbodens – type locality for species
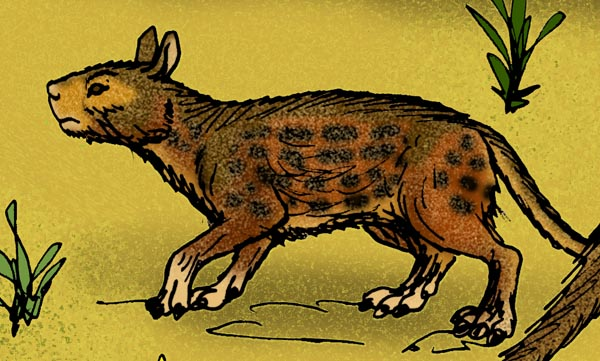
- Life restoration of the Eocene-Oligocene oreodont mammal Miniochoerus
  †Miniochoerus
  - †Miniochoerus affinis
  - †Miniochoerus chadronensis
  - †Miniochoerus forsythae
  - †Miniochoerus gracilis
  - †Miniochoerus helprini – type locality for species
  - †Miniochoerus starkensis – type locality for species
- †Mioheteromys
  - †Mioheteromys amplissimus – type locality for species
  - †Mioheteromys subterior – type locality for species
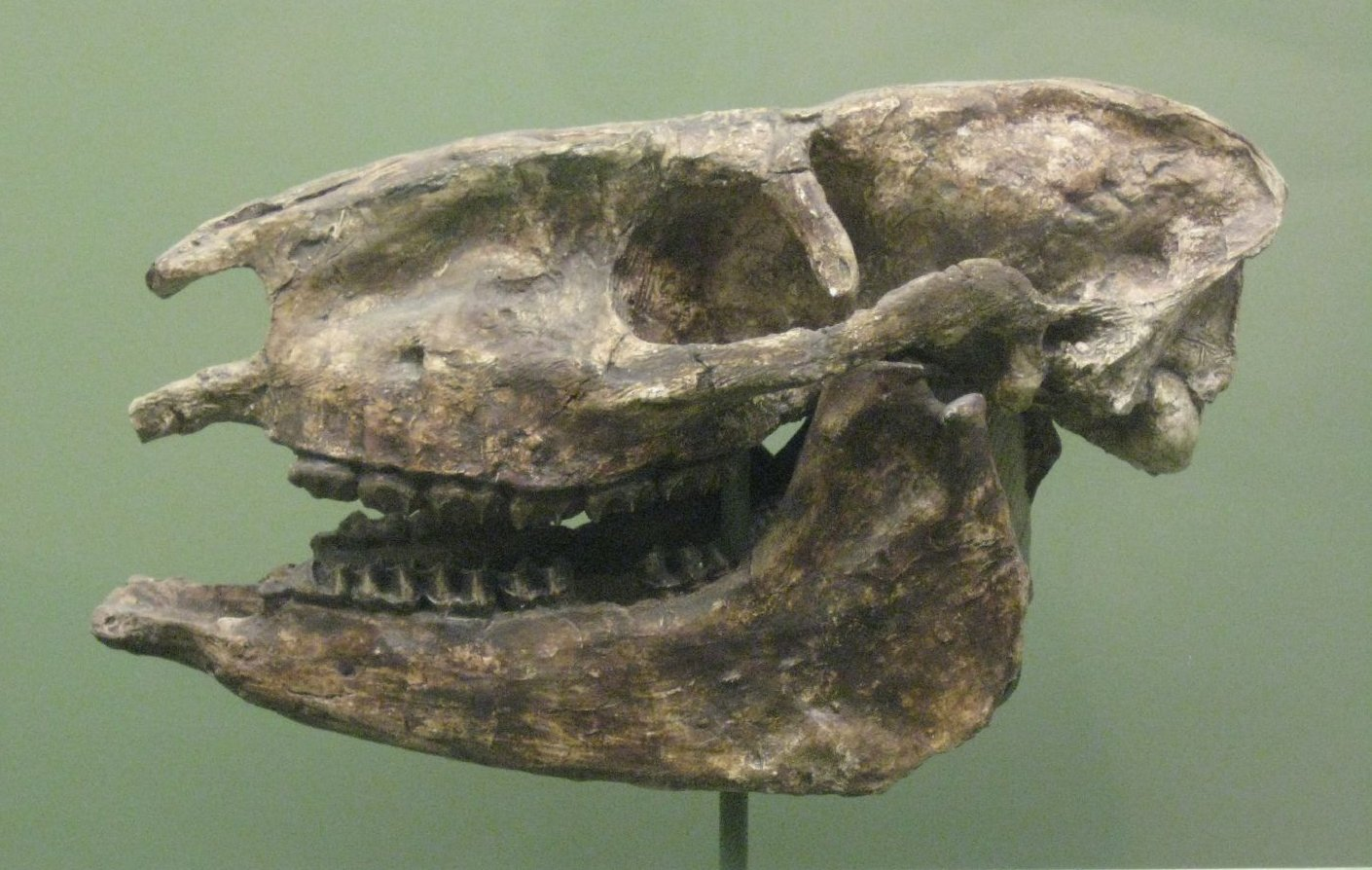
- Fossilized skull of the Eocene-Oligocene three-toed horse Miohippus
  †Miohippus
  - †Miohippus intermedius – or unidentified comparable form
- †Miolabis
  - †Miolabis princetonianus – type locality for species
- †Miomustela
  - †Miomustela madisonae
- †Mionictis
  - †Mionictis elegans – type locality for species
  - †Mionictis incertus – type locality for species
  - †Mionictis letifer – type locality for species
  - †Mionictis pristinus
- †Miosicista
  - †Miosicista angulus – type locality for species
- †Miospermophilus
  - †Miospermophilus bryanti
  - †Miospermophilus wyomingensis
- †Miotapirus
  - †Miotapirus harrisonensis
- †Miotylopus
  - †Miotylopus gibbi
  - †Miotylopus leonardi
- †Monosaulax
  - †Monosaulax curtus
  - †Monosaulax pansus
  - †Monosaulax skinneri – type locality for species
  - †Monosaulax tedi – type locality for species
- †Mookomys
  - †Mookomys altifluminis
  - †Mookomys altifluminus
- †Moropus
  - †Moropus elatus
  - †Moropus hollandi – type locality for species
  - †Moropus merriami
- Mustela
  - †Mustela frenata
  - †Mustela nigripes
  - †Mustela rexroadensis – or unidentified comparable form
  - †Mustela vison
- Mycteria
  - †Mycteria milleri
- †Mylagaulus
  - †Mylagaulus cambridgensis
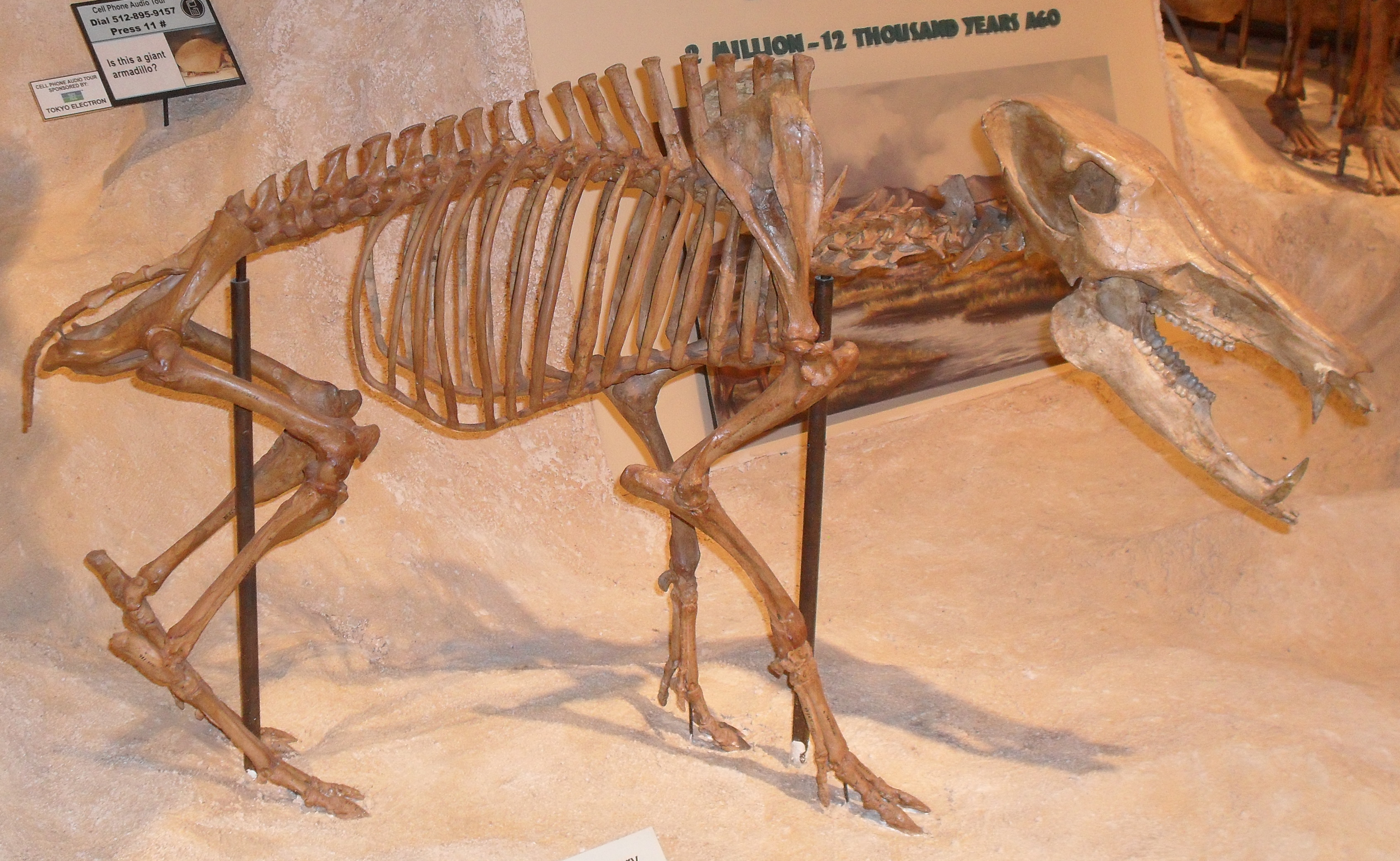
- Fossilized skeleton of the Pliocene-Holocene peccary Mylohyus
  †Mylohyus
- Myotis
- †Mystipterus
  - †Mystipterus martini

== N ==
- †Namatomys
  - †Namatomys lloydi
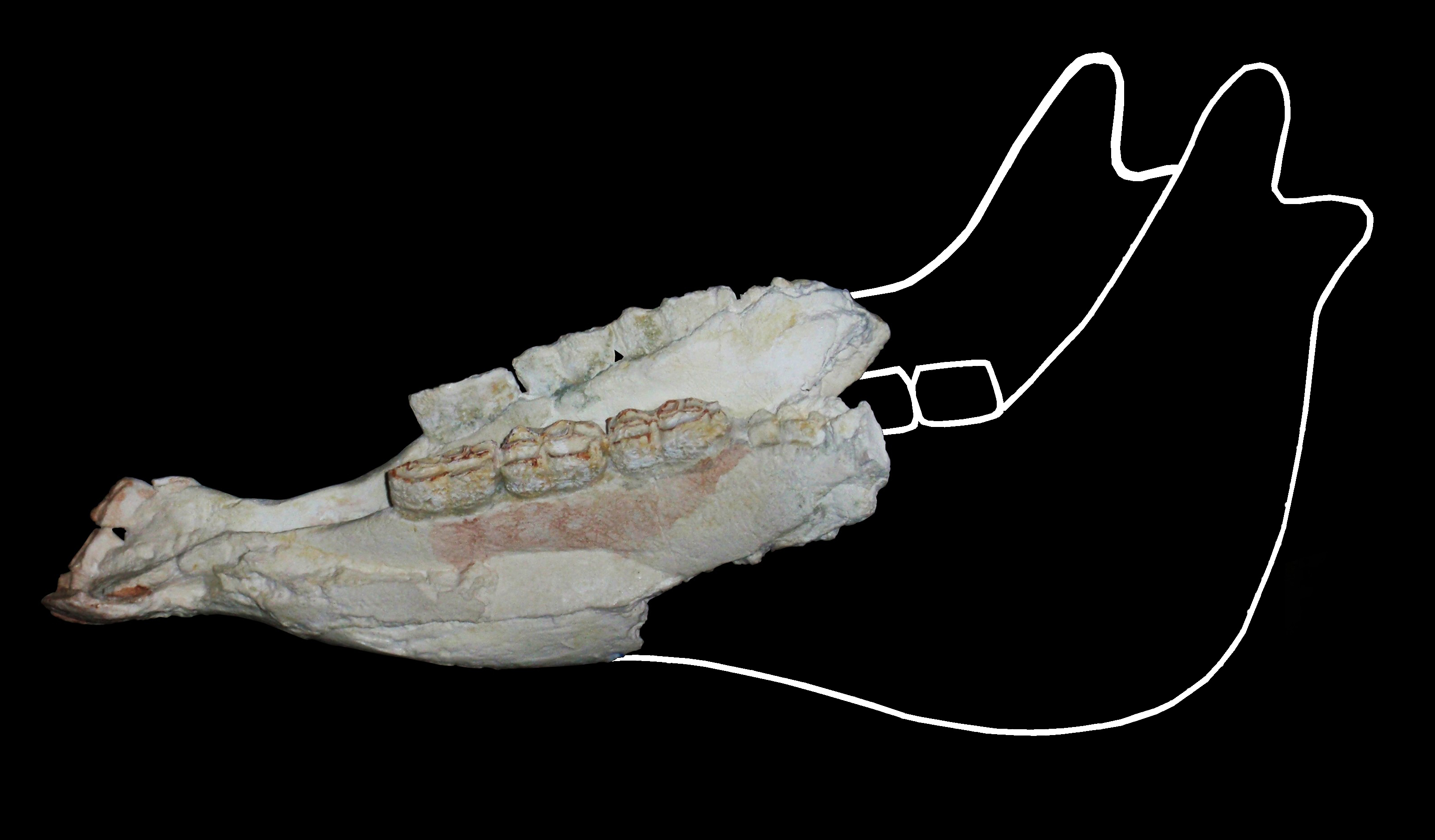
- Partial fossilized mandible of the Miocene-Pliocene horse Nannippus
  †Nannippus
  - †Nannippus lenticularis
- †Nanodelphys
  - †Nanodelphys hunti
- †Nanotragulus
  - †Nanotragulus loomisi
  - †Nanotragulus ordinatus
- Natrix – or unidentified comparable form
- †Nebraskomys
  - †Nebraskomys mcgrewi – type locality for species
- †Nebraskophis – type locality for genus
  - †Nebraskophis skinneri – type locality for species
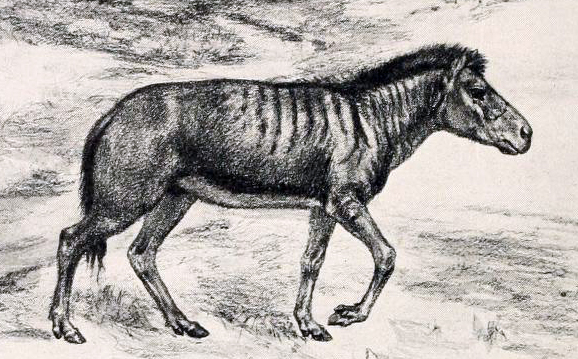
- Life restoration of a herd of Neohipparion. Robert Bruce Horsfall (1913).
  †Neohipparion
  - †Neohipparion affine
  - †Neohipparion eurystyle – or unidentified comparable form
  - †Neohipparion leptode
  - †Neohipparion trampasense
- †Neonatrix – type locality for genus
  - †Neonatrix elongata – type locality for species
  - †Neonatrix infera – or unidentified comparable form
  - †Neonatrix magna – type locality for species
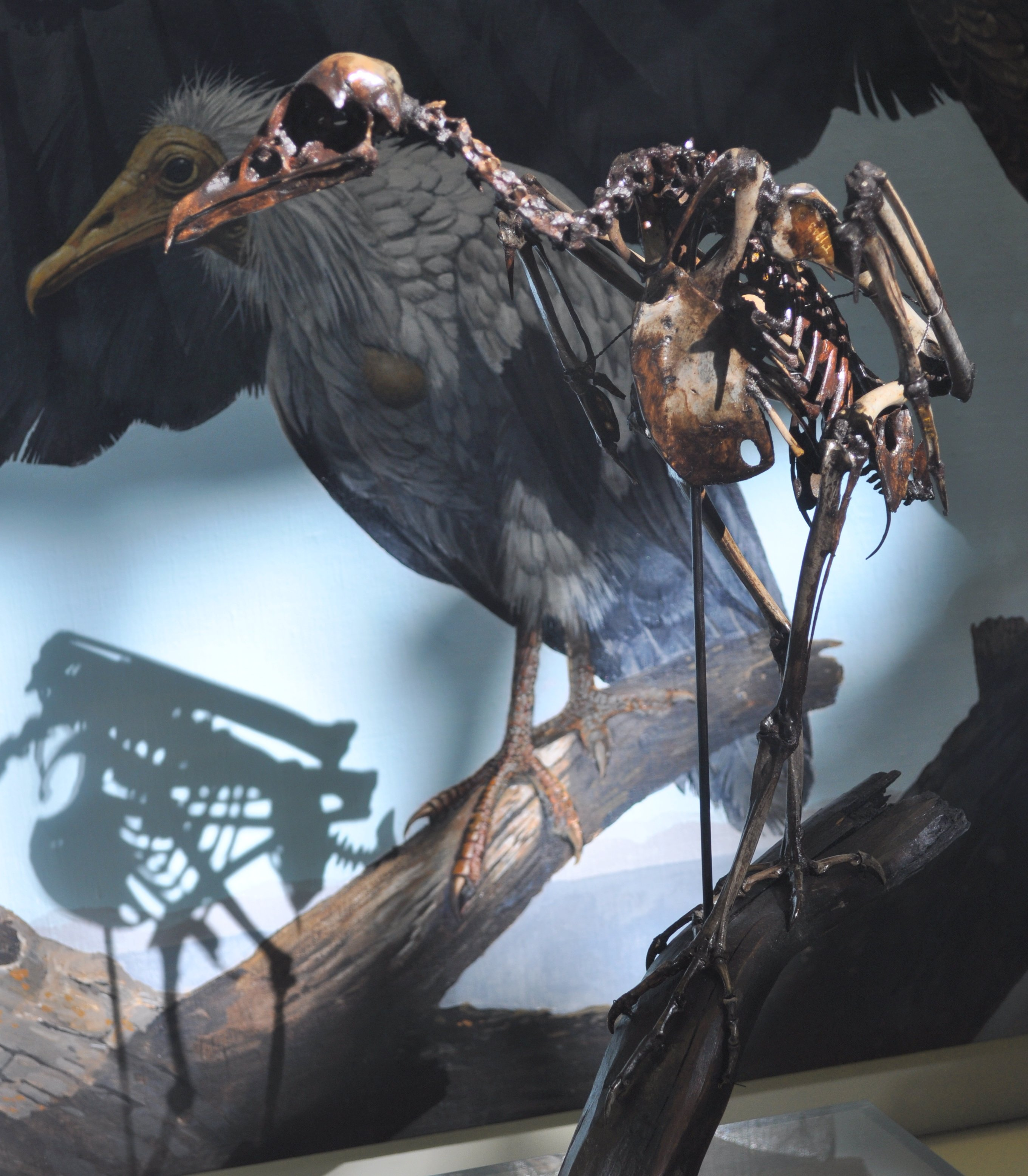
- Mounted fossilized skeleton of the Miocene Neophrontops
  Neophrontops
  - †Neophrontops vetustus – type locality for species
- Neotamias
- Neotoma
  - †Neotoma quadriplicata – or unidentified comparable form
  - †Neotoma sawrockensis – or unidentified comparable form
- †Neotragocerus
  - †Neotragocerus improvisus – type locality for species
- Nerodia
  - †Nerodia hillmani
  - †Nerodia rhombifera
  - †Nerodia sipedon
- †Nexuotapirus
  - †Nexuotapirus marslandensis – type locality for species
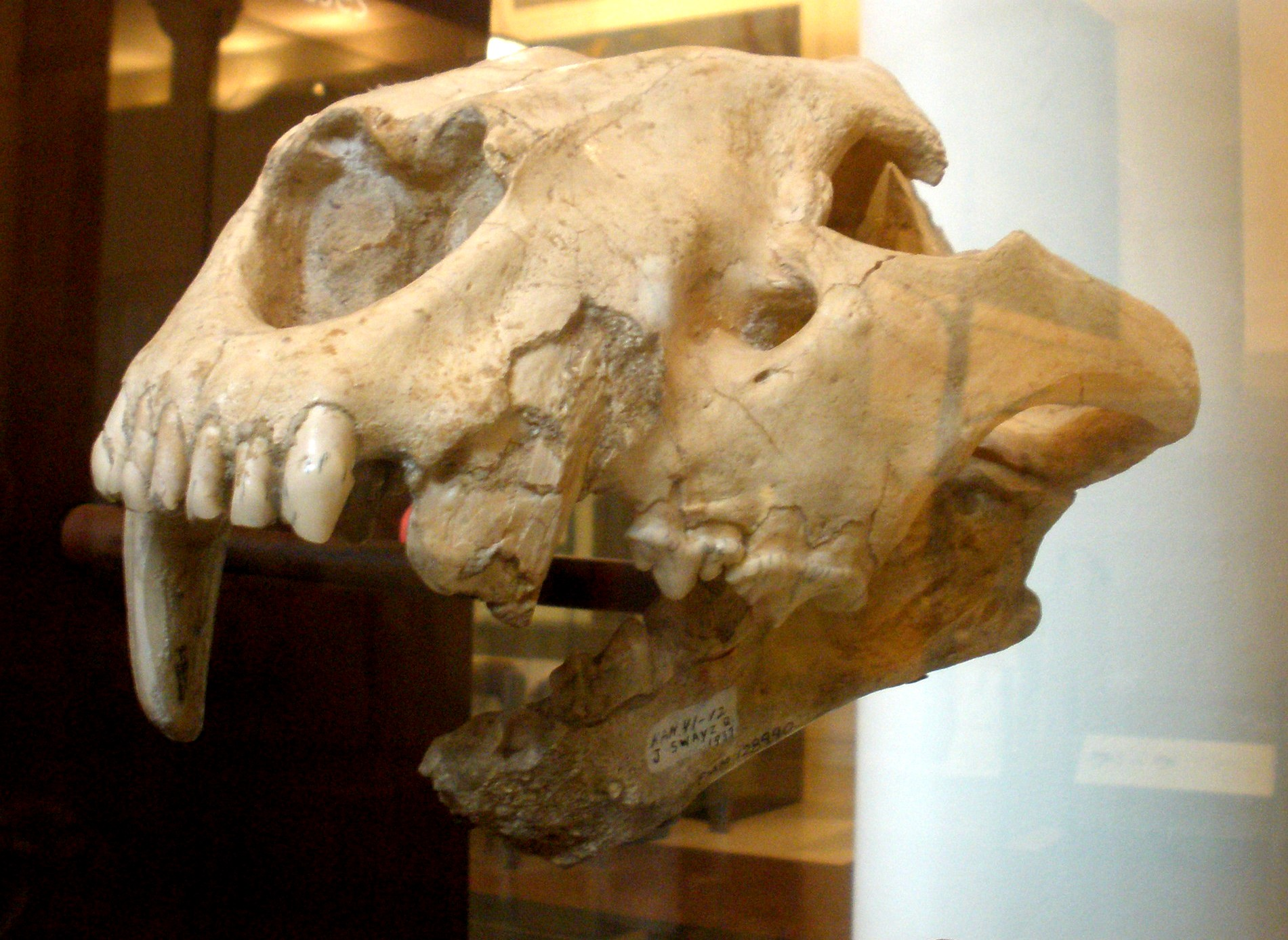
- Fossilized partial cranium of the Miocene saber-toothed cat Nimravides
  †Nimravides
  - †Nimravides galiani
  - †Nimravides pedionomus – type locality for species
  - †Nimravides thinobates
- †Nordenosaurus
  - †Nordenosaurus magnus – type locality for species
- †Nothodipoides
  - †Nothodipoides planus
  - †Nothodipoides stirtoni – type locality for species
- †Nothotylopus
- †Nototamias
  - †Nototamias quadratus – type locality for species
- †Nyssa
  - †Nyssa copeana

== O ==
- †Ocajila
  - †Ocajila makpiyahe
- Ochotona
  - †Ochotona spanglei – or unidentified comparable form
- Odocoileus
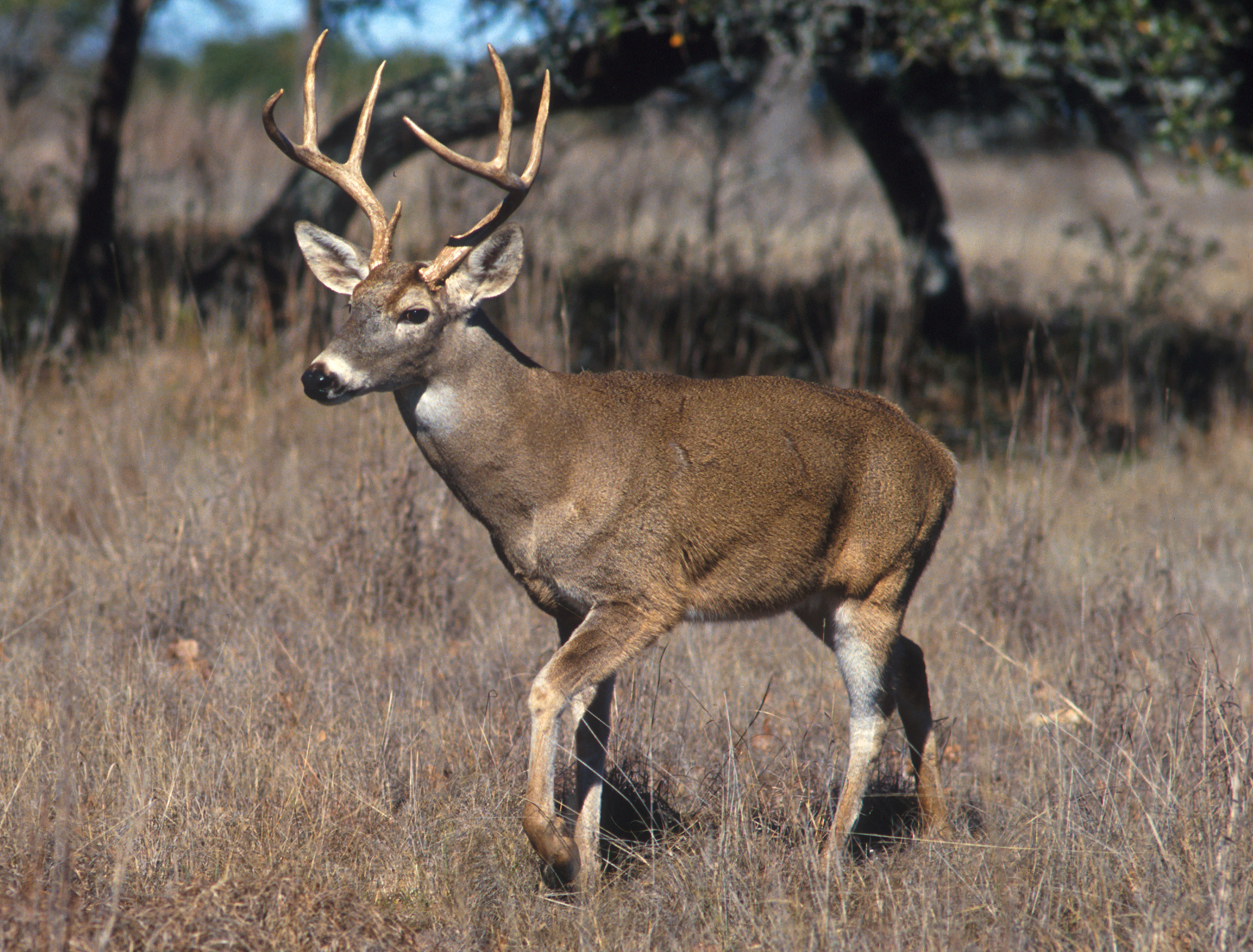
  - A living Odocoileus virginianus, or white-tailed deer
    †Odocoileus virginianus
- Ogmodontomys
  - †Ogmodontomys poaphagus
- †Ogmophis
  - †Ogmophis compactus
  - †Ogmophis miocompactus
- †Oligobunis
- †Oligomyotis
- †Oligoryctes
  - †Oligoryctes cameronensis
- †Oligoscalops
  - †Oligoscalops galbreathi
- †Oligospermophilus
  - †Oligospermophilus douglassi
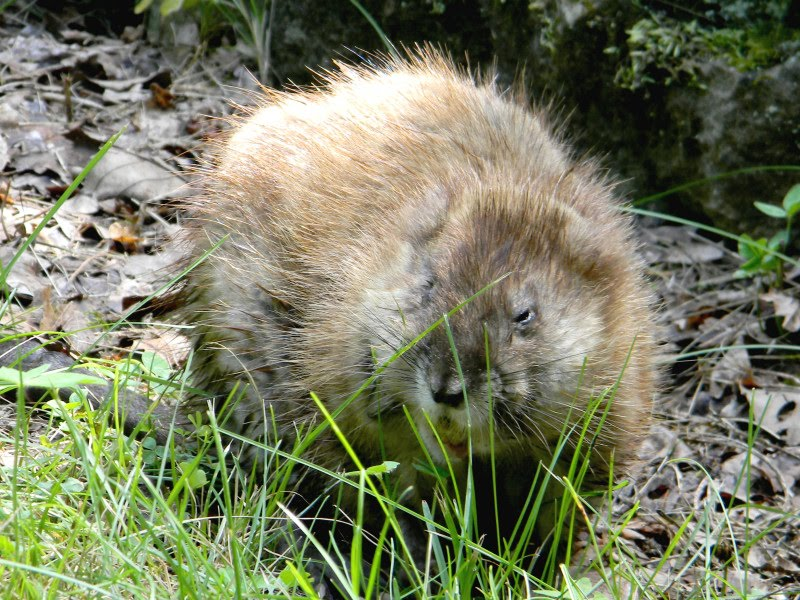
- A living Ondatra, or muskrat
  Ondatra
  - †Ondatra annectens – or unidentified comparable form
  - †Ondatra idahoensis
  - †Ondatra meadensis
  - †Ondatra zibethicus
- Onychomys
  - †Onychomys larabeei – or unidentified comparable form
  - †Onychomys leucogaster – or unidentified comparable form
  - †Onychomys pedroensis – or unidentified comparable form
- Opheodrys – or unidentified comparable form
- †Ophiomys
  - †Ophiomys fricki
  - †Ophiomys magilli
  - †Ophiomys parvus
- Ophisaurus
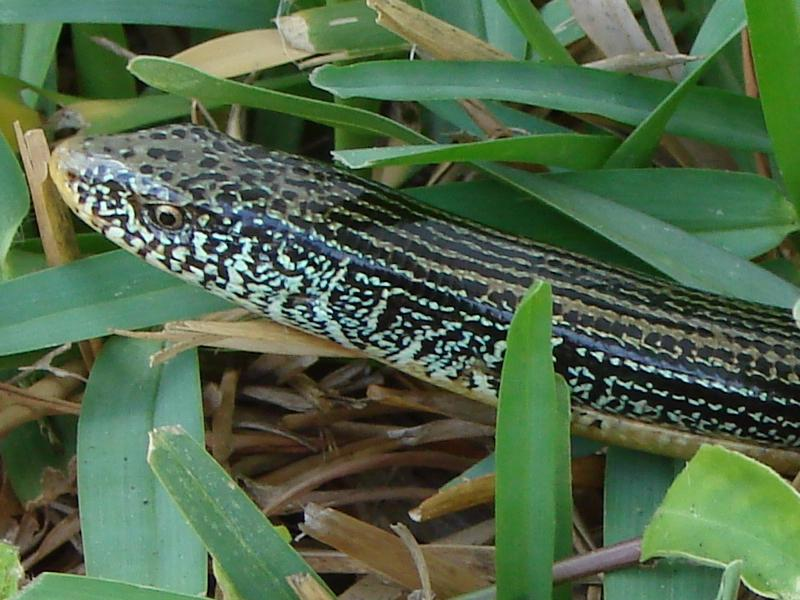
  - Portrait of a living Ophisaurus ventralis, or eastern glass lizard
    †Ophisaurus ventralis
- †Orelladjidaumo
  - †Orelladjidaumo xylodes – type locality for species
- †Oreolagus
  - †Oreolagus nebrascensis – type locality for species
- †Oropyctis
  - †Oropyctis pediasius – type locality for species
- Ortalis
  - †Ortalis tantala – type locality for species
- †Osbornodon
  - †Osbornodon fricki
  - †Osbornodon iamonensis
  - †Osbornodon renjiei
- †Oxetocyon
  - †Oxetocyon cuspidatus
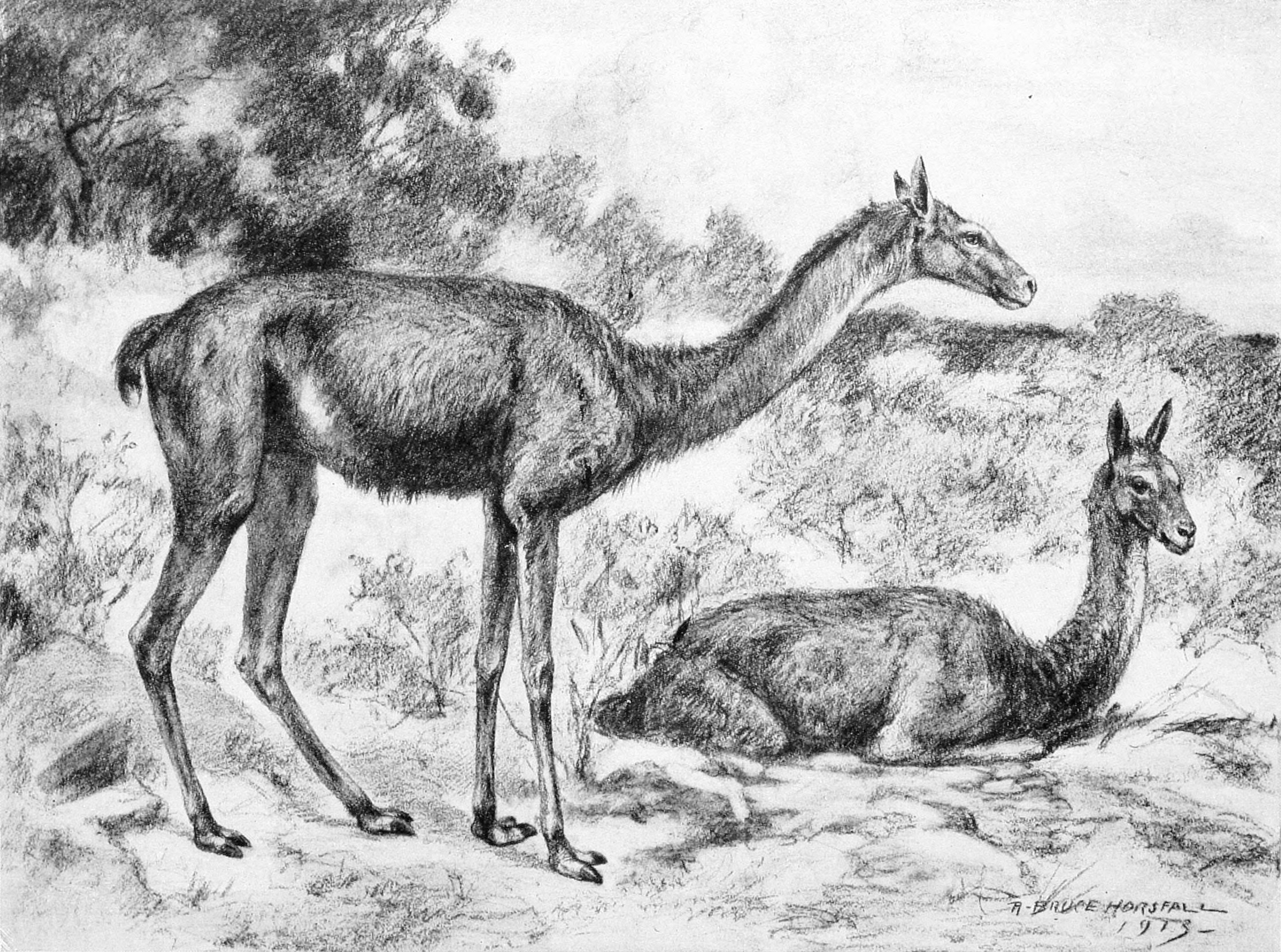
- Life restoration of a pair of the Oligocene-Miocene camel Oxydactylus. Robert Bruce Horsfall (1913).
  †Oxydactylus
  - †Oxydactylus longipes

== P ==
- †Paciculus
  - †Paciculus nebraskensis – type locality for species
- †Paenemarmota
  - †Paenemarmota barbouri
  - †Paenemarmota nevadensis – or unidentified comparable form
  - †Paenemarmota sawrockensis
- †Palaealectoris – type locality for genus
  - †Palaealectoris incertus – type locality for species
- †Palaeastur – type locality for genus
  - †Palaeastur atavus – type locality for species
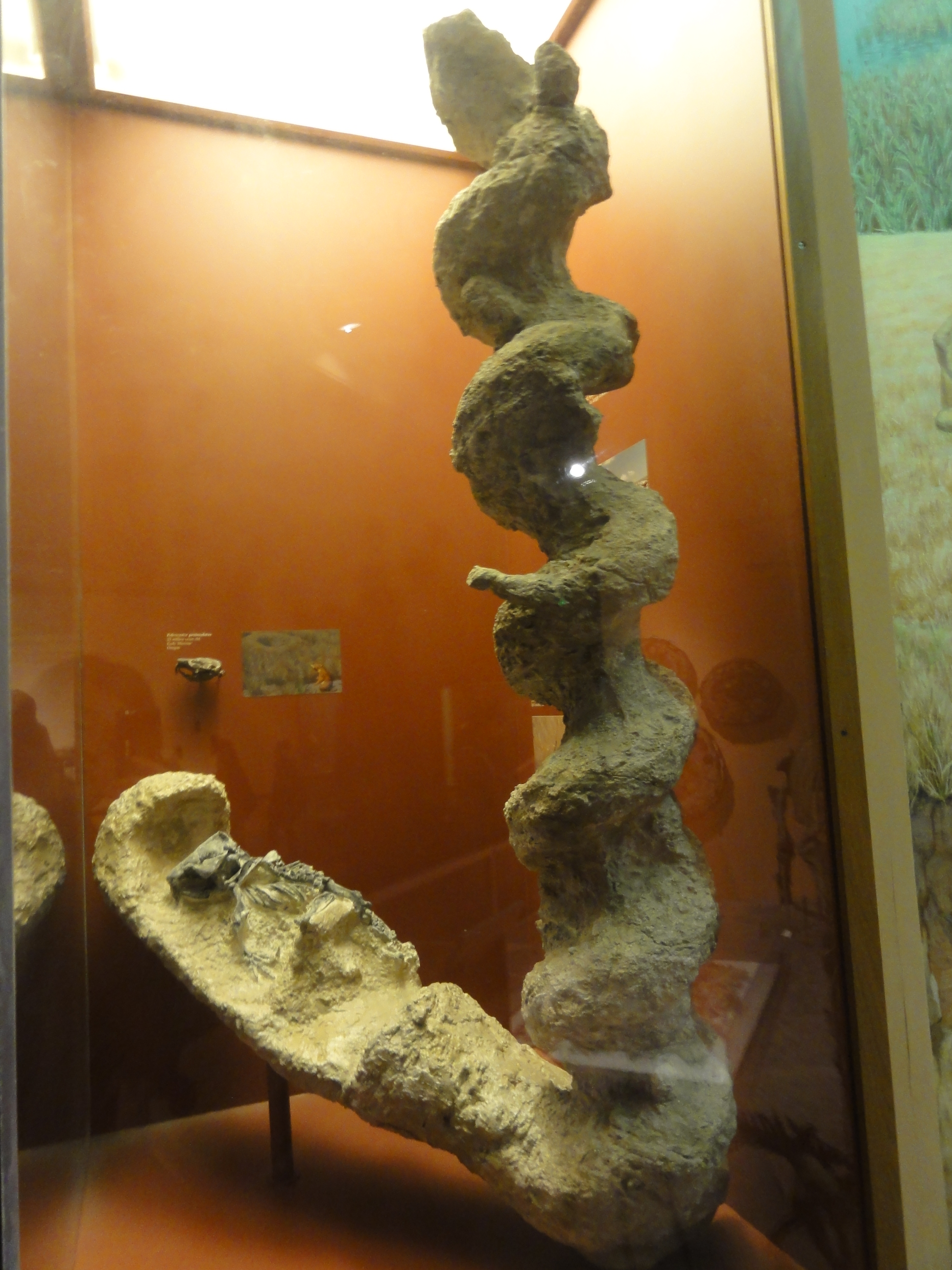
- Spiral-shaped fossilized burrow and associated skeleton of the Oligocene-Miocene beaver Palaeocastor
  †Palaeocastor
- †Palaeogale
  - †Palaeogale dorothiae
  - †Palaeogale minuta – or unidentified comparable form
- †Palaeolagus
  - †Palaeolagus burkei
  - †Palaeolagus haydeni – type locality for species
  - †Palaeolagus hemirhizis – type locality for species
  - †Palaeolagus hypsodus
  - †Palaeolagus intermedius
  - †Palaeolagus philoi
  - †Palaeolagus temnodon
- †Paleoheterodon – type locality for genus
  - †Paleoheterodon tiheni – type locality for species
- Panthera
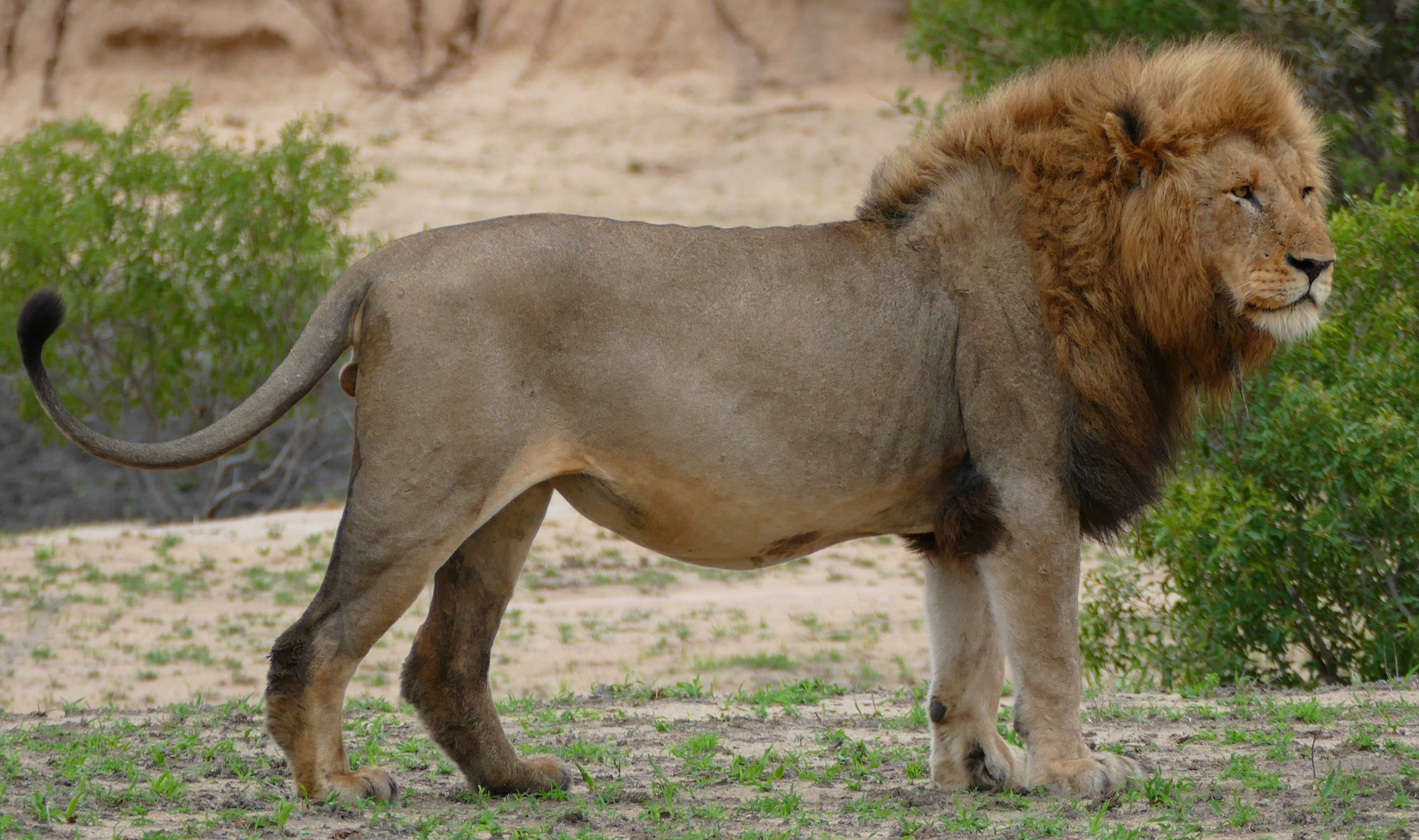
  - A living Panthera leo, or lion
    †Panthera leo
- †Parablastomeryx
  - †Parablastomeryx gregorii – type locality for species
- †Paracoluber
  - †Paracoluber storeri
- †Paracosoryx
  - †Paracosoryx dawesensis
  - †Paracosoryx wilsoni
- †Paracryptotis
- †Paractiornis – type locality for genus
  - †Paractiornis perpusillus – type locality for species
- †Paracynarctus
  - †Paracynarctus kelloggi
  - †Paracynarctus sinclairi – type locality for species
- †Paradaphoenus
  - †Paradaphoenus minimus
  - †Paradaphoenus tooheyi – type locality for species
- †Paradjidaumo
  - †Paradjidaumo trilophus
  - †Paradjidaumo validus – type locality for species
- †Paraenhydrocyon
  - †Paraenhydrocyon wallovianus
- †Paragerrhonotus – or unidentified comparable form
  - †Paragerrhonotus ricardensis
- †Parahippus
  - †Parahippus atavus
  - †Parahippus cognatus
- †Parallomys
  - †Parallomys americanus – type locality for species
- †Paramerychyus
  - †Paramerychyus harrisonensis
  - †Paramerychyus relictus
- †Paramicrotoscoptes
  - †Paramicrotoscoptes hibbardi
- †Paramiolabis
  - †Paramiolabis tenuis
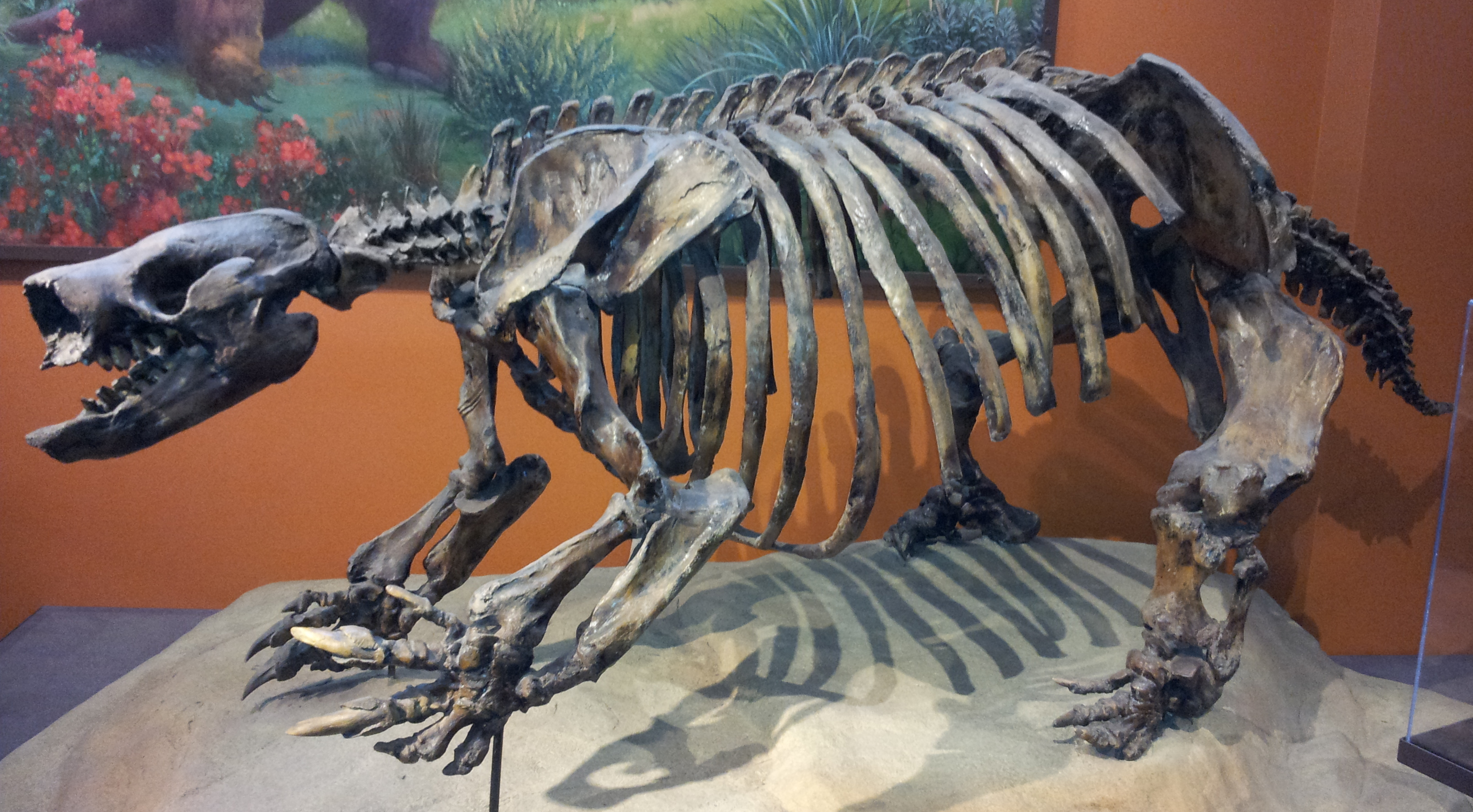
- Fossilized skeleton of the Pliocene-Pleistocene ground sloth Paramylodon
  †Paramylodon
  - †Paramylodon harlani
- †Paramys
  - †Paramys relictus
- †Paranamatomys
  - †Paranamatomys storeri
- †Parapliosaccomys
  - †Parapliosaccomys annae
  - †Parapliosaccomys hibbardi
- Parascalops – or unidentified comparable form
- †Parataxidea – or unidentified comparable form
- †Paratomarctus
  - †Paratomarctus euthos
  - †Paratomarctus temerarius
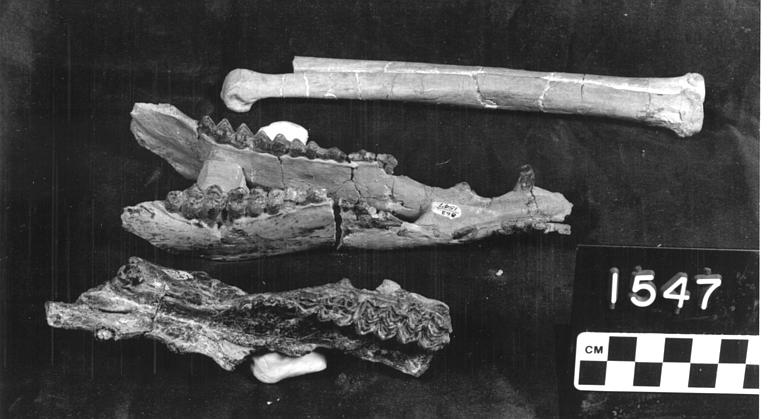
- Fossilized partial skull and limb bone of the Eocene-Oligocene camel Paratylopus
  †Paratylopus
  - †Paratylopus labiatus
  - †Paratylopus primaevus
- †Parictis
  - †Parictis gilpini
- †Paronychomys
- †Parophisaurus
  - †Parophisaurus pawneensis
- †Parvericius
  - †Parvericius montanus
  - †Parvericius voorhiesi – type locality for species
- †Parvitragulus – tentative report
- †Pediohierax – type locality for genus
  - †Pediohierax ramenta – type locality for species
- †Pediolophodon
- †Pediomeryx
  - †Pediomeryx hemphillensis – or unidentified comparable form
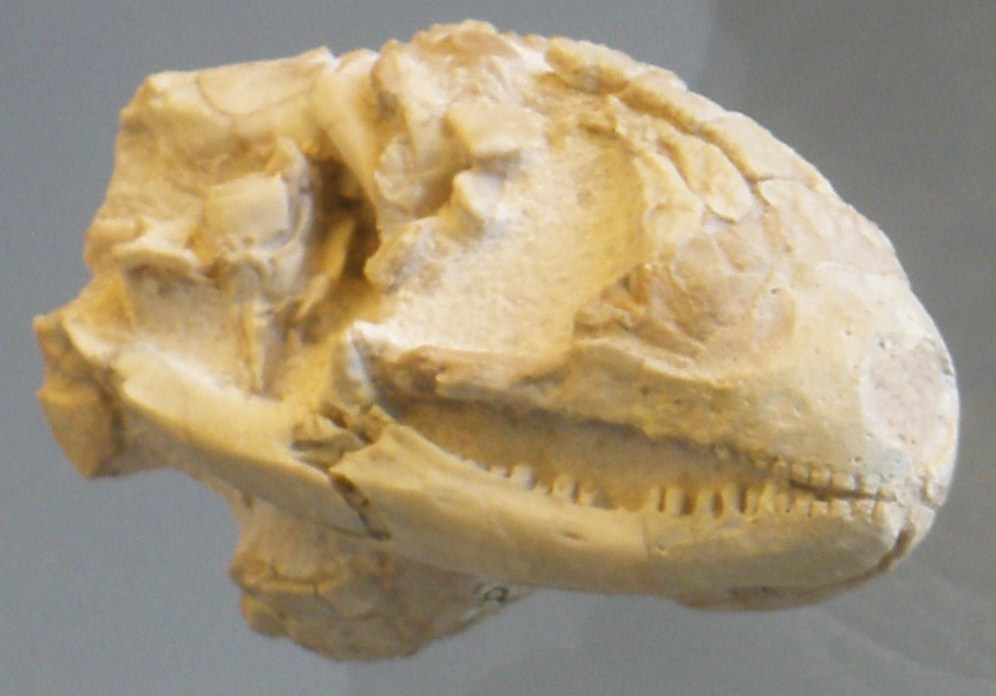
- Fossilized skull of the Eocene-Oligocene lizard Peltosaurus
  †Peltosaurus
  - †Peltosaurus granulosus
- †Pelycomys
  - †Pelycomys brulanus – type locality for species
  - †Pelycomys placidus – or unidentified comparable form
- †Penetrigonias
  - †Penetrigonias dakotensis – type locality for species
- †Peraceras
  - †Peraceras profectum
  - †Peraceras superciliosum
- †Perchoerus
  - †Perchoerus probus – tentative report
- †Peridiomys
  - †Peridiomys borealis
  - †Peridiomys rusticus – type locality for species
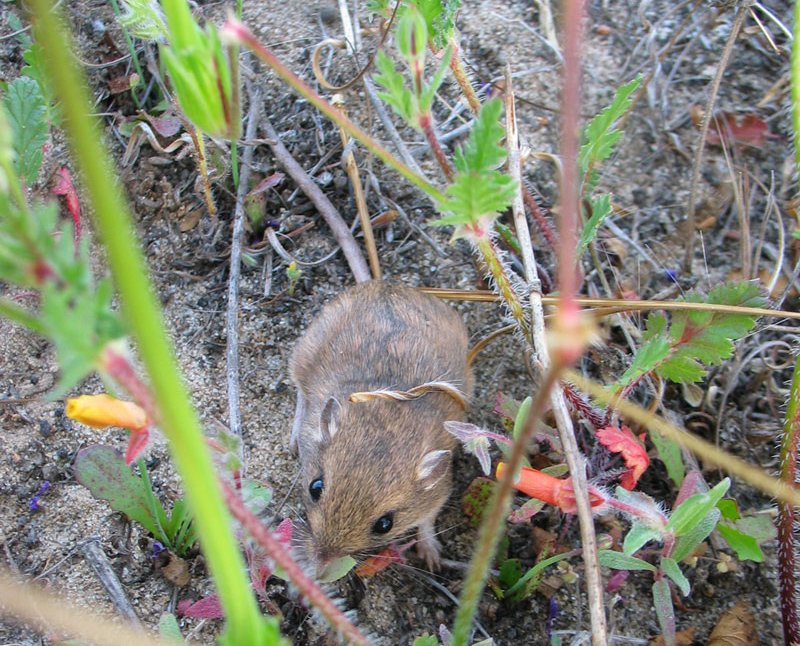
- A living Perognathus pocket mouse
  Perognathus
  - †Perognathus brevidens
  - †Perognathus coquorum
  - †Perognathus furlongi – or unidentified comparable form
  - †Perognathus minutus – or unidentified comparable form
  - †Perognathus pearlettensis
  - †Perognathus trojectioansrum
- Peromyscus
  - †Peromyscus kansasensis – or unidentified comparable form
- †Petauristodon
- †Petenyia – or unidentified comparable form
- †Phasianus
  - †Phasianus mioceanus – type locality for species
- †Phelosaccomys
- †Phenacocoelus
  - †Phenacocoelus typus – type locality for species
- Phenacomys
  - †Phenacomys intermedius – or unidentified comparable form
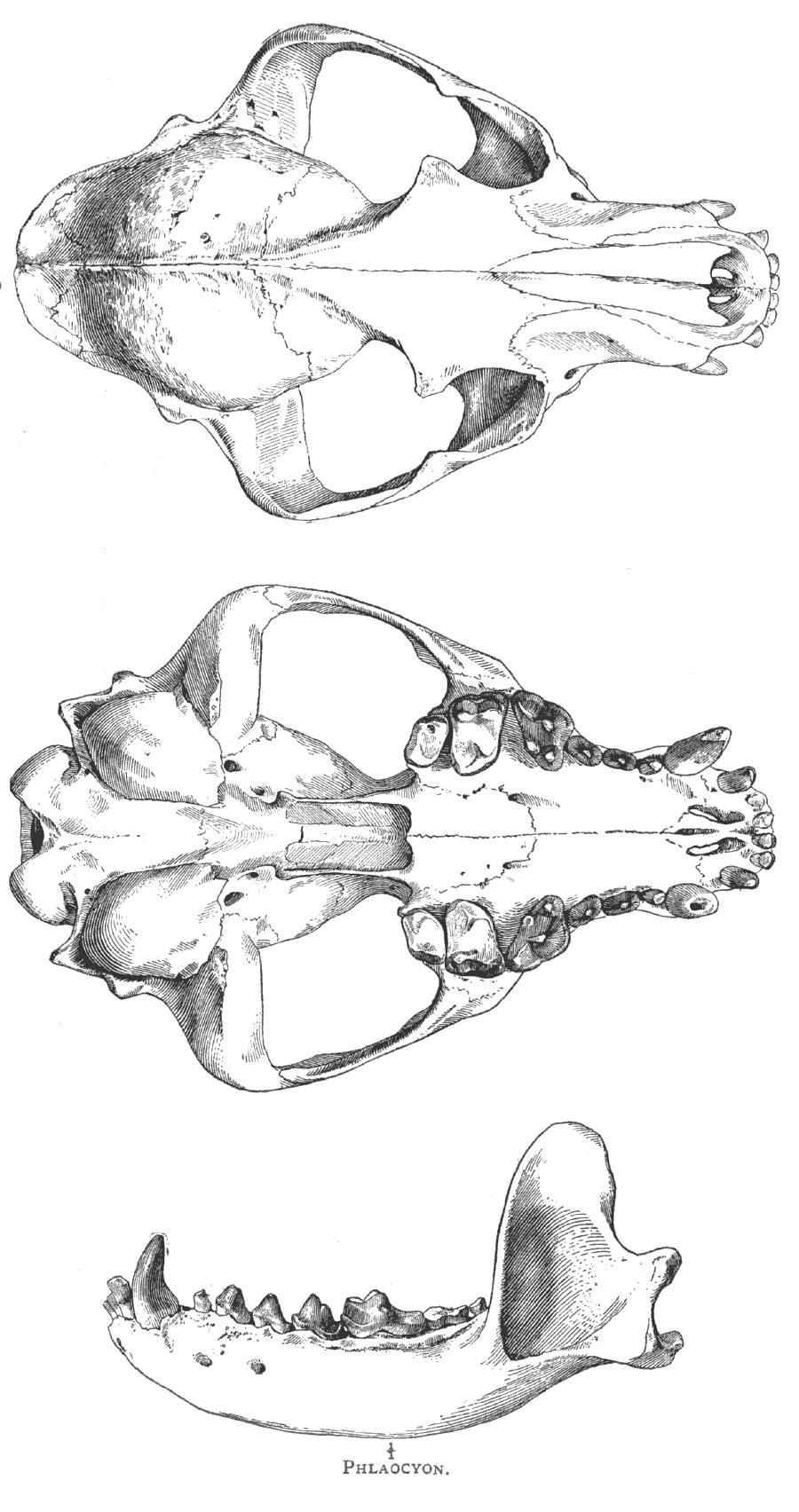
- Illustration of a fossilized skull in multiple views of the Oligocene-Miocene bone-crushing dog Phlaocyon
  †Phlaocyon
  - †Phlaocyon annectens
  - †Phlaocyon leucosteus
  - †Phlaocyon mariae – type locality for species
  - †Phlaocyon marslandensis
  - †Phlaocyon minor
  - †Phlaocyon yatkolai – type locality for species
- Phrynosoma
  - †Phrynosoma cornutum
- Picea
- Pinus
- †Pipestoneomys
  - †Pipestoneomys bisulcatus
- Pituophis
  - †Pituophis catenifer
  - †Pituophis melanoleucus
- †Planisorex
  - †Planisorex dixonensis
- Platanus
  - †Platanus vitifolia – type locality for species
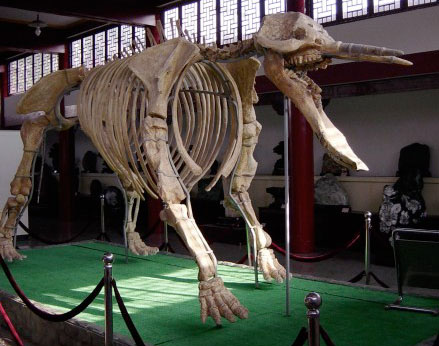
- Mounted fossilized skeleton of the Miocene elephant relative Platybelodon
  †Platybelodon
  - †Platybelodon barnumbrowni
  - †Platybelodon loomisi
- †Platygonus
  - †Platygonus compressus
  - †Platygonus pollenae – type locality for species
- †Pleiolama
  - †Pleiolama mckennai – type locality for species
  - †Pleiolama vera – or unidentified comparable form
- †Plesiogulo
  - †Plesiogulo lindsayi – or unidentified comparable form
- †Plesiosorex
  - †Plesiosorex coloradensis
  - †Plesiosorex donroosai
  - †Plesiosorex greeni
- †Pleurolicus
  - †Pleurolicus exiguus – type locality for species
  - †Pleurolicus hemingfordensis
  - †Pleurolicus sulcifrons – or unidentified comparable form
- †Pliauchenia
  - †Pliauchenia magnifontis
- †Plioceros
  - †Plioceros dehlini – type locality for species
  - †Plioceros floblairi – type locality for species
- †Pliocyon
  - †Pliocyon medius – type locality for species
- †Pliogale
  - †Pliogale furlongi
- †Pliogeomys
  - †Pliogeomys russelli – type locality for species
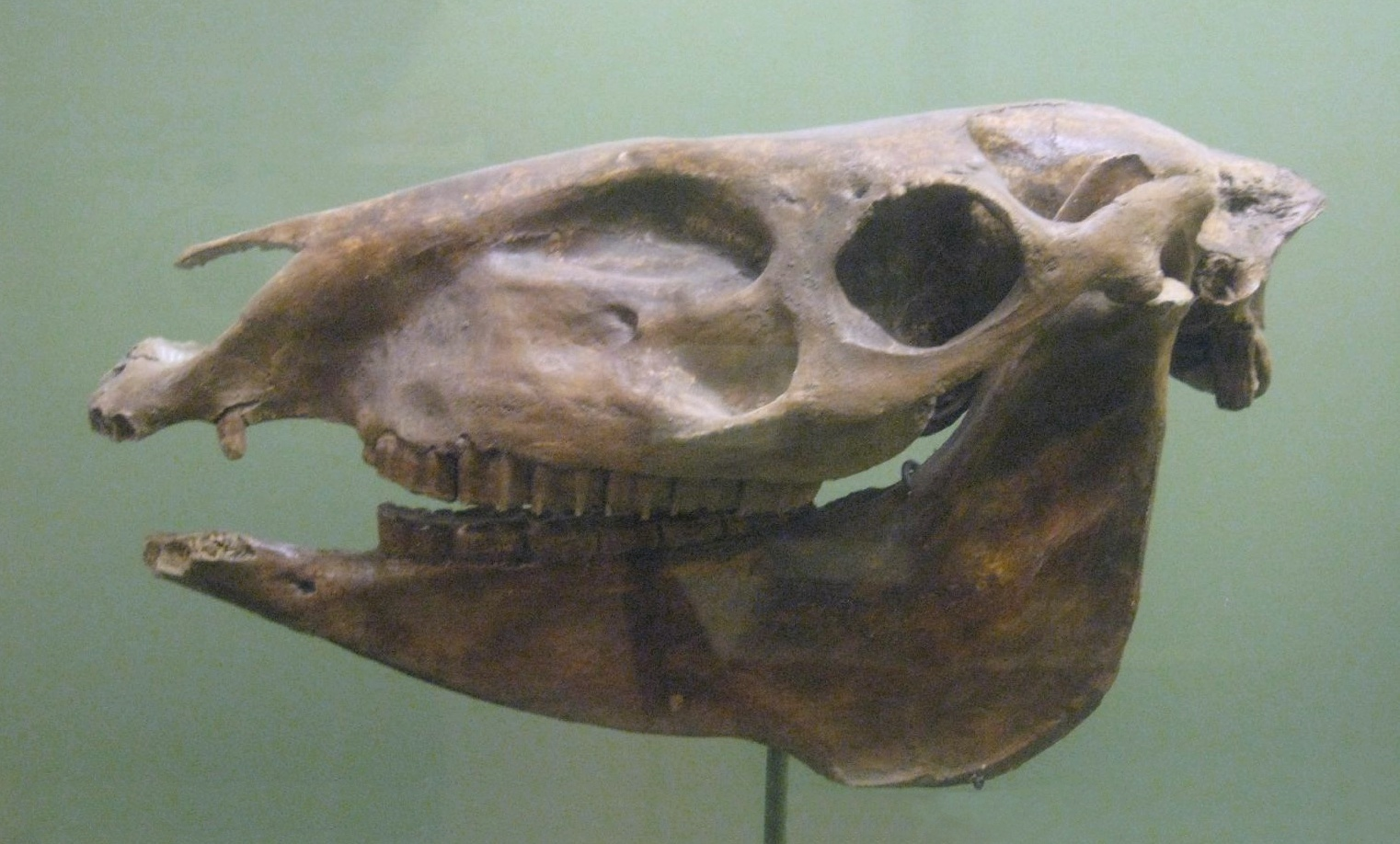
- Fossilized skull of the Miocene horse Pliohippus
  †Pliohippus
  - †Pliohippus mirabilis
  - †Pliohippus nobilis
  - †Pliohippus pernix
- †Pliolemmus
  - †Pliolemmus antiquus
- †Pliometanastes
- †Plionarctos
- †Plionictis
  - †Plionictis ogygia
- †Pliophenacomys
  - †Pliophenacomys osborni
  - †Pliophenacomys primaevus
- †Pliosaccomys
- †Pliotaxidea
  - †Pliotaxidea garberi
  - †Pliotaxidea nevadensis
- †Pliozapus
  - †Pliozapus solus – or unidentified comparable form
- †Plithocyon
- †Poebrotherium
  - †Poebrotherium eximium
  - †Poebrotherium wilsoni
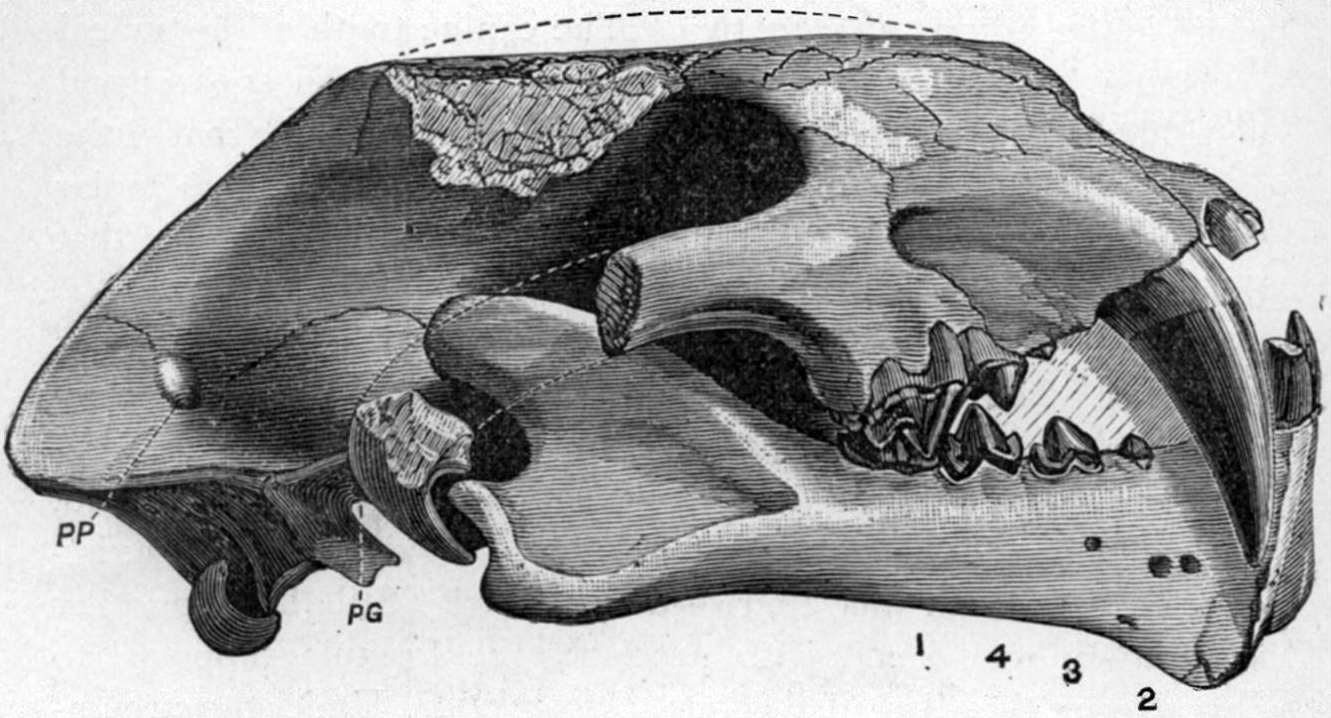
- Illustration of a fossilized skull of the Oligocene false faber-toothed cat Pogonodon
  †Pogonodon
  - †Pogonodon brachyops
- Populus
  - †Populus crassa
  - †Populus gallowayi – type locality for species
  - †Populus washoensis
- †Potamonycteris – type locality for genus
  - †Potamonycteris biperforatus – type locality for species
- †Priusaulax
  - †Priusaulax browni – type locality for species
- †Proantilocapra
  - †Proantilocapra platycornea – type locality for species
- †Probassariscus
  - †Probassariscus matthewi
- †Problastomeryx
  - †Problastomeryx primus
- †Procamelus
  - †Procamelus grandis
  - †Procamelus leptocolon
  - †Procamelus occidentalis
- †Procastoroides
  - †Procastoroides idahoensis
  - †Procastoroides sweeti – type locality for species
- †Procranioceras
  - †Procranioceras skinneri
- †Prodipodomys
- †Prodipoides
  - †Prodipoides burgensis – type locality for species
  - †Prodipoides dividerus
  - †Prodipoides katensis
- †Proharrymys
  - †Proharrymys fedti
  - †Proharrymys schlaikjeri
  - †Proharrymys wahlerti – type locality for species
- †Proheteromys
  - †Proheteromys ironcloudi
- †Promartes
  - †Promartes darbyi
  - †Promartes lepidus – or unidentified comparable form
  - †Promartes olcotti – type locality for species
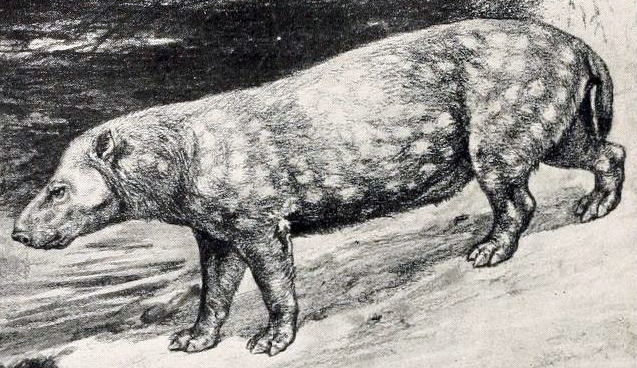
- Restoration of the Miocene hippopotamus-like oreodont Promerycochoerus both onshore and in the water. Robert Bruce Horsfall (1913).
  †Promerycochoerus
  - †Promerycochoerus carrikeri
  - †Promerycochoerus superbus
- †Promilio
  - †Promilio efferus – type locality for species
- †Promylagaulus
  - †Promylagaulus riggsi
- †Pronotolagus
  - †Pronotolagus albus
  - †Pronotolagus apachensis
  - †Pronotolagus whitei – type locality for species
- †Proscalops
  - †Proscalops miocaenus – or unidentified comparable form
  - †Proscalops secundus
  - †Proscalops tertius
- †Prosciurus
  - †Prosciurus albiclivus
  - †Prosciurus dawsonae
  - †Prosciurus magnus – type locality for species
  - †Prosciurus parvus – type locality for species
  - †Prosciurus vetustus
- †Prosomys
  - †Prosomys mimus
- †Prosthennops
  - †Prosthennops niobrarensis
  - †Prosthennops serus
  - †Prosthennops xiphodonticus
- †Prosynthetoceras
- †Protemnocyon – type locality for genus
  - †Protemnocyon inflatus – type locality for species
- †Proterix
  - †Proterix bicuspis
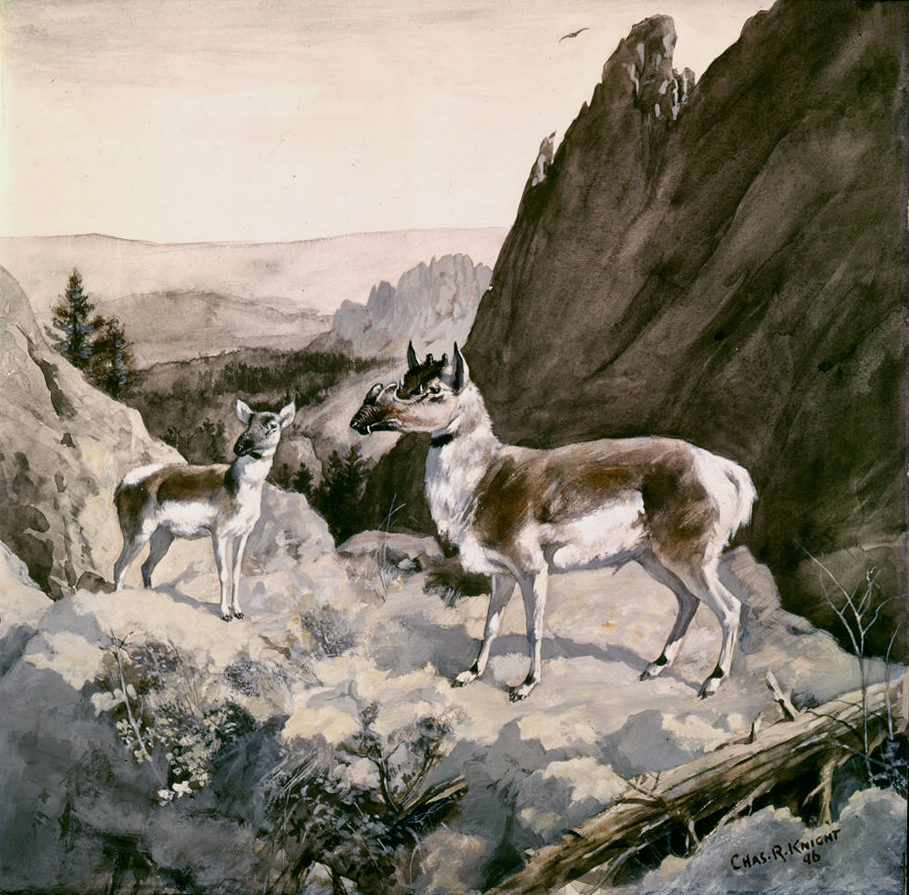
- Life restoration of a female (left) and male of the Oligocene-Miocene even-toed ungulate Protoceras. Charles R. Knight (1896).
  †Protoceras
  - †Protoceras skinneri
- †Protohippus
  - †Protohippus gidleyi
  - †Protohippus perditus
  - †Protohippus supremus
- †Protolabis
  - †Protolabis gracilis – or unidentified comparable form
  - †Protolabis heterodontus
  - †Protolabis saxeus – type locality for species
- †Protomarctus
  - †Protomarctus optatus
- †Protoprocyon
  - †Protoprocyon savagei – type locality for species
- †Protosciurus
  - †Protosciurus mengi – type locality for species
- †Protospermophilus
  - †Protospermophilus kelloggi
  - †Protospermophilus quatalensis – or unidentified comparable form
- Prunus
  - †Prunus acuminata – type locality for species
- †Psalidocyon
  - †Psalidocyon marianae
- Pseudacris
  - †Pseudacris clarki – or unidentified comparable form
  - †Pseudacris nordensis – type locality for species
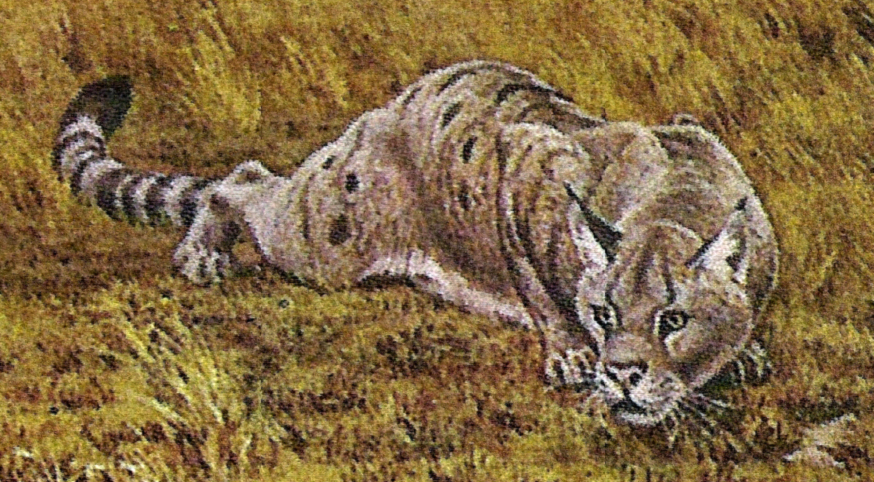
- Restoration of the Miocene cat Pseudaelurus
  †Pseudaelurus
  - †Pseudaelurus aeluroides – type locality for species
  - †Pseudaelurus intrepdius – or unidentified comparable form
  - †Pseudaelurus intrepidus
  - †Pseudaelurus marshi – type locality for species
  - †Pseudaelurus stouti
  - †Pseudaelurus validus
- †Pseudhipparion
  - †Pseudhipparion gratum – type locality for species
  - †Pseudhipparion retrusum
  - †Pseudhipparion skinneri
- †Pseudoblastomeryx
  - †Pseudoblastomeryx advena – type locality for species
- †Pseudoceras
  - †Pseudoceras skinneri – type locality for species
- †Pseudocylindrodon
  - †Pseudocylindrodon neglectus
- †Pseudocyon
- †Pseudolabis
  - †Pseudolabis dakotensis
- †Pseudomyscus
  - †Pseudomyscus bathygnathus – type locality for species
- †Pseudoparablastomeryx
  - †Pseudoparablastomeryx francescita
  - †Pseudoparablastomeryx scotti
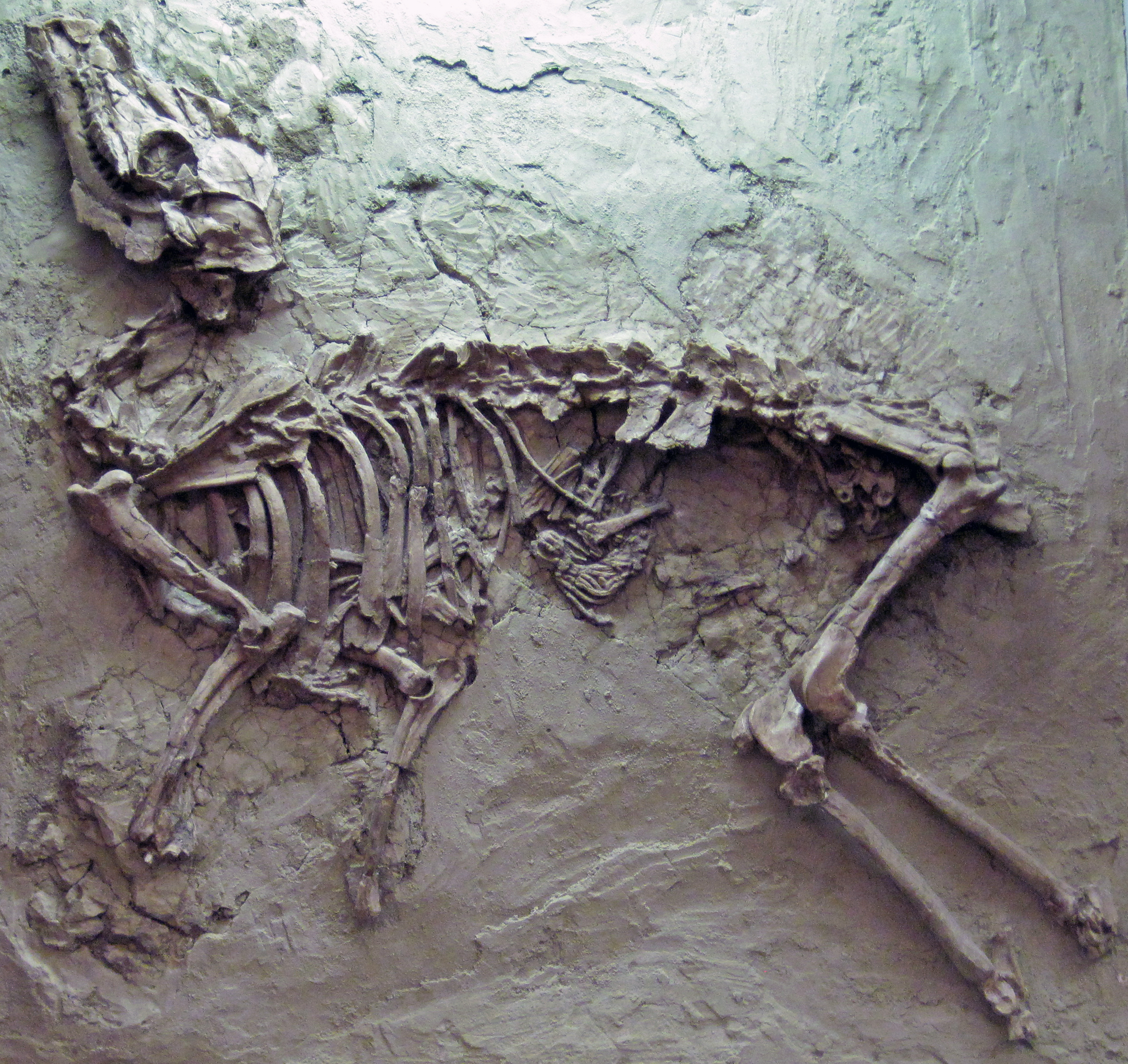
- Fossilized skeleton of the Eocene protoceratid mammal Pseudoprotoceras
  †Pseudoprotoceras
  - †Pseudoprotoceras longinaris – type locality for species
- †Pseudotheridomys
- †Pseudotrimylus
  - †Pseudotrimylus blacki – type locality for species
  - †Pseudotrimylus roperi
- Pterocarya
  - †Pterocarya oregoniana
- †Pterogaulus
  - †Pterogaulus barbarellae – type locality for species
  - †Pterogaulus laevis
- †Pterygoboa
  - †Pterygoboa miocenica
- †Pylodictis
  - †Pylodictis olivaris

== Q ==
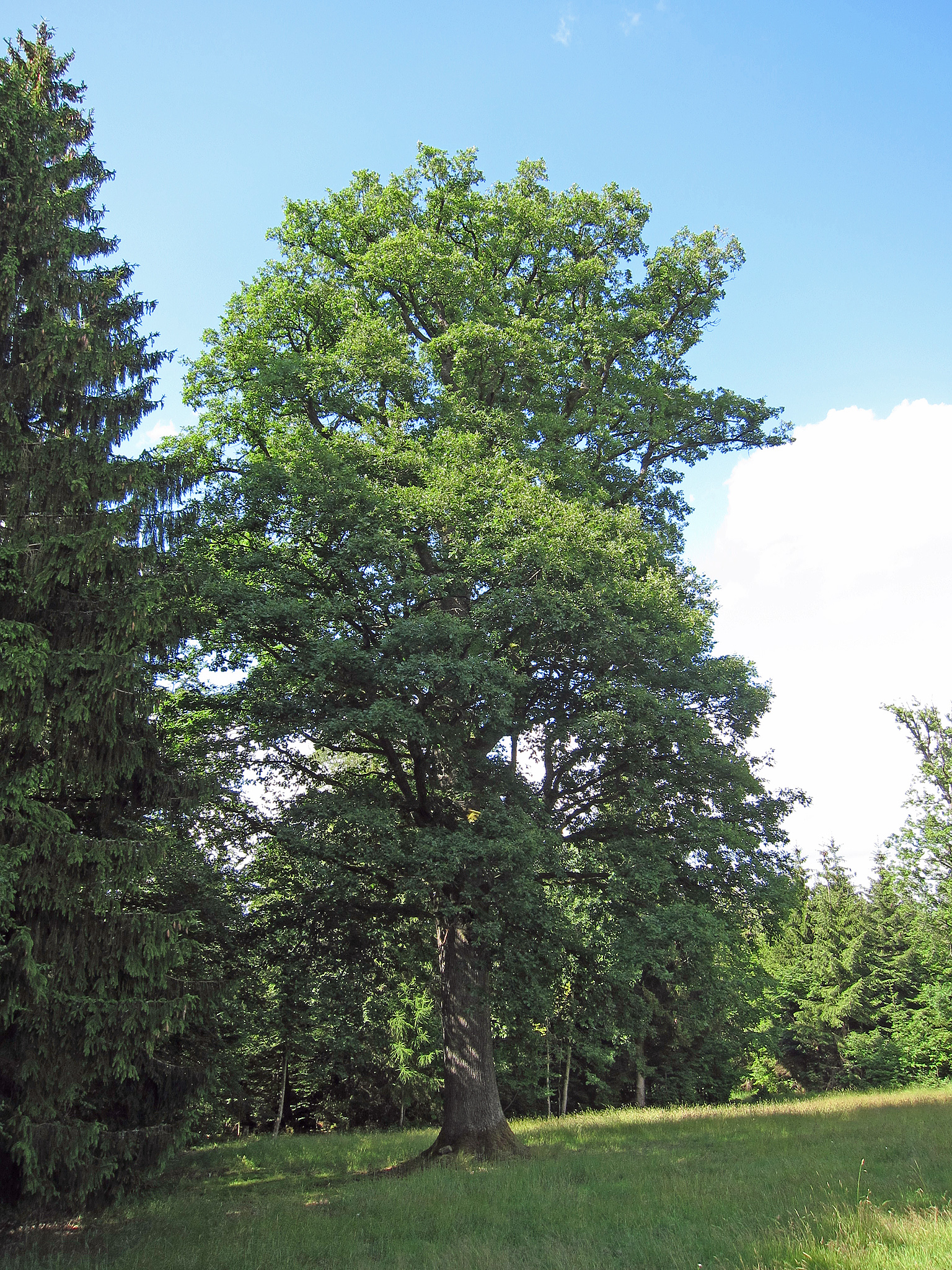
- A living Quercus, or oak tree
  Quercus
  - †Quercus argentum
  - †Quercus parvula – type locality for species
  - †Quercus preturbinella – type locality for species
  - †Quercus remingtoni

== R ==
- †Rakomeryx
  - †Rakomeryx sinclairi
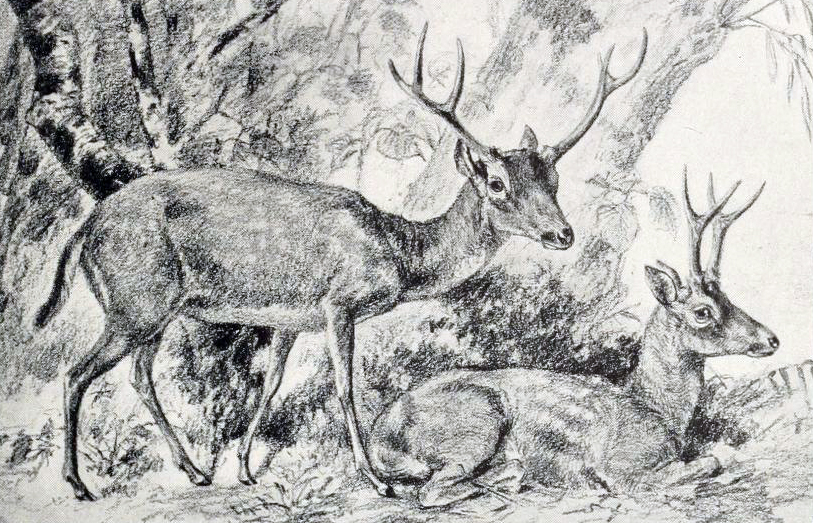
- Life restoration of the Miocene-Pliocene pronghorn Ramoceros and Cosoryx. Robert Bruce Horsfall (1913).
  †Ramoceros
  - †Ramoceros osborni
- †Rana
  - †Rana catesbeiana
  - †Rana clamitans
  - †Rana pipiens
  - †Rana sylvatica
- †Regina
  - †Regina grahami
- Reithrodontomys
  - †Reithrodontomys pratincola
- †Repomys
  - †Repomys gustelyi
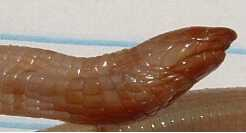
- A living Rhineura floridana, or North American worm lizard
  Rhineura
  - †Rhineura hatcherii
  - †Rhineura marslandensis – type locality for species
- Rhinocheilus
  - †Rhinocheilus lecontei
- †Ribes
  - †Ribes infrequens – type locality for species
- †Robinia
  - †Robinia lesquereuxi
- †Russellagus
  - †Russellagus vonhofi

== S ==
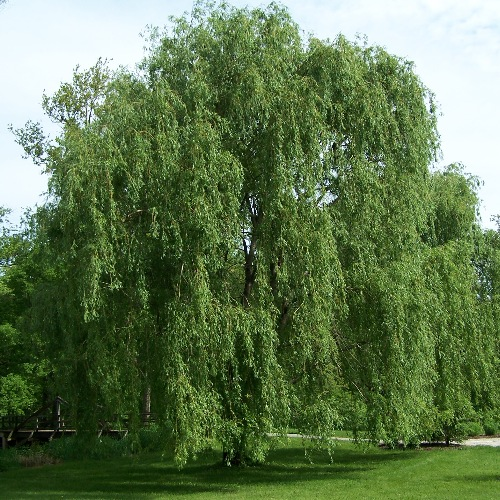
- A living Salix, or willow
  Salix
- Salvadora
  - †Salvadora paleolineata – type locality for species
- †Sanctimus
  - †Sanctimus falkenbachi – type locality for species
  - †Sanctimus stouti – or unidentified comparable form
  - †Sanctimus stuartae
- †Sarcobatus – or unidentified comparable form
- †Satherium
  - †Satherium piscinarium
- †Scalopoides
  - †Scalopoides hutchisoni – type locality for species
  - †Scalopoides isodens
  - †Scalopoides ripafodiator
- Scalopus
  - †Scalopus aquaticus
- Scaphiopus
  - †Scaphiopus wardorum – type locality for species
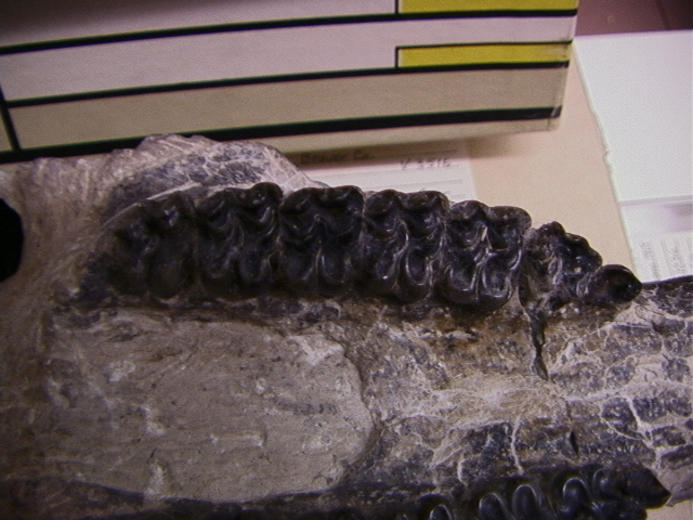
- Fossilized jaw and teeth of the Miocene horse Scaphohippus
  †Scaphohippus
  - †Scaphohippus intermontanus
  - †Scaphohippus sumani
- Sceloporus
  - †Sceloporus robustus
  - †Sceloporus undulatus
- †Schaubeumys
  - †Schaubeumys cartomylos
  - †Schaubeumys clivosus
  - †Schaubeumys grangeri
  - †Schaubeumys sabrae
- †Schizodontomys
  - †Schizodontomys amnicolus – type locality for species
  - †Schizodontomys harkseni – or unidentified comparable form
- †Scottimus
  - †Scottimus lophatus – type locality for species
  - †Scottimus viduus – type locality for species
- Sequoia – or unidentified comparable form
- †Serbelodon
  - †Serbelodon barbourensis
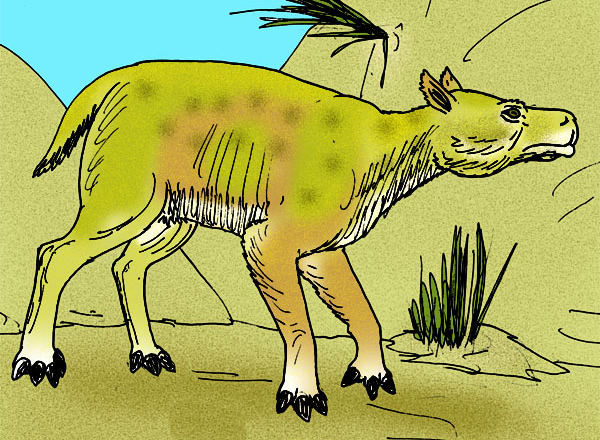
- Life restoration of two species of the Oligocene oreodont mammal genus Sespia
  †Sespia
  - †Sespia nitida
- Sigmodon
  - †Sigmodon minor
- †Simimys – tentative report
- †Sinclairella
  - †Sinclairella dakotensis
- †Sinclairomeryx
  - †Sinclairomeryx riparius – type locality for species
- Siren
- Sistrurus
  - †Sistrurus catenatus
- †Skinnerhyus – type locality for genus
  - †Skinnerhyus shermerorum – type locality for species
- †Skinneroceras – type locality for genus
  - †Skinneroceras manningi – type locality for species
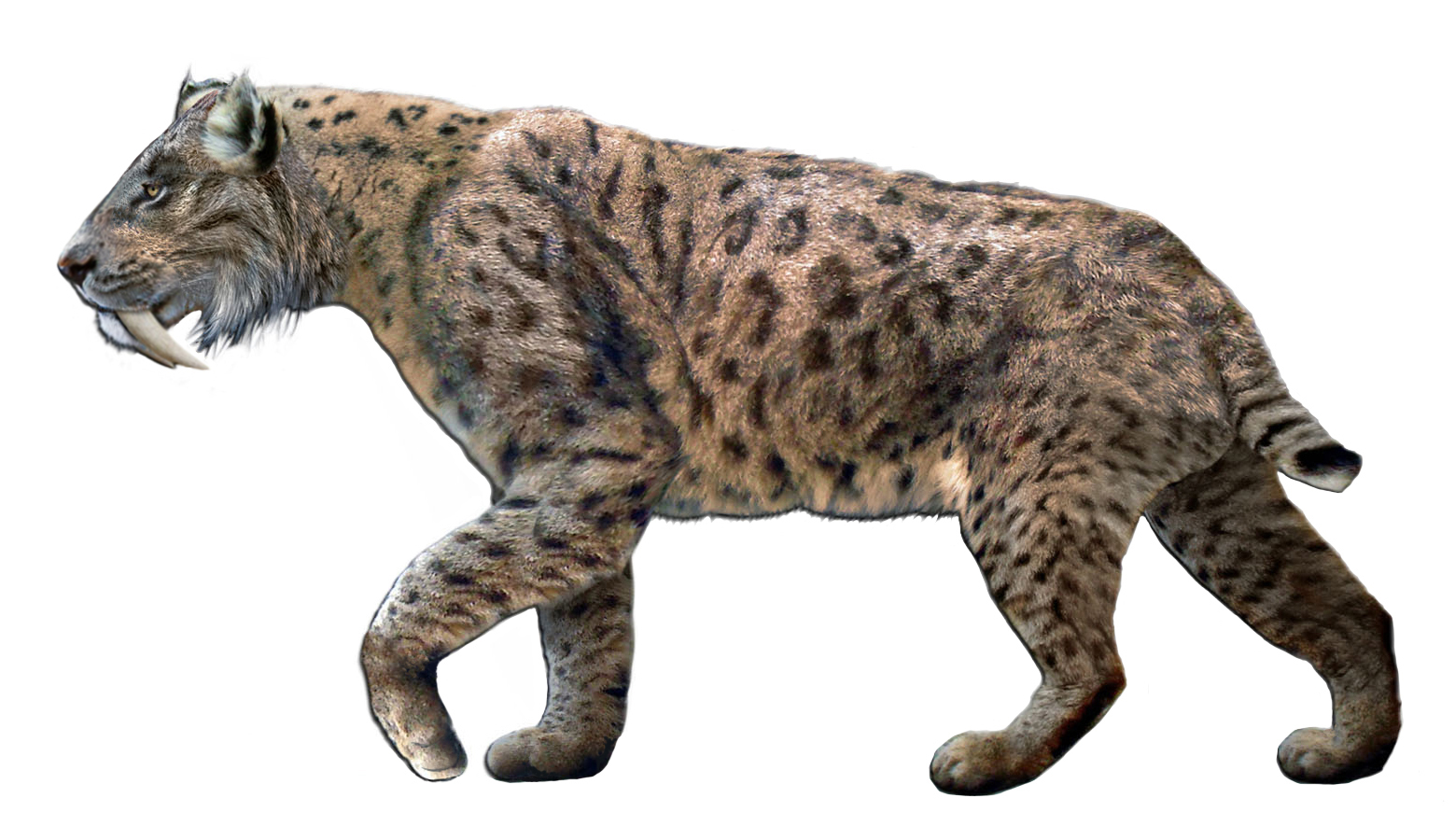
- Life restoration of the Pleistocene-Holocene saber-tooth cat Smilodon
  †Smilodon
  - †Smilodon fatalis – or unidentified comparable form
- †Sminthosinis
- Sorex
  - †Sorex arcticus
  - †Sorex cinereus
  - †Sorex edwardsi – type locality for species
  - †Sorex palustris
  - †Sorex sandersi
  - †Sorex yatkolai – type locality for species
- Spea
  - †Spea bombifrons
  - †Spea neuter
- Spermophilus
  - †Spermophilus boothi
  - †Spermophilus cyanocittus – type locality for species
  - †Spermophilus elegans
  - †Spermophilus franklinii – or unidentified comparable form
  - †Spermophilus johnstoni
  - †Spermophilus matthewi – type locality for species
  - †Spermophilus meltoni
  - †Spermophilus richardsonii
  - †Spermophilus shotwelli – or unidentified comparable form
  - †Spermophilus tridecemlineatus
- †Sphenophalos
  - †Sphenophalos middleswarti – type locality for species
- Spizaetus
  - †Spizaetus tanneri – type locality for species
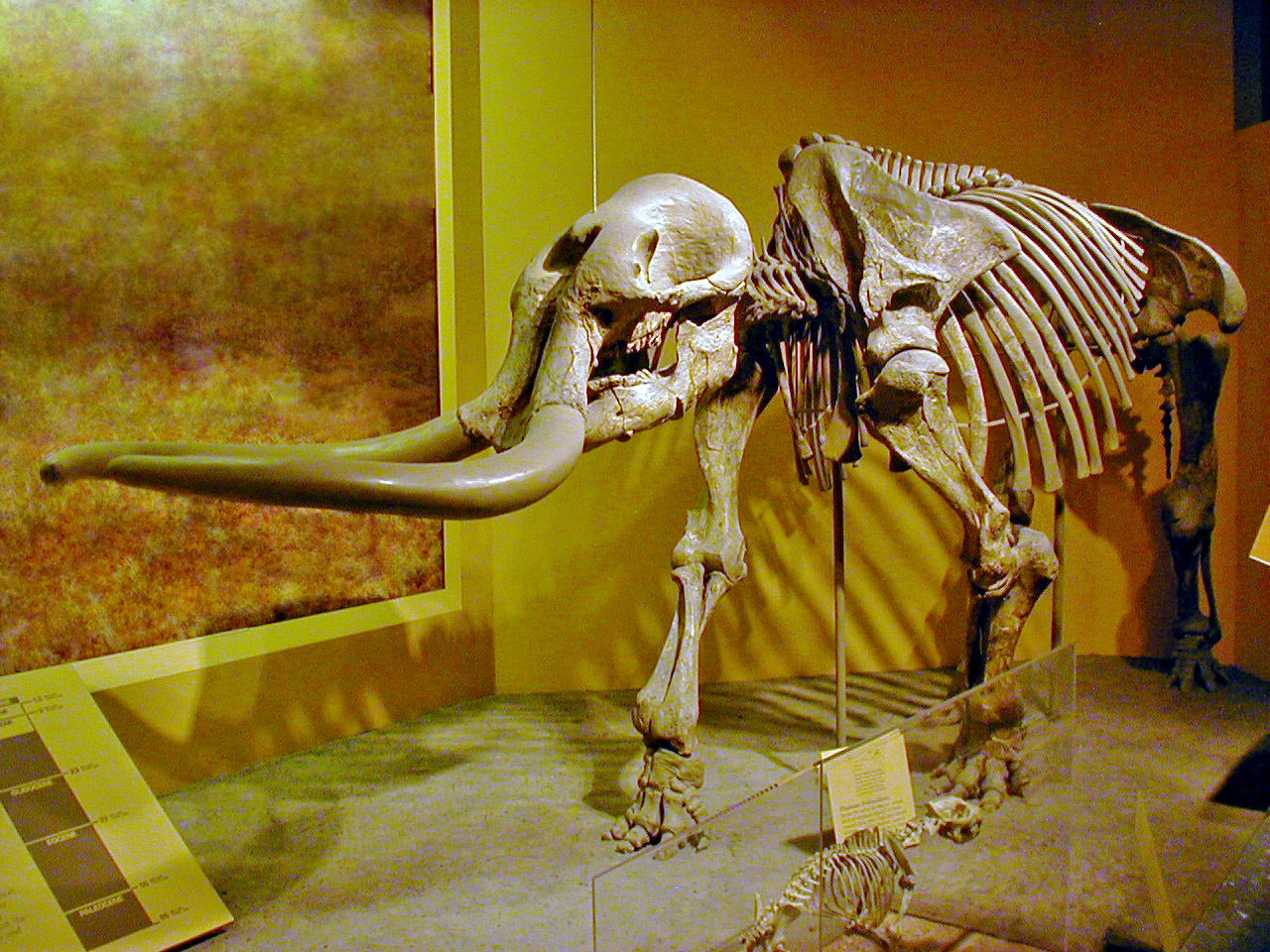
- Mounted fossilized skeleton of the Pliocene-Pleistocene elephant relative Stegomastodon
  †Stegomastodon
  - †Stegomastodon aftoniae
  - †Stegomastodon primitivus
- †Stehlinia – tentative report
- †Steneofiber
  - †Steneofiber barbouri
  - †Steneofiber fossor
- †Stenomylus
  - †Stenomylus crassipes – type locality for species
  - †Stenomylus gracilis
  - †Stenomylus hitchcocki – type locality for species
- Sthenictis
  - †Sthenictis bellus – type locality for species
  - †Sthenictis dolichops – type locality for species
- †Stibarus
  - †Stibarus obtusilobus
  - †Stibarus quadricuspis
- †Stratimus
  - †Stratimus strobeli – type locality for species
- †Stuckyhyus
  - †Stuckyhyus siouxensis – type locality for species
- †Stylemys
  - †Stylemys nebrascensis
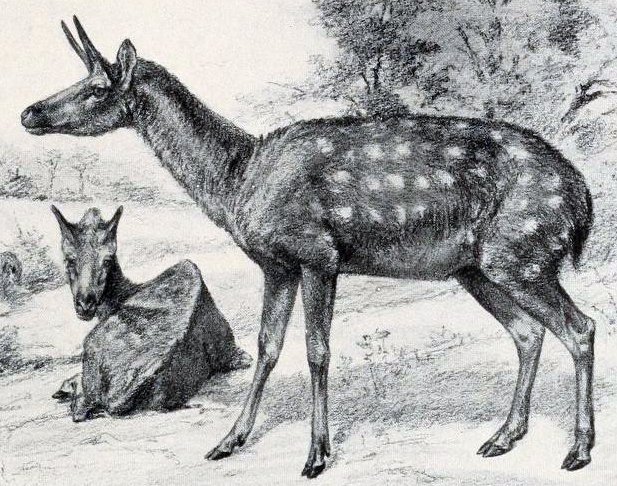
- Life restoration of the Miocene deer relative Subdromomeryx. Robert Bruce Horsfall (1913).
  †Subdromomeryx
  - †Subdromomeryx antilopinus
- †Subhyracodon
  - †Subhyracodon mitis
- †Submeryceros
  - †Submeryceros minor
- †Sunkahetanka
  - †Sunkahetanka geringensis
- Sylvilagus
  - †Sylvilagus floridanus
- Synaptomys
  - †Synaptomys cooperi
- †Syndyoceras
  - †Syndyoceras cooki – type locality for species
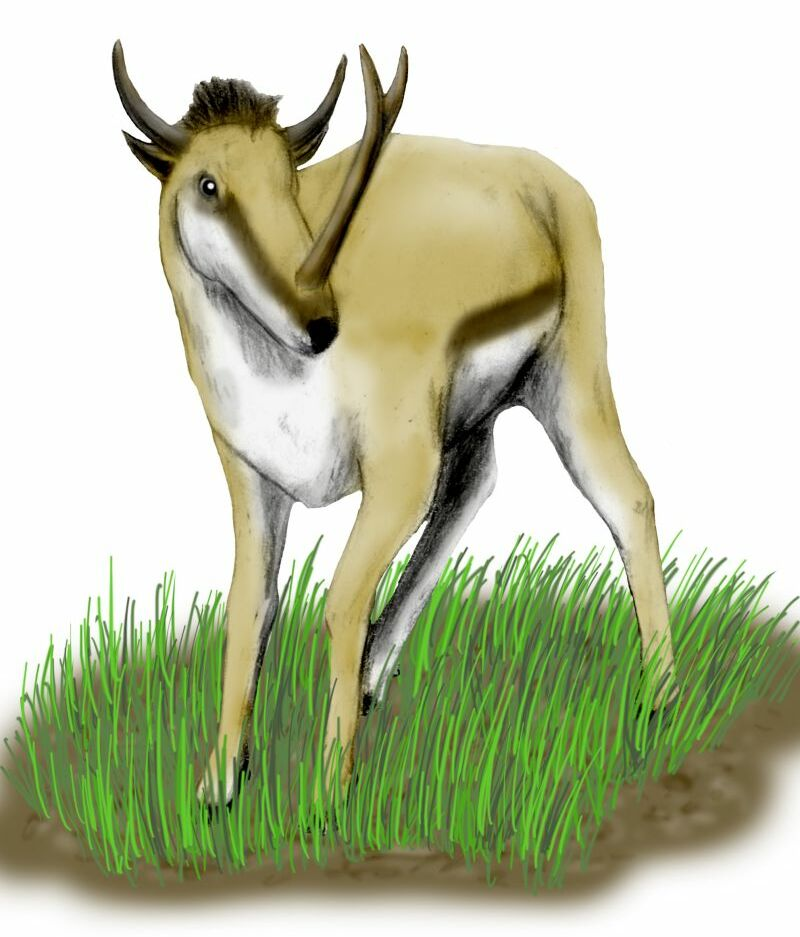
- Life restoration of the Miocene even-toed ungulate Synthetoceras
  †Synthetoceras
  - †Synthetoceras tricornatus

== T ==
- Tamias
  - †Tamias ateles
- †Tanymykter
  - †Tanymykter brachyodontus
  - †Tanymykter longirostris – type locality for species
- Tapirus
  - †Tapirus johnsoni – type locality for species
  - †Tapirus polkensis – or unidentified comparable form
  - †Tapirus simpsoni
- Taxidea
  - †Taxidea taxus
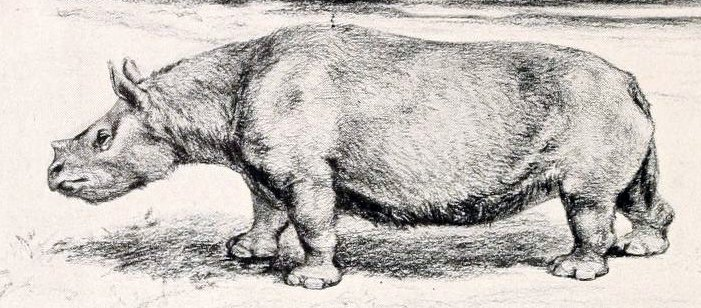
- Restoration of the Miocene-Pliocene rhinoceros Teleoceras
  †Teleoceras
  - †Teleoceras americanum
  - †Teleoceras fossiger
  - †Teleoceras hicksi
  - †Teleoceras major – type locality for species
  - †Teleoceras medicornutum
  - †Teleoceras meridianum
- †Temnocyon
  - †Temnocyon percussor – type locality for species
  - †Temnocyon typicus – type locality for species
- †Temperocastor
  - †Temperocastor valentinensis
- †Tenudomys
  - †Tenudomys basilaris – type locality for species
  - †Tenudomys ridgeviewensis – type locality for species
  - †Tenudomys titanus
- †Tephrocyon
  - †Tephrocyon scitulus
- Terrapene
  - †Terrapene corneri – type locality for species
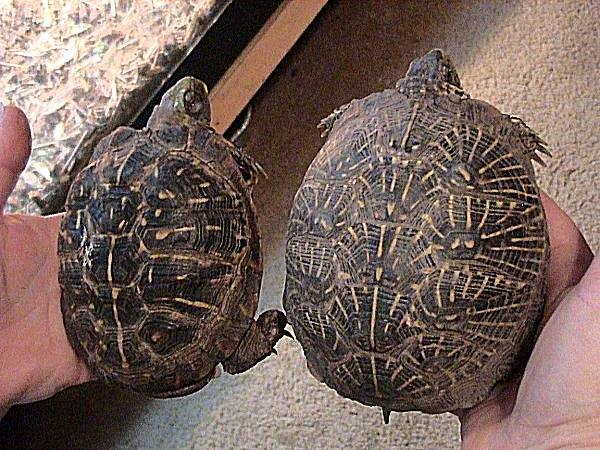
  - Living Terrapene ornata, or western box turtles
    †Terrapene ornata – type locality for species
- †Tetrabelodon
  - †Tetrabelodon osborni
- †Texasophis
- †Texoceros
  - †Texoceros altidens – type locality for species
  - †Texoceros guymonensis
- Thamnophis
  - †Thamnophis proximus
  - †Thamnophis radix
  - †Thamnophis sirtalis
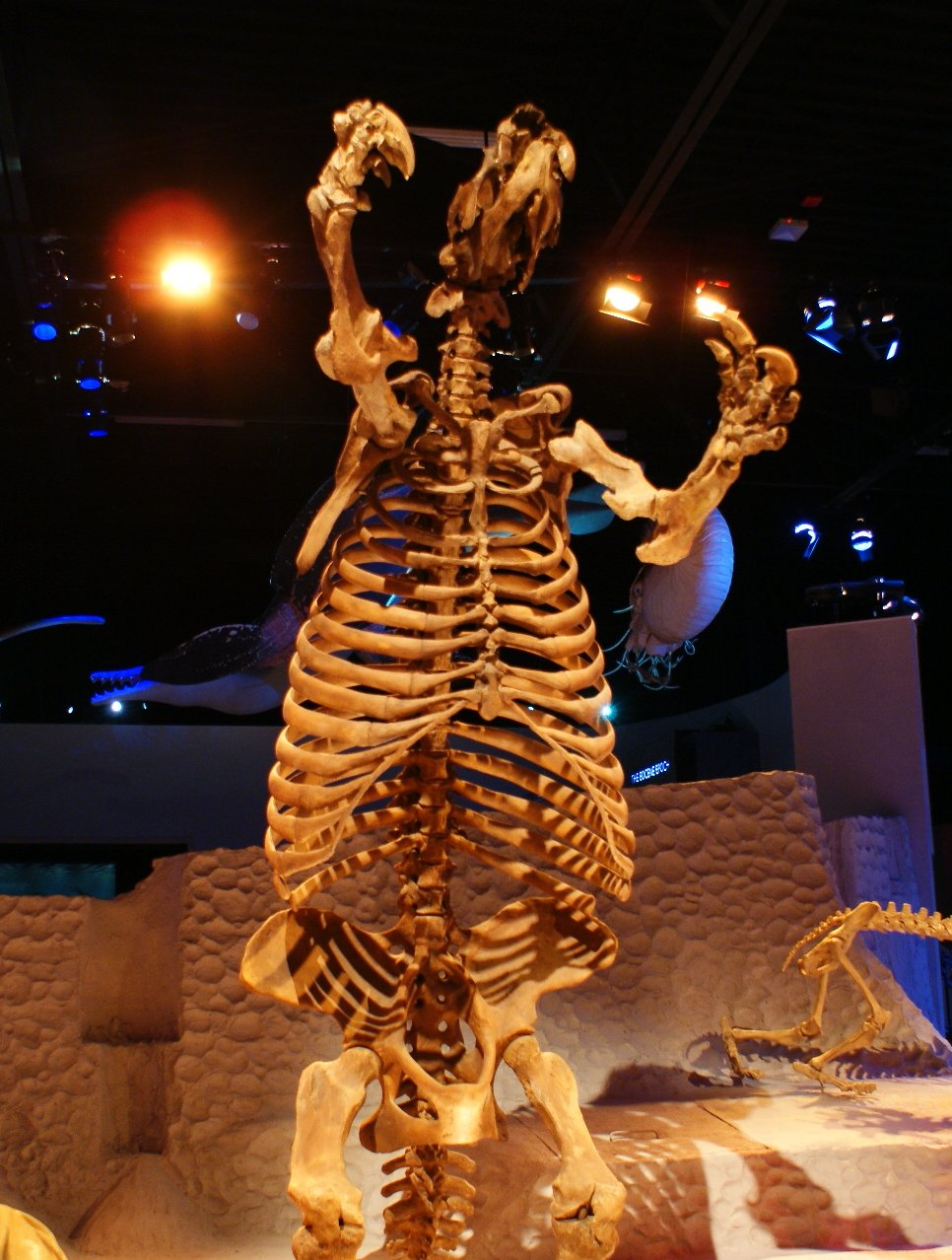
- Mounted fossilized skeleton of the Miocene-Pliocene ground sloth Thinobadistes
  †Thinobadistes
- †Thinohyus
- Thomomys
- †Thylacaelurus
  - †Thylacaelurus montanus
- †Ticholeptus
  - †Ticholeptus zygomaticus
- Tilia
- †Titanotylopus
  - †Titanotylopus nebraskensis – type locality for species
- †Tomarctus
  - †Tomarctus brevirostris
  - †Tomarctus hippophaga – type locality for species
- Trachemys
  - †Trachemys inflata – or unidentified comparable form
- †Tregophis
  - †Tregophis brevirachis
- †Trigenicus
  - †Trigenicus profectus
- †Trigonias
  - †Trigonias osborni
  - †Trigonias wellsi
- †Trigonictis
  - †Trigonictis cookii
  - †Trigonictis macrodon
- †Trilaccogaulus
  - †Trilaccogaulus ovatus
- Trionyx
  - †Trionyx quinni – type locality for species
- Tropidoclonion – or unidentified comparable form
- †Tylionomys
  - †Tylionomys voorhiesi – type locality for species
  - †Tylionomys woodi
- †Tylocephalonyx
  - †Tylocephalonyx skinneri – type locality for species

== U ==
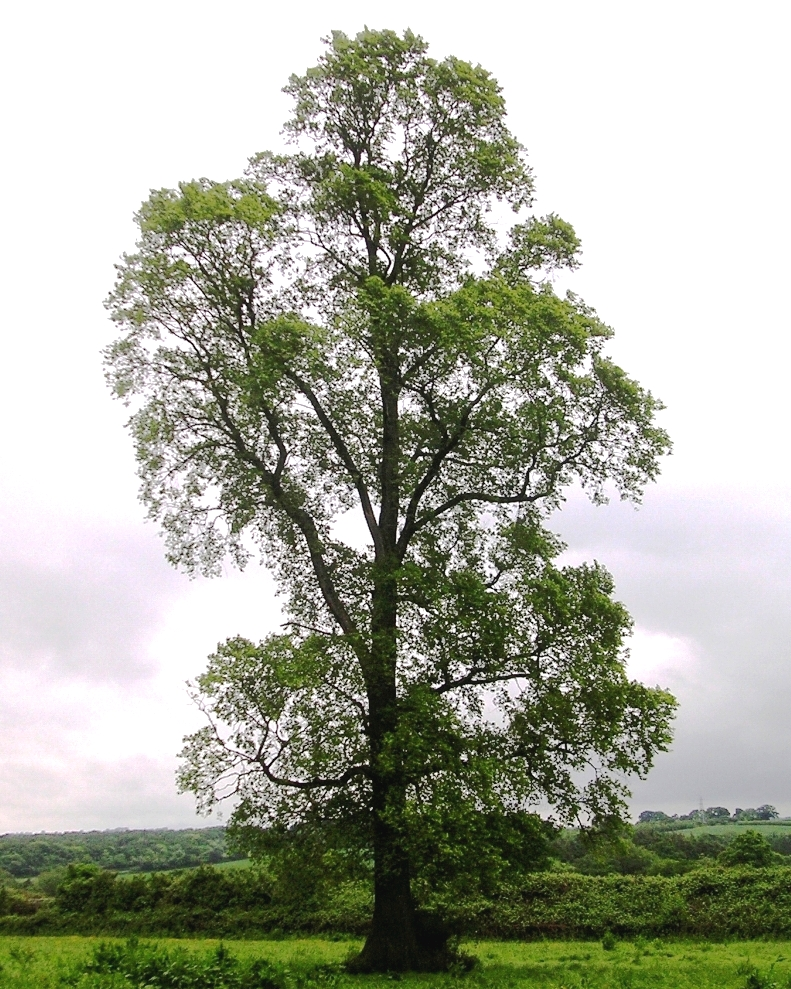
- A living Ulmus, or elm
  Ulmus
  - †Ulmus speciosa
- †Umbogaulus
  - †Umbogaulus galushai – type locality for species
  - †Umbogaulus monodon – type locality for species
- †Untermannerix
  - †Untermannerix copiosus
- Urocyon
- †Ursavus
  - †Ursavus brevirhinus – or unidentified comparable form
- †Urubitinga
  - †Urubitinga enecta – type locality for species
- †Ustatochoerus
  - †Ustatochoerus major
  - †Ustatochoerus medius

== V ==
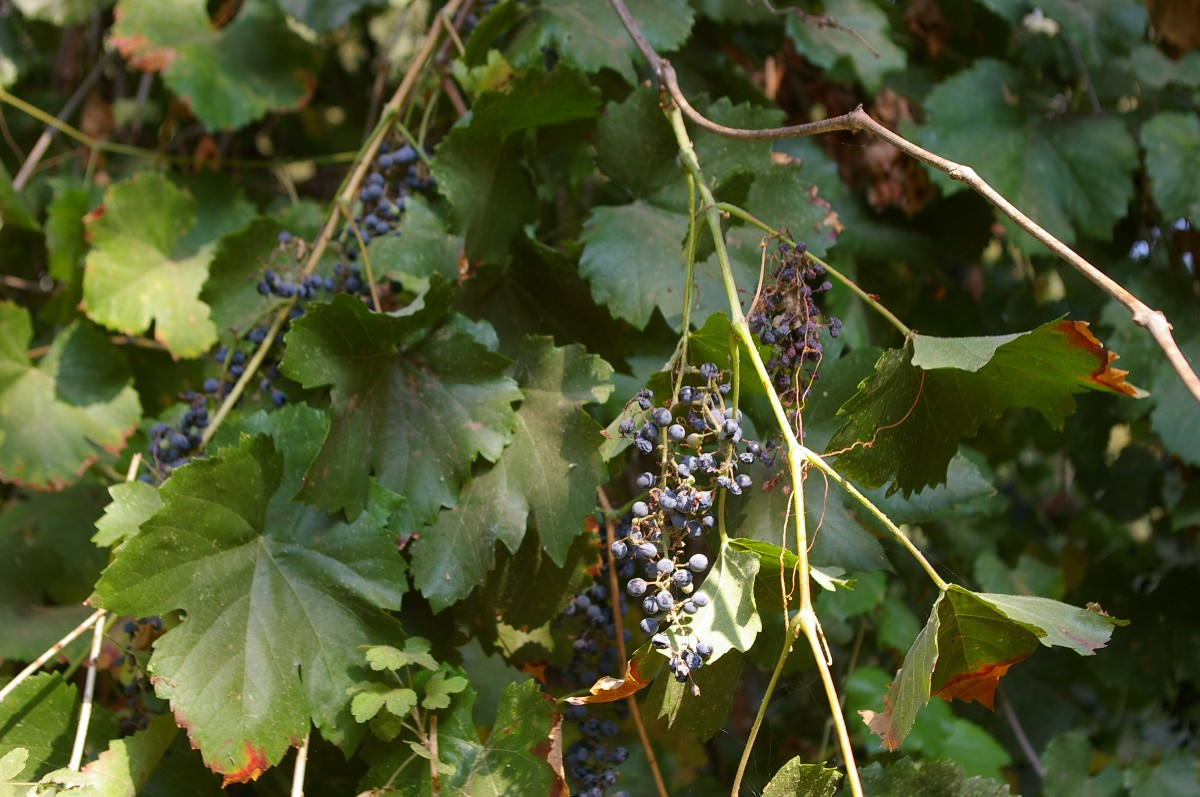
- Leaves and fruit of a living Vitis, or grapevine
  Vitis
  - †Vitis pannosa – type locality for species
- Vulpes
  - †Vulpes stenognathus
  - †Vulpes velox

== W ==
- †Wilsoneumys
  - †Wilsoneumys planidens
- †Wrightohyus
  - †Wrightohyus yatkolai

== Y ==
- †Yatkolamys
  - †Yatkolamys edwardsi – type locality for species
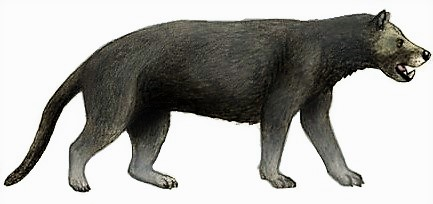
- Life restoration of the Miocene bear dog Ysengrinia
  †Ysengrinia
  - †Ysengrinia americana
- †Yumaceras
  - †Yumaceras figginsi

== Z ==
- Zapus
  - †Zapus hudsonius
  - †Zapus sandersi
- †Zemiodontomys
  - †Zemiodontomys burkei
- †Zetamys
  - †Zetamys nebraskensis
- †Ziamys
  - †Ziamys hugeni
- †Zodiolestes
  - †Zodiolestes daimonelixensis – type locality for species
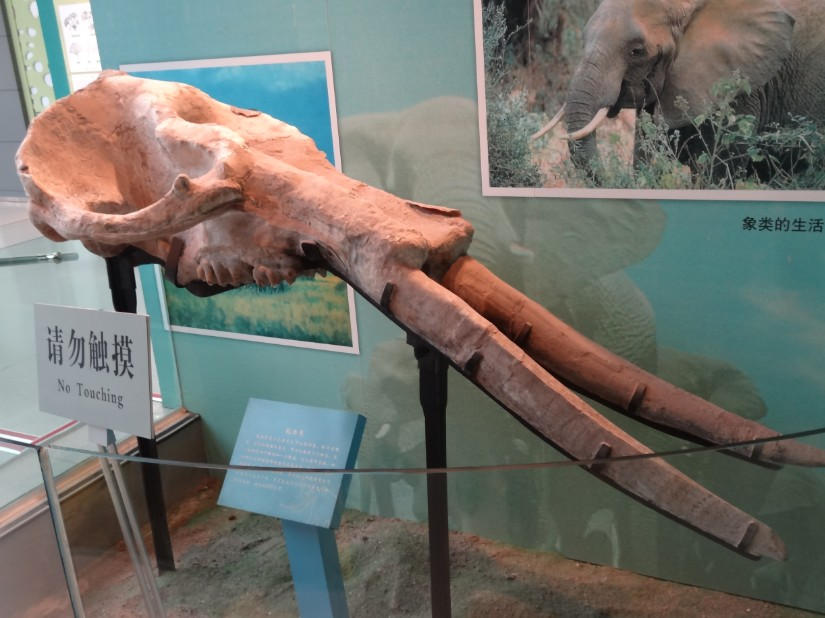
- Fossilized cranium of the Miocene-Pleistocene mastodon relative Zygolophodon
  †Zygolophodon
