= List of the Cenozoic life of Idaho =

This list of the Cenozoic life of Idaho contains the various prehistoric life-forms whose fossilized remains have been reported from within the US state of Idaho and are between 66 million and 10,000 years of age.

== A ==
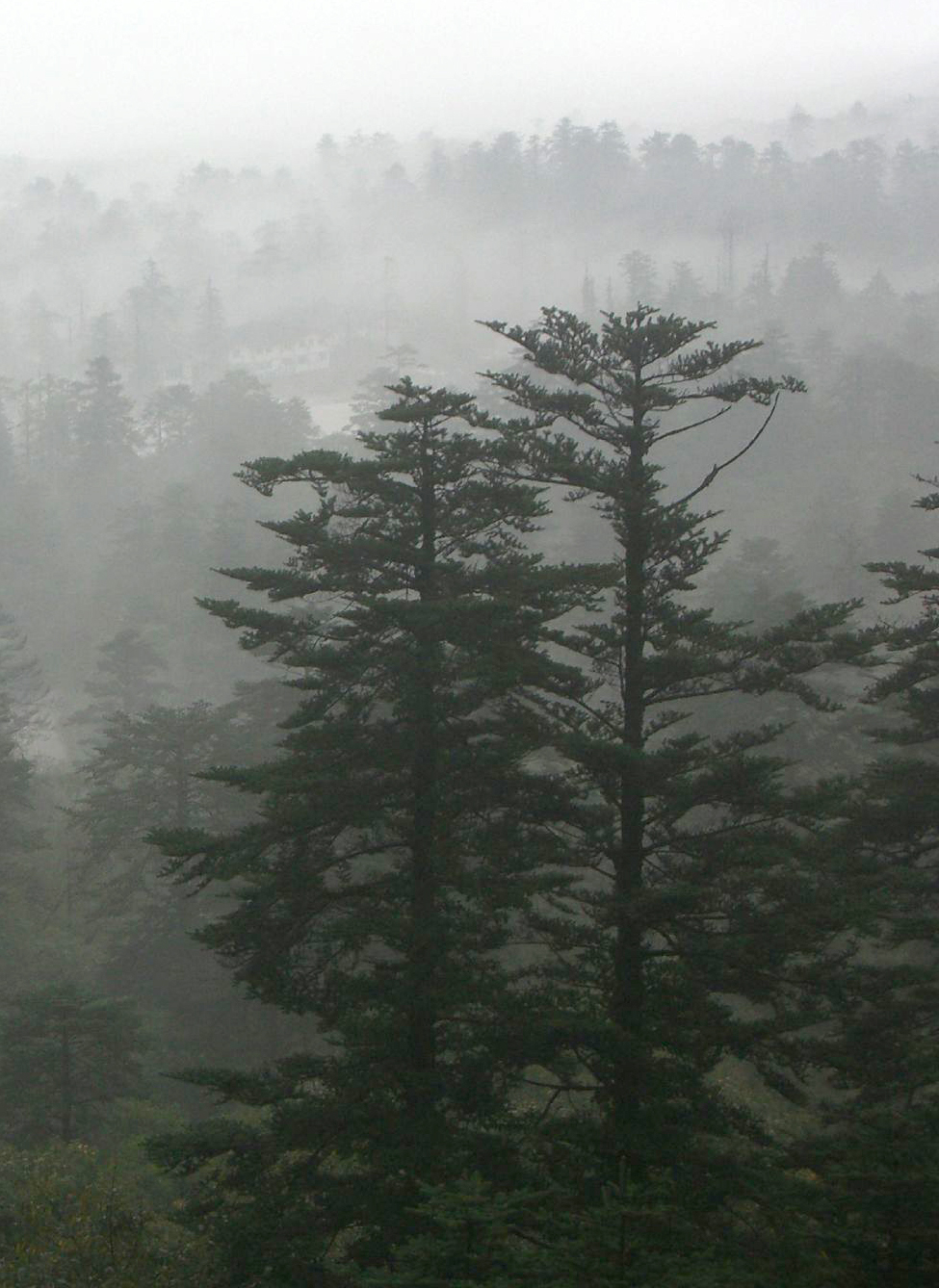
- Living Abies, or fir trees
  Abies
  - †Abies alvordensis
  - †Abies concoloroides
  - †Abies conncoloroides
  - †Abies idahoensis – type locality for species
  - †Abies klamathensis
  - †Abies sonomensis
  - †Abies toxirivus
- Acer
  - †Acer bendirei
  - †Acer bolanderi
  - †Acer columbianum
  - †Acer florissanti
  - †Acer glabroides
  - †Acer hueberi
  - †Acer idahoensis
  - †Acer macginitiei
  - †Acer minor
  - †Acer oregonianum
  - †Acer salmonensis
  - †Acer scottiae
  - †Acer tiffneyi
- †Acritohippus
  - †Acritohippus isonesus
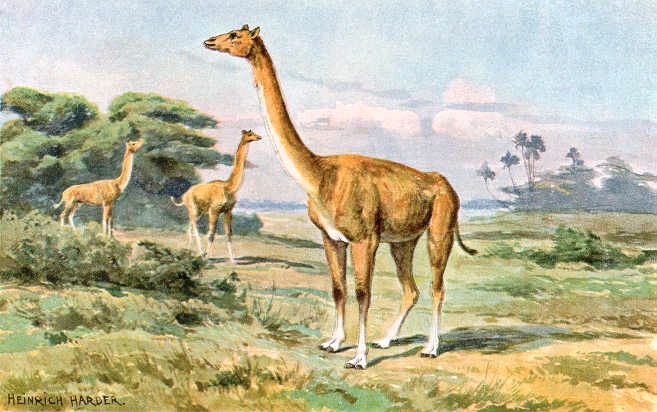
- Life restoration of the Miocene camel Aepycamelus, or the long-necked camel. Heinrich Harder (1920).
  †Aepycamelus
- †Aesculus
  - †Aesculus montanus
- Agelaius
  - †Agelaius phoeniceus
- †Agriotherium
  - †Agriotherium schneideri – or unidentified comparable form
- †Alforjas – tentative report
- †Alilepus
  - †Alilepus vagus – type locality for species
- Alnus
  - †Alnus carpinoides
  - †Alnus fairii
  - †Alnus fossilis
  - †Alnus hollandiana
  - †Alnus latahensis
  - †Alnus lemhiensis – type locality for species
  - †Alnus relatus
  - †Alnus rossi
- †Alphagaulus
  - †Alphagaulus pristinus
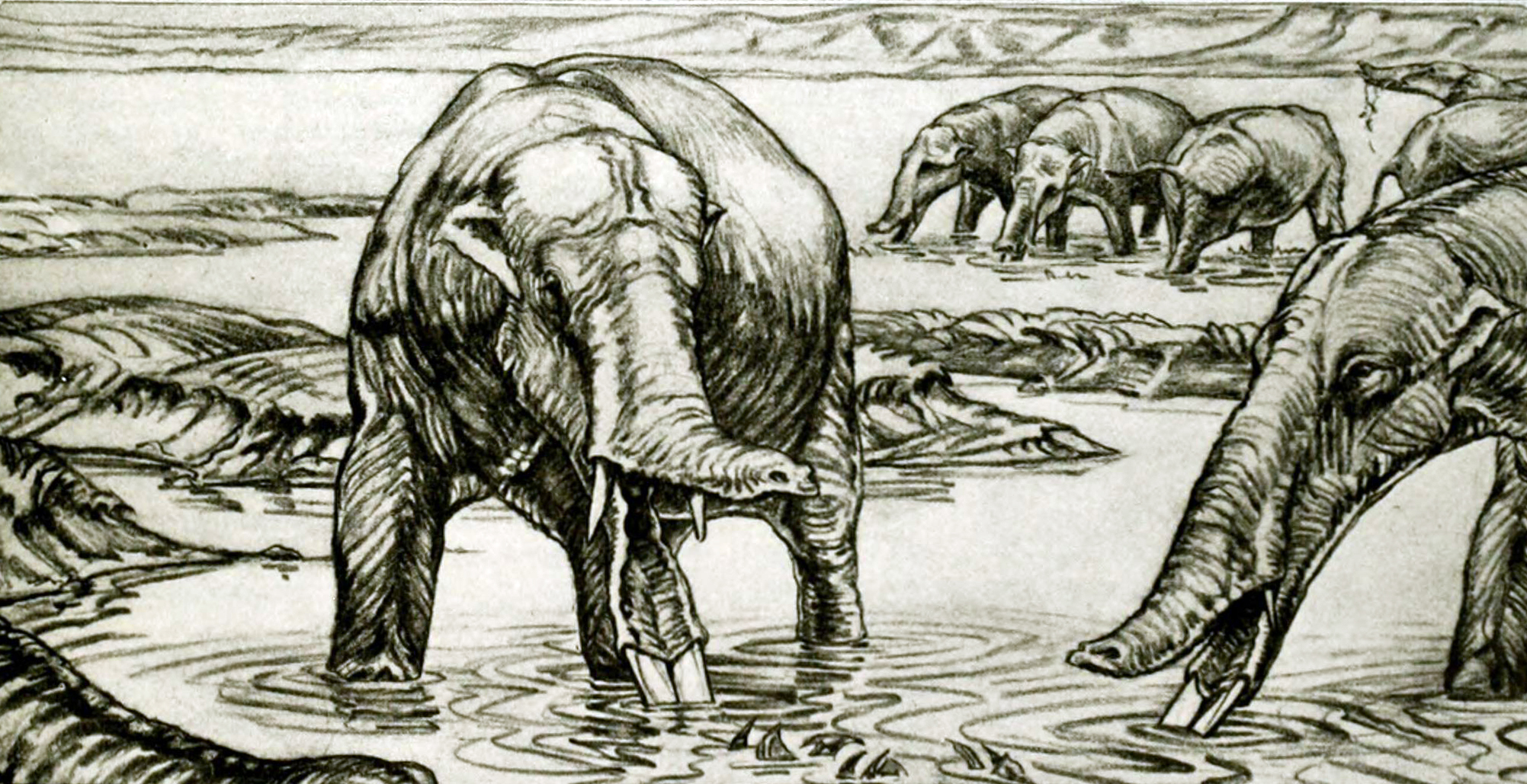
- Life restoration of the Miocene elephant relative Amebelodon. Margret Flinsch (1932).
  †Amebelodon
  - †Amebelodon floridanus – or unidentified comparable form
- Amelanchier
  - †Amelanchier couleeana
  - †Amelanchier dignatus
- Anas
  - †Anas platyrhynchos
- Anser
  - †Anser caerulescens
- Antilocapra
  - †Antilocapra americana
- Antrozous
  - †Antrozous pallidus
- †Aphelops
  - †Aphelops malacorhinus – or unidentified comparable form
- †Archaeohippus
  - †Archaeohippus ultimus
- †Arctodus
  - †Arctodus simus
- Ardea
  - †Ardea herodias

== B ==
- Baiomys
  - †Baiomys aquilonius – type locality for species
- Betula
  - †Betula ashleyi
  - †Betula lemhiensis – type locality for species
  - †Betula thor
  - †Betula vera
- Bibio
  - †Bibio latahensis – type locality for species
  - †Bibio testeus – type locality for species
- Bison
  - †Bison alaskensis
  - †Bison antiquus – or unidentified comparable form
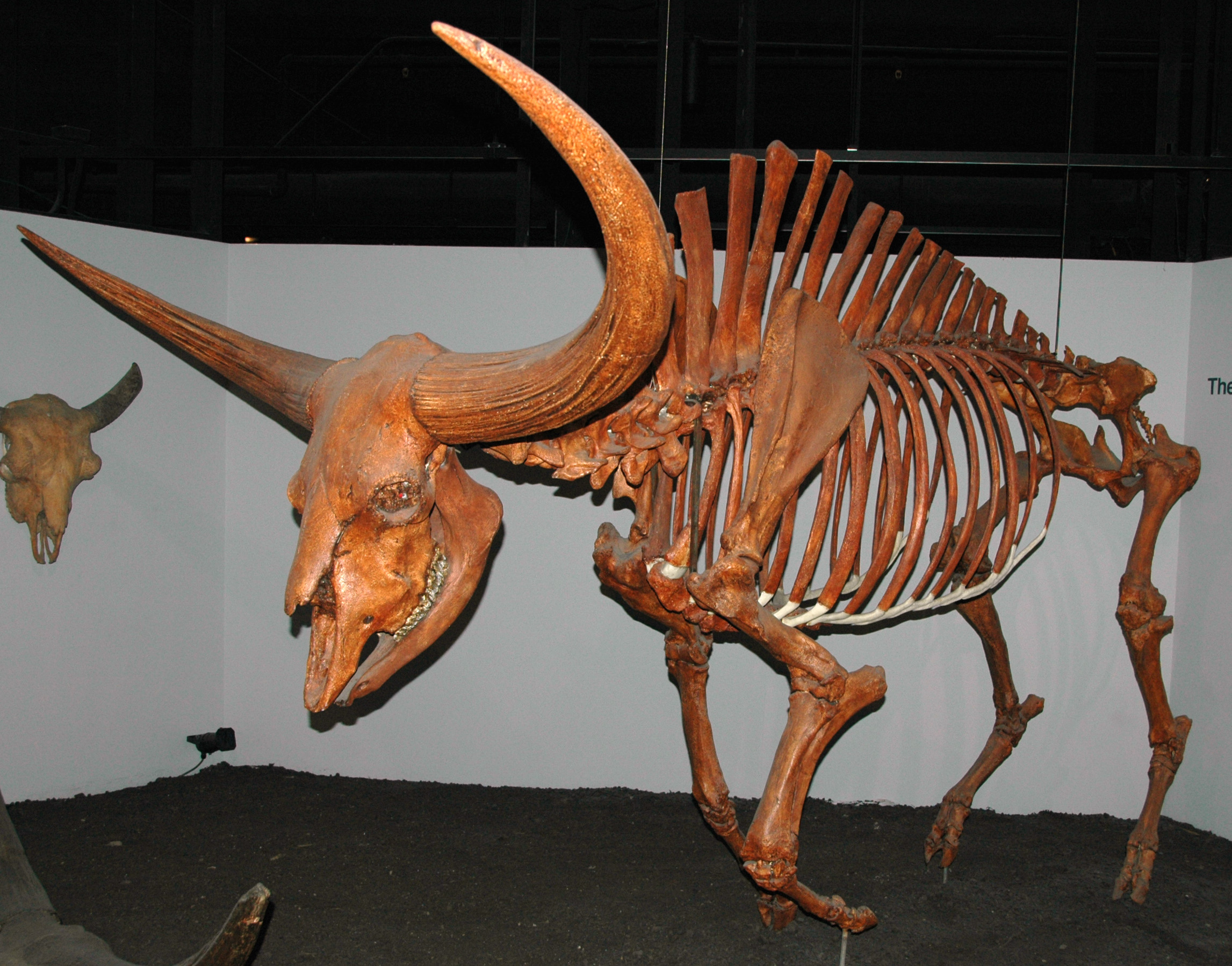
  - Mounted fossilized skeleton of the Pleistocene Bison latifrons, also known as the giant bison or long-horned bison
    †Bison latifrons
  - †Bison priscus
- Boletina
- †Bolitophila
  - †Bolitophila pulveris – type locality for species
- †Bombus
  - †Bombus proavus – tentative report
- Bonasa
  - †Bonasa umbellus
- †Bootherium
  - †Bootherium bombifrons
- †Borophagus
  - †Borophagus diversidens
  - †Borophagus hilli
  - †Borophagus pugnator
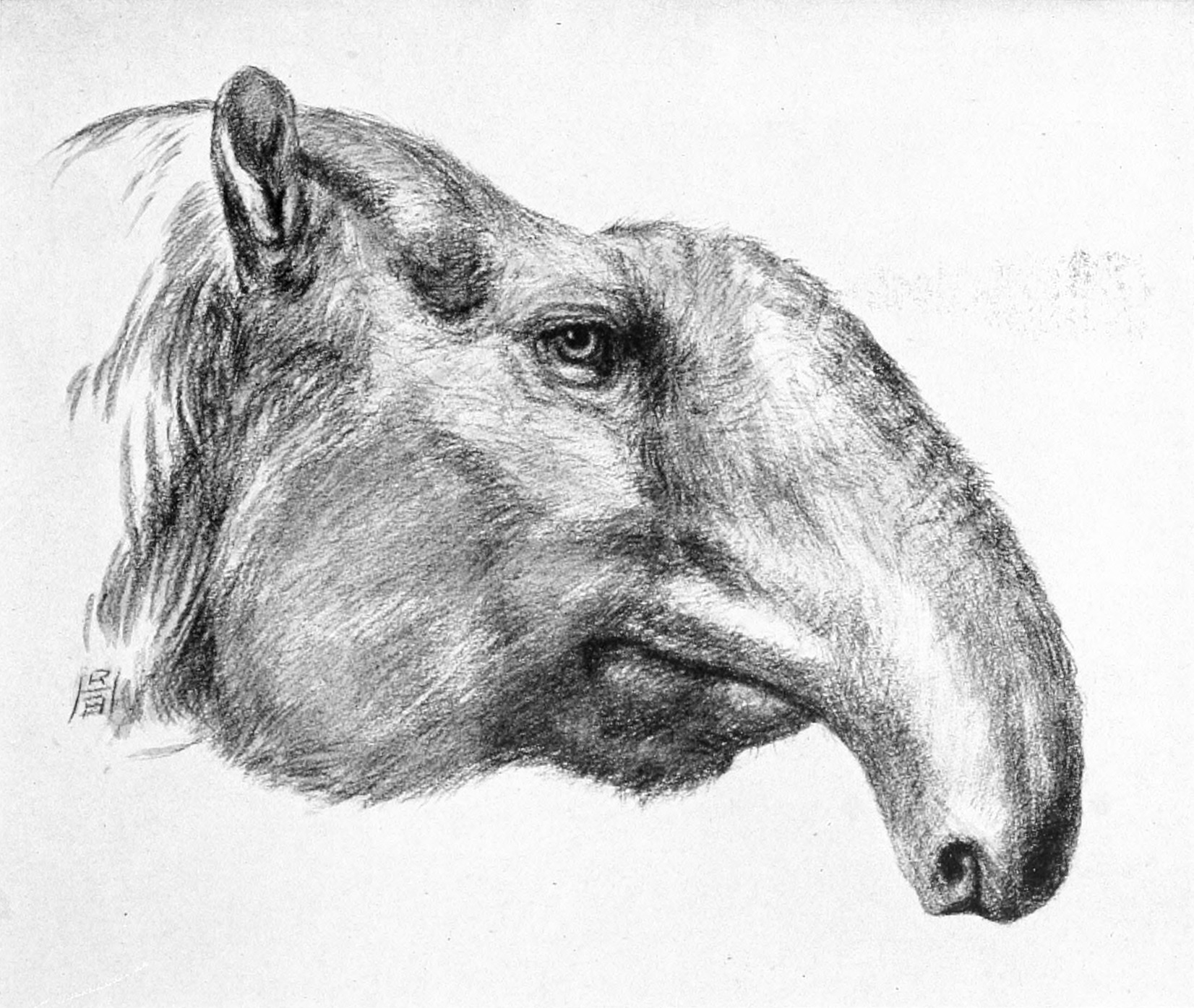
- Restorative portrait of the Miocene oreodont mammal Brachycrus
  †Brachycrus
- Brachylagus
  - †Brachylagus idahoensis
- Branta
  - †Branta canadensis
- Bucephala
- †Buisnictis
  - †Buisnictis breviramus

== C ==
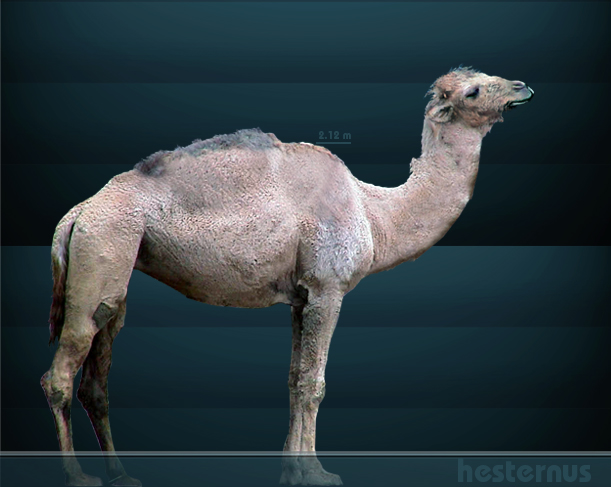
- Life restoration of the Pliocene-Holocene camel Camelops
  †Camelops
  - †Camelops hesternus
- Camponotus
- Canis
  - †Canis dirus
  - †Canis ferox
  - †Canis latrans
  - †Canis lepophagus
- Carya
  - †Carya benderei
  - †Carya bendrerei
  - †Carya libbeyi
- Castor
  - †Castor californicus
  - †Castor canadensis
- Ceanothus
  - †Ceanothus chaneyi
- Cedrela
  - †Cedrela pteraformis
- †Ceratomeryx – type locality for genus
  - †Ceratomeryx prenticei – type locality for species
- Cercidiphyllum
  - †Cercidiphyllum crenatum
  - †Cercidiphyllum elongatum
- Cervus
  - †Cervus elaphus – or unidentified comparable form
- †Chamaecyparis
  - †Chamaecyparis edwardsii – type locality for species
  - †Chamaecyparis linguaefolia
- Chen
  - †Chen pressa – type locality for species
- †Chrysolepis
  - †Chrysolepis haynesii – type locality for species
- Ciconia – tentative report
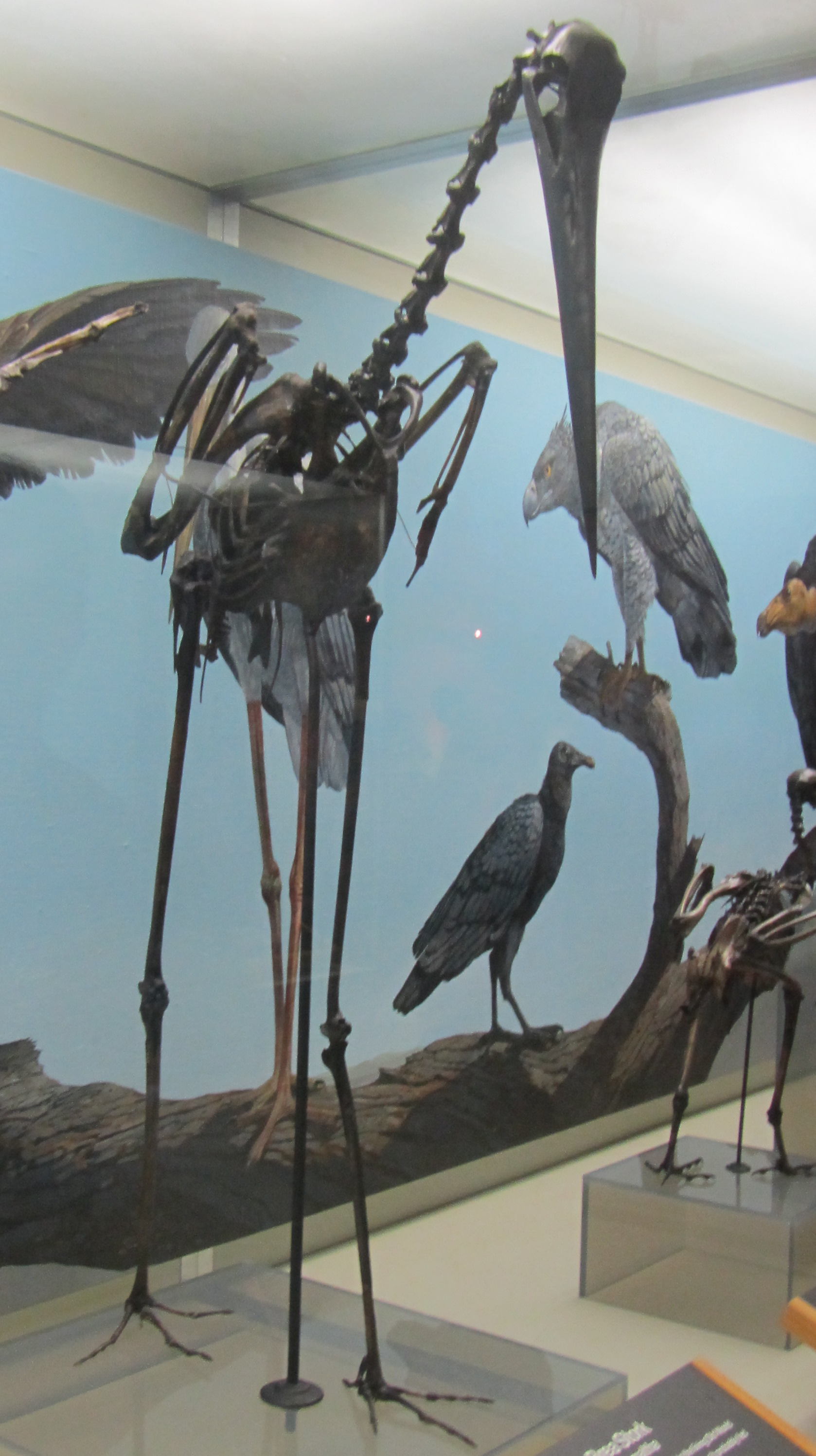
  - Mounted fossilized skeleton of the Pliocene-Pleistocene Ciconia maltha, also known as the asphalt stork or La Brea stork
    †Ciconia maltha
- Colymbus
- Comptonia
  - †Comptonia hesperia
- †Conites – tentative report
- †Copemys – tentative report
- Cornus
  - †Cornus ovalis
- †Cosomys
  - †Cosomys primus
- †Cosoryx
- Craigia
  - †Craigia oregonensis
- Crataegus
  - †Crataegus bakeri – type locality for species
  - †Crataegus flavescens
  - †Crataegus haynesii – type locality for species
- †Cunninghamia
  - †Cunninghamia marquettii – type locality for species
- Cygnus
  - †Cygnus hibbardi – type locality for species
- Cynomys
  - †Cynomys niobrarius
- †Cynorca

== D ==
- †Dennstaedtia
  - †Dennstaedtia americana
- †Diceratherium
  - †Diceratherium niobrarense
- †Diplodipelta
  - †Diplodipelta reniptera
- †Dipoides
  - †Dipoides stirtoni
- Dolichoderus
- †Domnina
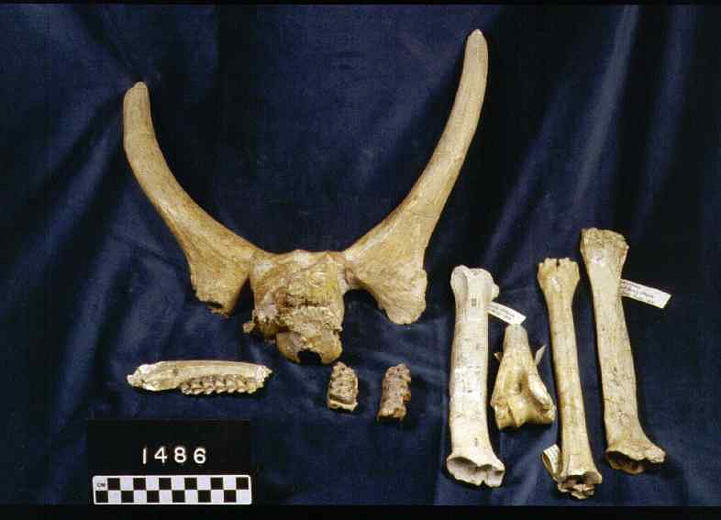
- Fossilized horns, jaws, and limb bones of the Miocene deer relative Dromomeryx
  †Dromomeryx
- Dytiscus
  - †Dytiscus miocenicus – type locality for species

== E ==
- Elaphe
  - †Elaphe pliocenica – type locality for species
  - †Elaphe vulpina
- †Entoptychus
  - †Entoptychus fieldsi
  - †Entoptychus sheppardi
- †Eotermes
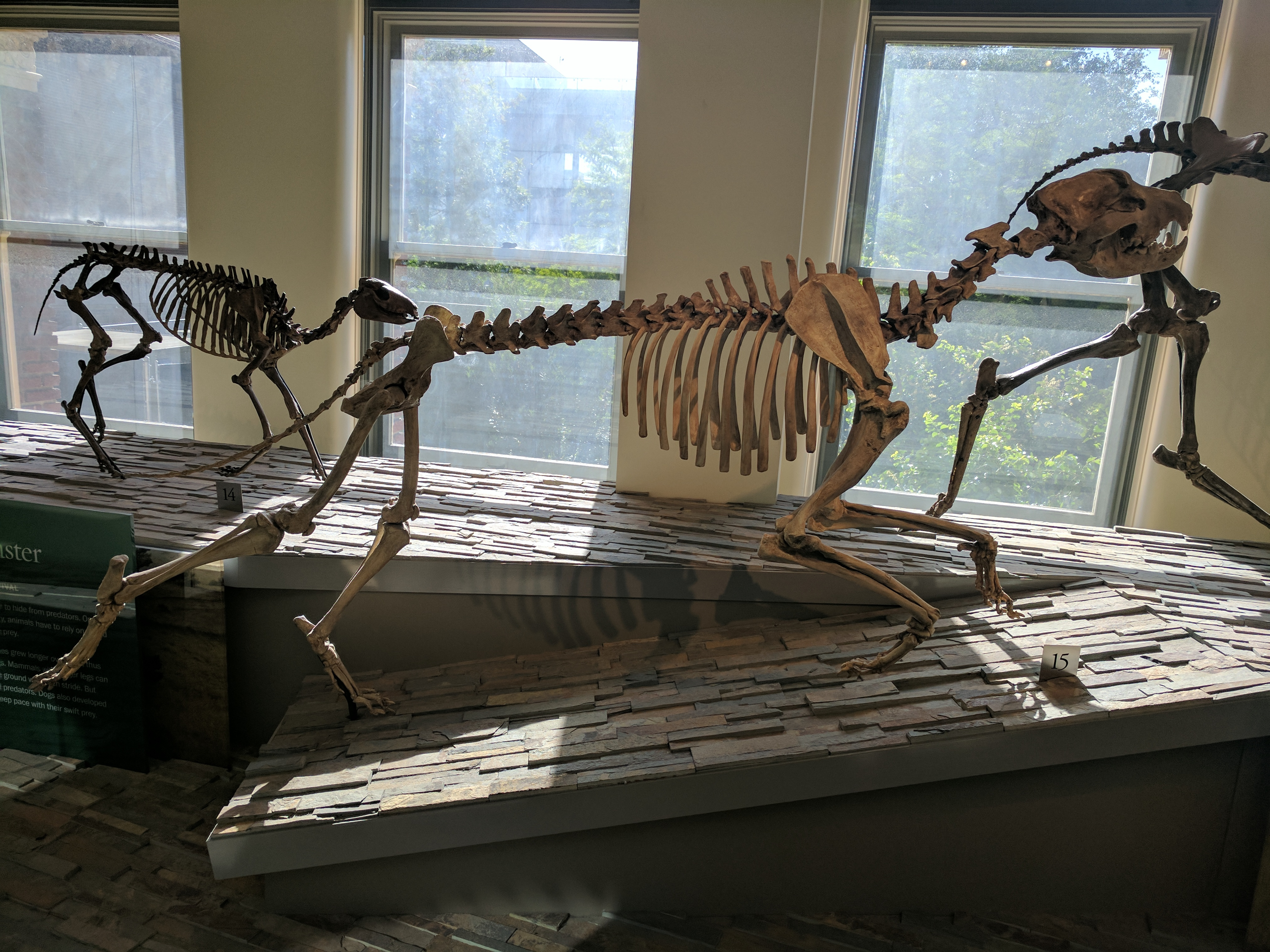
- Mounted fossilized skeleton of the Miocene bone-crushing dog Epicyon
  †Epicyon
  - †Epicyon haydeni
- †Equisetum
  - †Equisetum alexanderi
  - †Equisetum arcticum – or unidentified comparable form
  - †Equisetum octangulatum
- Equus
  - †Equus fromanius
  - †Equus idahoensis
  - †Equus scotti
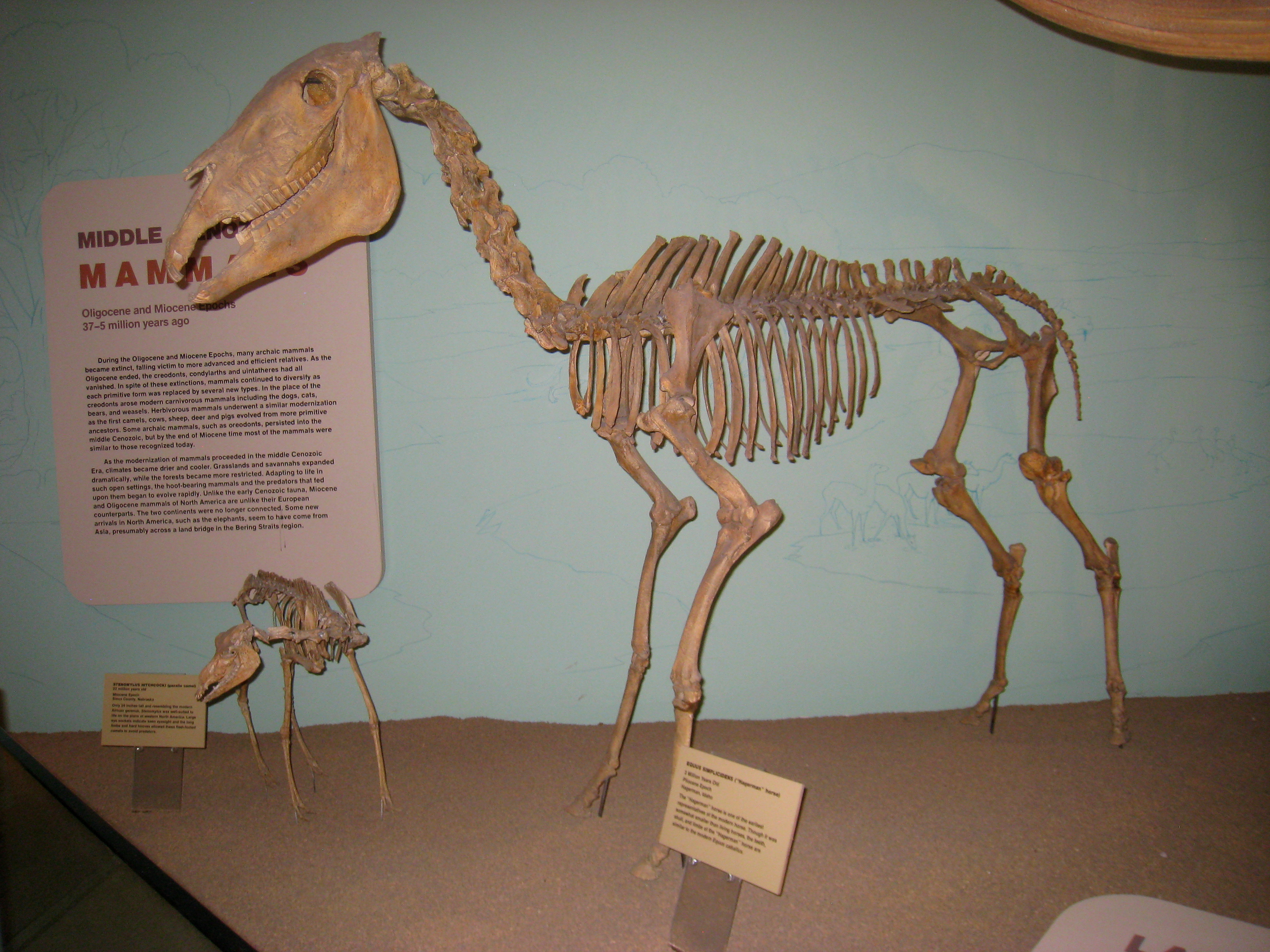
  - Fossilized skeleton of the Pliocene-Pleistocene horse Equus simplicidens, also known as the Hagerman horse or American zebra
    †Equus simplicidens
- Erethizon
  - †Erethizon bathygnathum
  - †Erethizon dorsatum
- †Eucommia
  - †Eucommia serrata
- †Euptelea
  - †Euptelea dilcherii – type locality for species
- Exechia
  - †Exechia juliaetta – type locality for species

== F ==
- Falco
  - †Falco peregrinus
- Felis
  - †Felis lacustris
  - †Felis rexroadensis
- †Ferinestrix
  - †Ferinestrix vorax – type locality for species
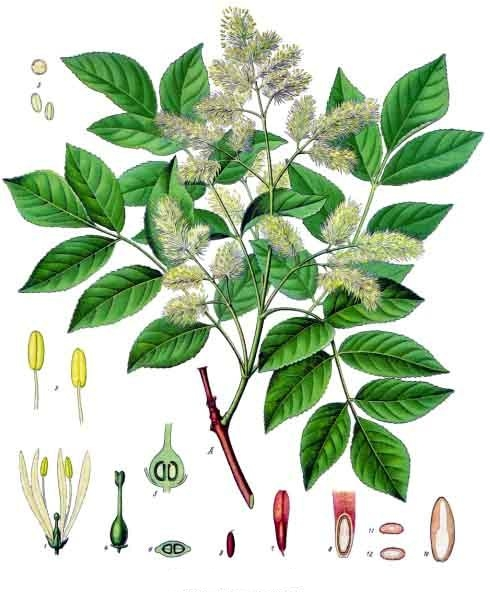
- Illustrations of the flowers and foliage of a living Fraxinus, or ash tree, with insets further detailing its anatomy
  †Fraxinus
  - †Fraxinus coulteri
  - †Fraxinus stenocarpa – type locality for species

== G ==
- Gallinula
  - †Gallinula chloropus
- †Garrya
  - †Garrya idahoensis
- †Gigantocamelus
  - †Gigantocamelus spatulus
- Ginkgo
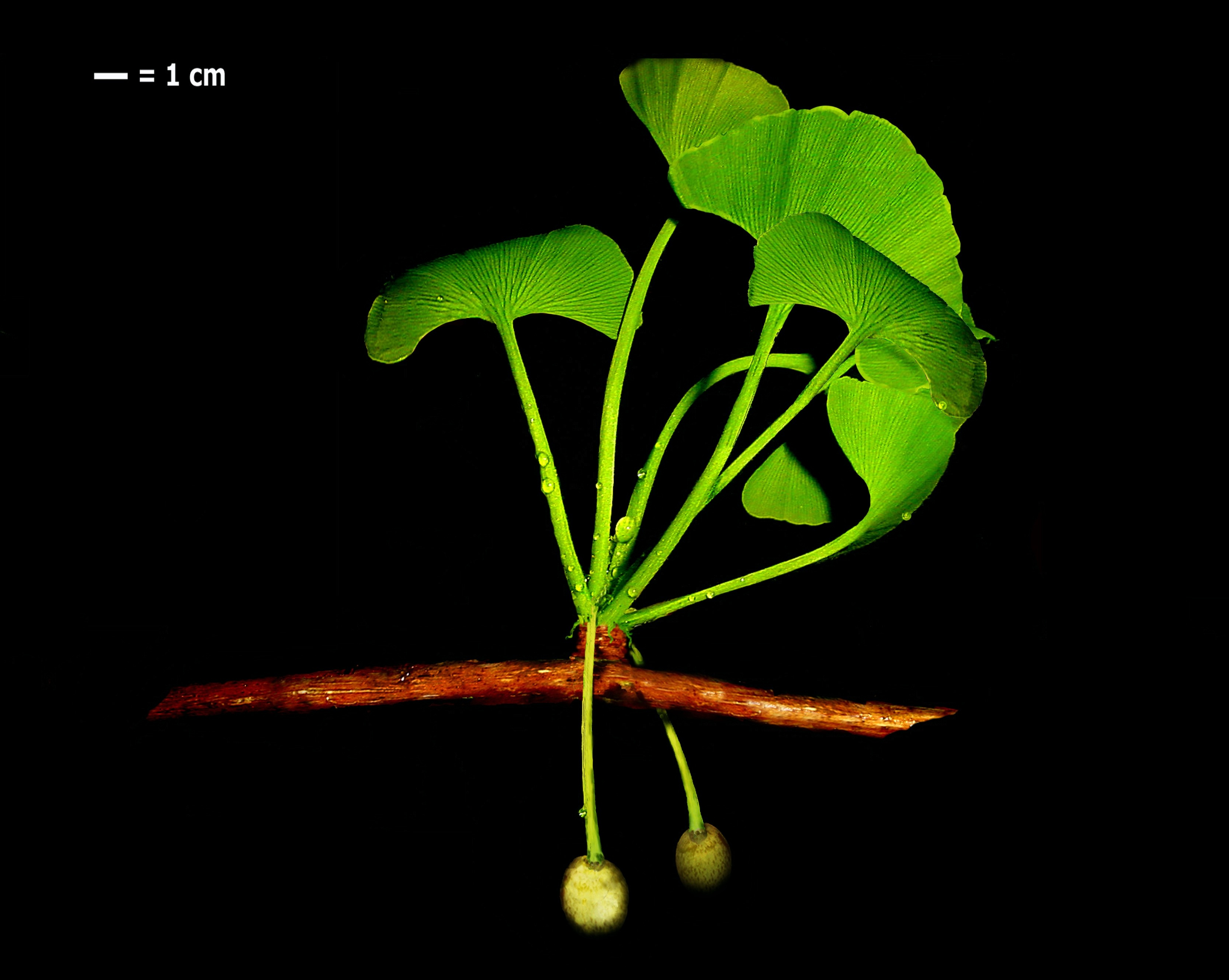
  - Restored foliage of the Late Cretaceous-Miocene ginkgo tree Ginkgo adiantoides
    †Ginkgo adiantoides
- †Gleditsia
  - †Gleditsia lottii – type locality for species

== H ==
- Halesia
  - †Halesia columbiana
- †Hemiauchenia
  - †Hemiauchenia macrocephala
- Homo
  - †Homo sapiens
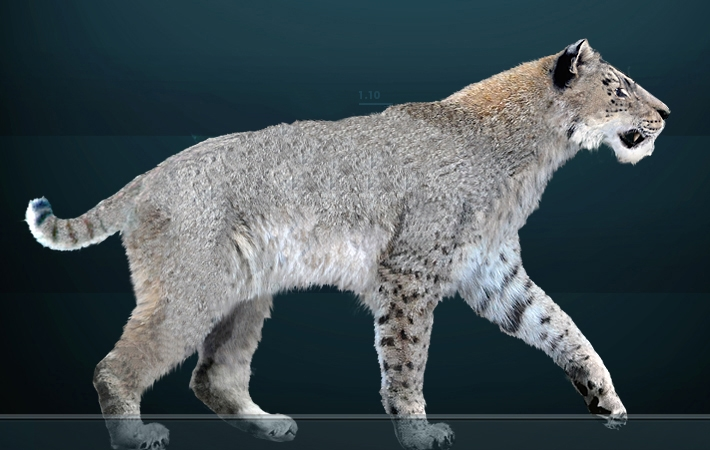
- Restoration of Pliocene-Pleistocene Homotherium, or scimitar cat
  †Homotherium
  - †Homotherium idahoensis
  - †Homotherium serum
- Hydrangea
  - †Hydrangea bendirei
- †Hypohippus
- †Hypolagus
  - †Hypolagus edensis
  - †Hypolagus furlongi
  - †Hypolagus gidleyi
  - †Hypolagus vetus
  - †Hypolagus voorhiesi

== I ==
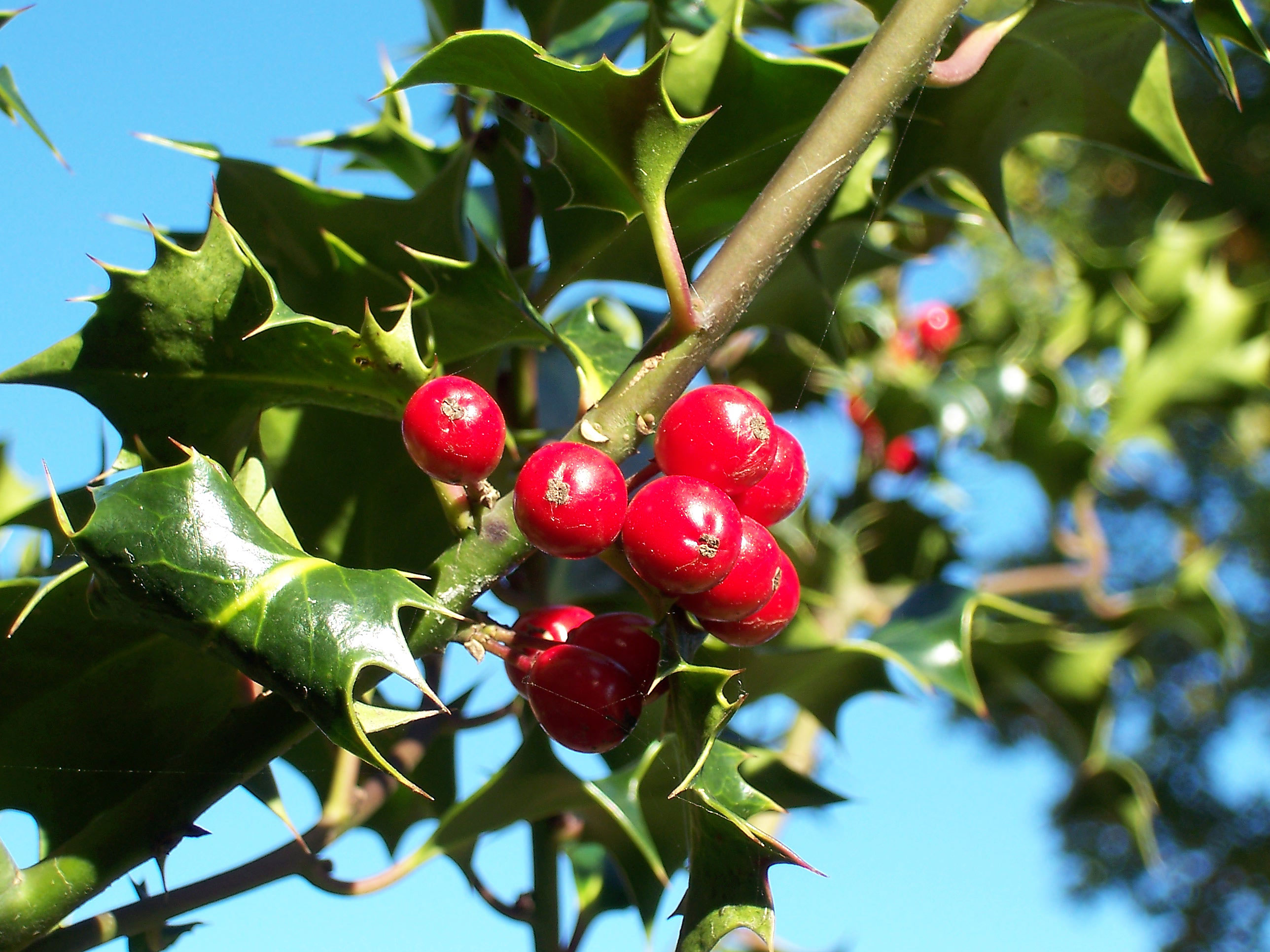
- Foliage and fruit of a living Ilex, or holly
  Ilex
  - †Ilex idahoensis

== J ==
- Juglans
  - †Juglans browniana

== L ==
- Larix
  - †Larix cassiana
  - †Larix lemhiensis – type locality for species
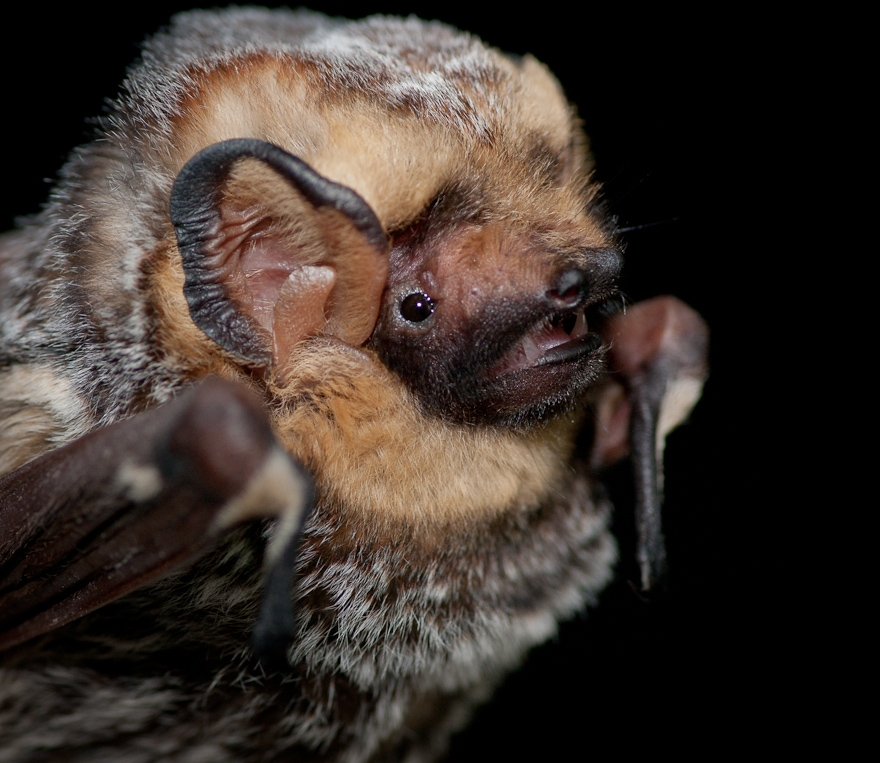
- A living Lasiurus, or hairy-tailed bat
  Lasiurus
  - †Lasiurus fossilis
- Lasius
- †Ledum
  - †Ledum idahoensis – type locality for species
- Lepus
- Libocedrus
  - †Libocedrus masoni
- †Limnephilus
- †Liriodendron
  - †Liriodendron hesperia
- †Lithocarpus
  - †Lithocarpus weidei
- Lontra
  - †Lontra canadensis
  - †Lontra weiri – type locality for species
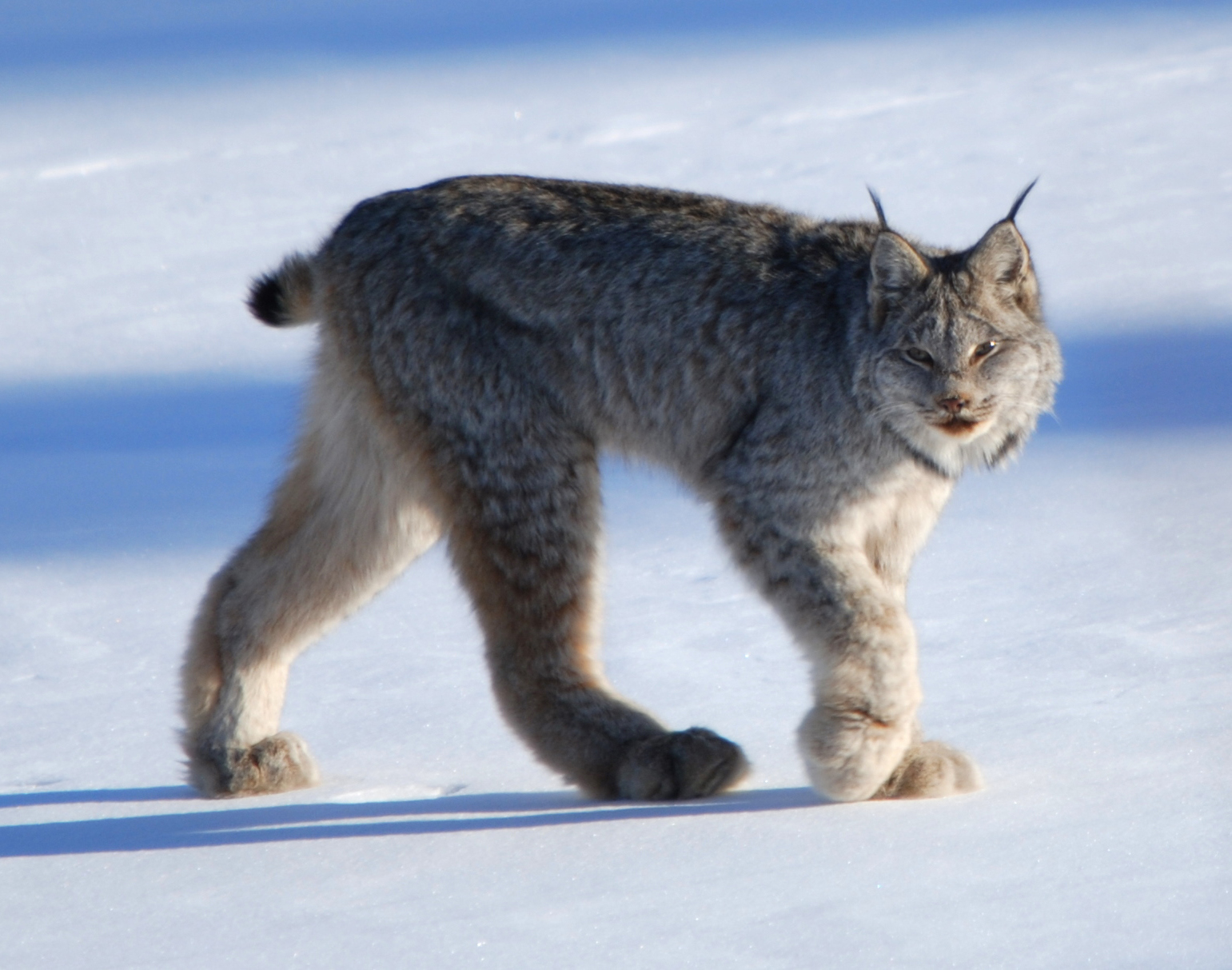
- A living Lynx
  Lynx
  - †Lynx canadensis
  - †Lynx rufus

== M ==
- †Macrophya
  - †Macrophya adventitia – type locality for species
- Mahonia
  - †Mahonia creedensis
  - †Mahonia reticulata
  - †Mahonia simplex
- †Mammut
  - †Mammut americanum
- †Mammuthus
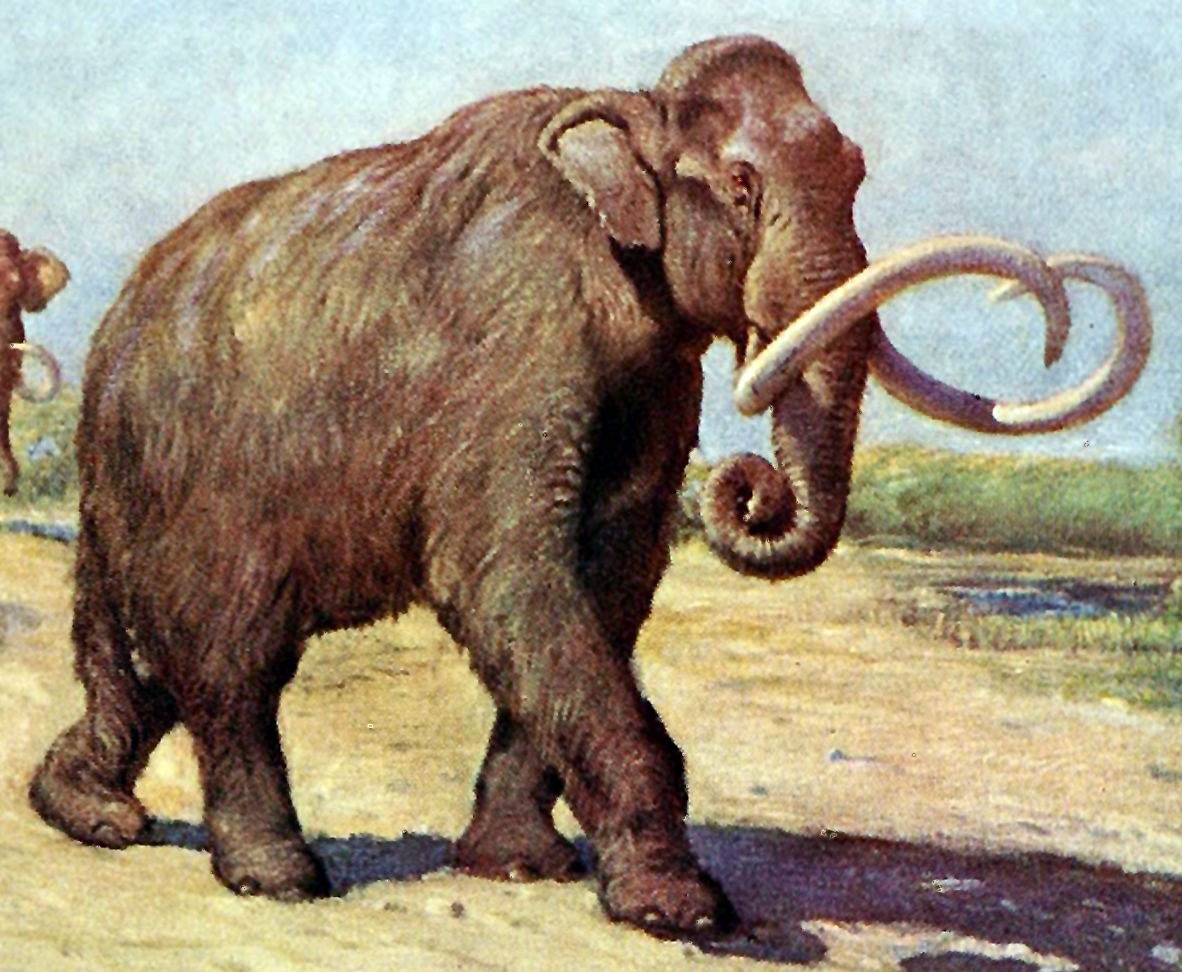
  - Life restoration of a herd of Mammuthus columbi, or Columbian mammoths. The extent of the fur depicted is hypothetical. Charles R. Knight (1909).
    †Mammuthus columbi
  - †Mammuthus hayi
- †Martinogale
- †Megacamelus
- †Megaleuctra
  - †Megaleuctra jewetti – type locality for species
- †Megalonyx
  - †Megalonyx jeffersonii
  - †Megalonyx leptostomus
- †Megantereon
  - †Megantereon hesperus
- Meleagris
  - †Meleagris gallopavo
- Mergus
  - †Mergus merganser
- †Merychyus
  - †Merychyus elegans
  - †Merychyus smithi
- †Mesoreodon
  - †Mesoreodon chelonyx
- Messor – tentative report
- †Metalopex
  - †Metalopex merriami
- Metasequoia
  - †Metasequoia occidentalis
- †Michenia
- Mictomys
  - †Mictomys vetus
- †Mimomys
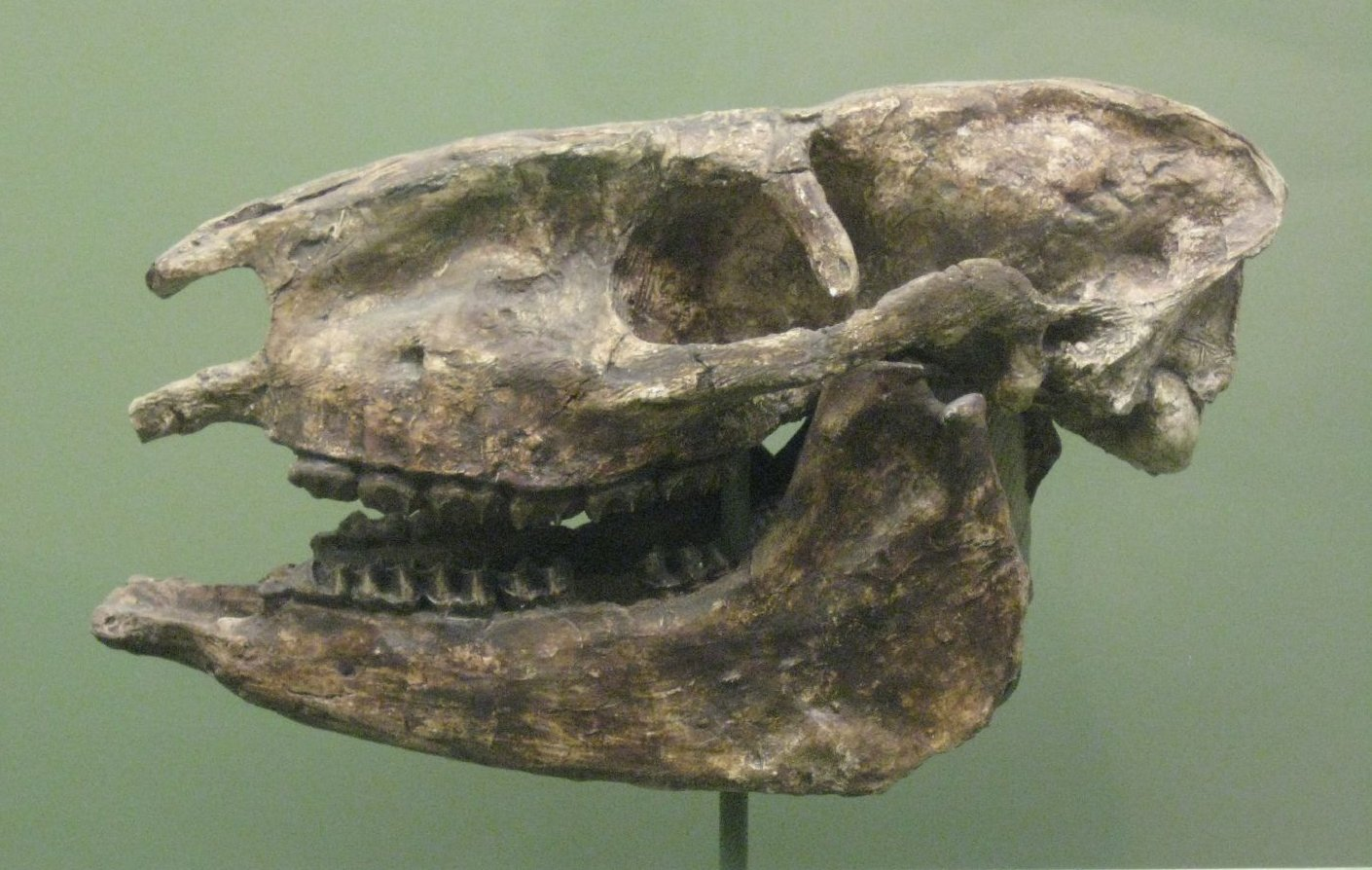
- Fossilized skull of the Eocene-Oligocene three-toed horse Miohippus
  †Miohippus
  - †Miohippus gemmarosae – or unidentified comparable form
- †Miolabis – tentative report
- †Miopsyche
- Mustela
  - †Mustela rexroadensis

== N ==
- Natrix
  - †Natrix hibbardi – type locality for species
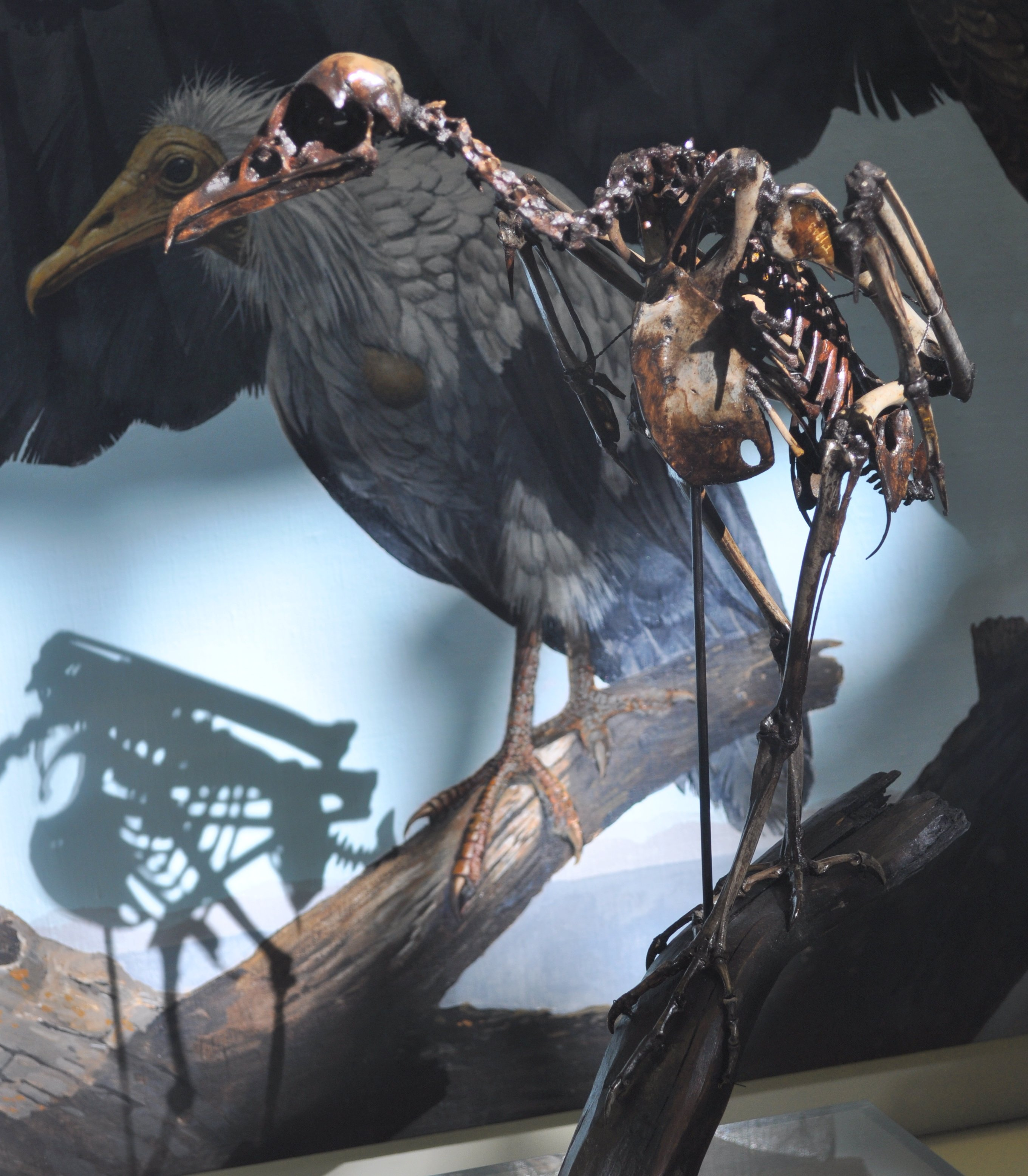
- Mounted fossilized skeleton of the Miocene Neophrontops
  Neophrontops
  - †Neophrontops slaughteri – type locality for species
- Neotoma
  - †Neotoma quadriplicata – or unidentified comparable form
- †Neotragocerus
  - †Neotragocerus lindgreni – type locality for species
- †Niglarodon
  - †Niglarodon petersonensis
  - †Niglarodon yeariani
- †Nymphaeites
  - †Nymphaeites nevadensis
- †Nyssa
  - †Nyssa hesperia

== O ==
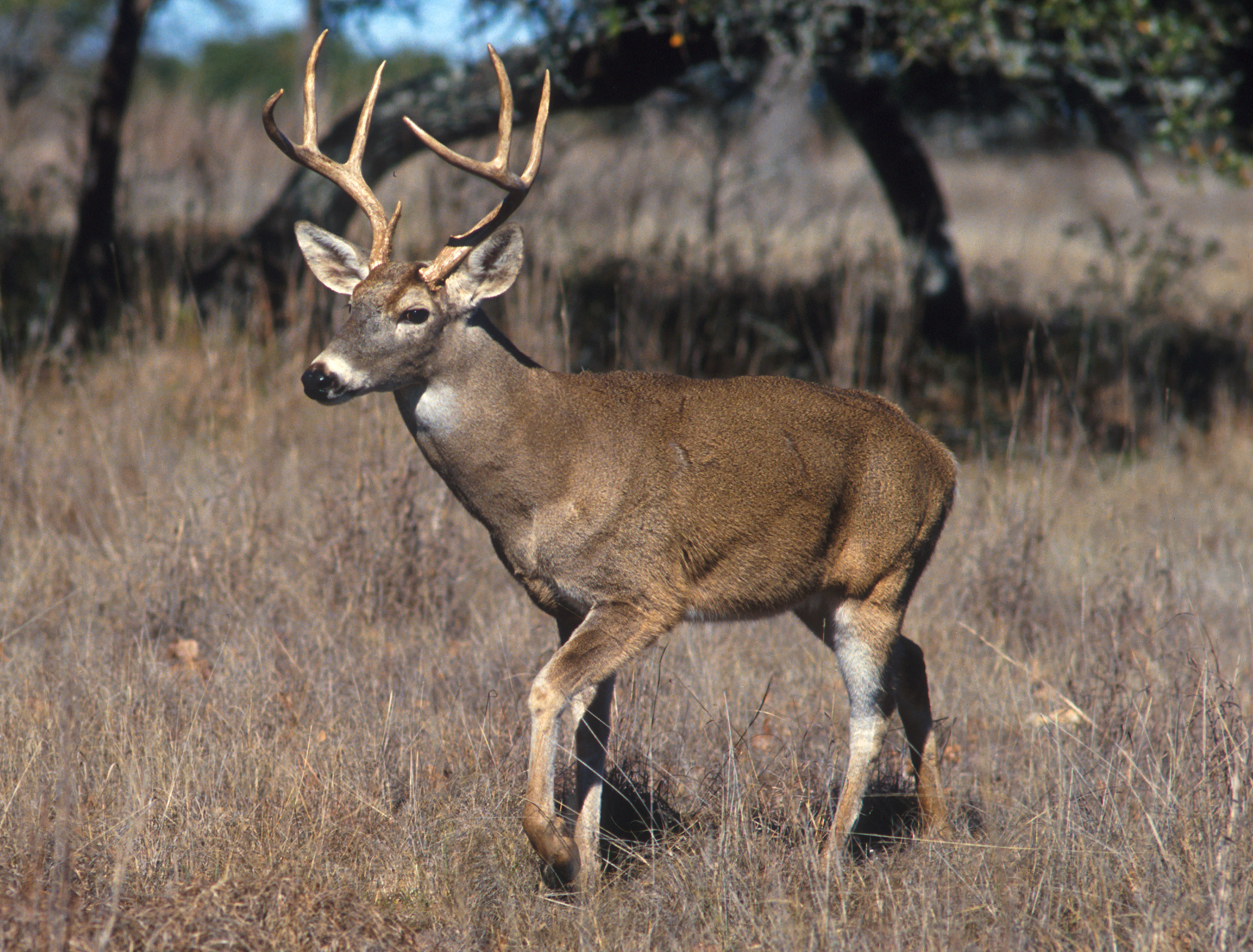
- A living Odocoileus deer
  Odocoileus
- Ondatra
  - †Ondatra idahoensis – type locality for species
  - †Ondatra minor
  - †Ondatra zibethicus
- †Ophiomys
  - †Ophiomys parvus – type locality for species
  - †Ophiomys taylori
- †Oregonomys
  - †Oregonomys magnus
  - †Oregonomys pebblespringsensis – or unidentified comparable form
- †Oreolagus
- †Osmunda
  - †Osmunda occidentale
  - †Osmunda occidentalis
- Ostrya
  - †Ostrya oregoniana
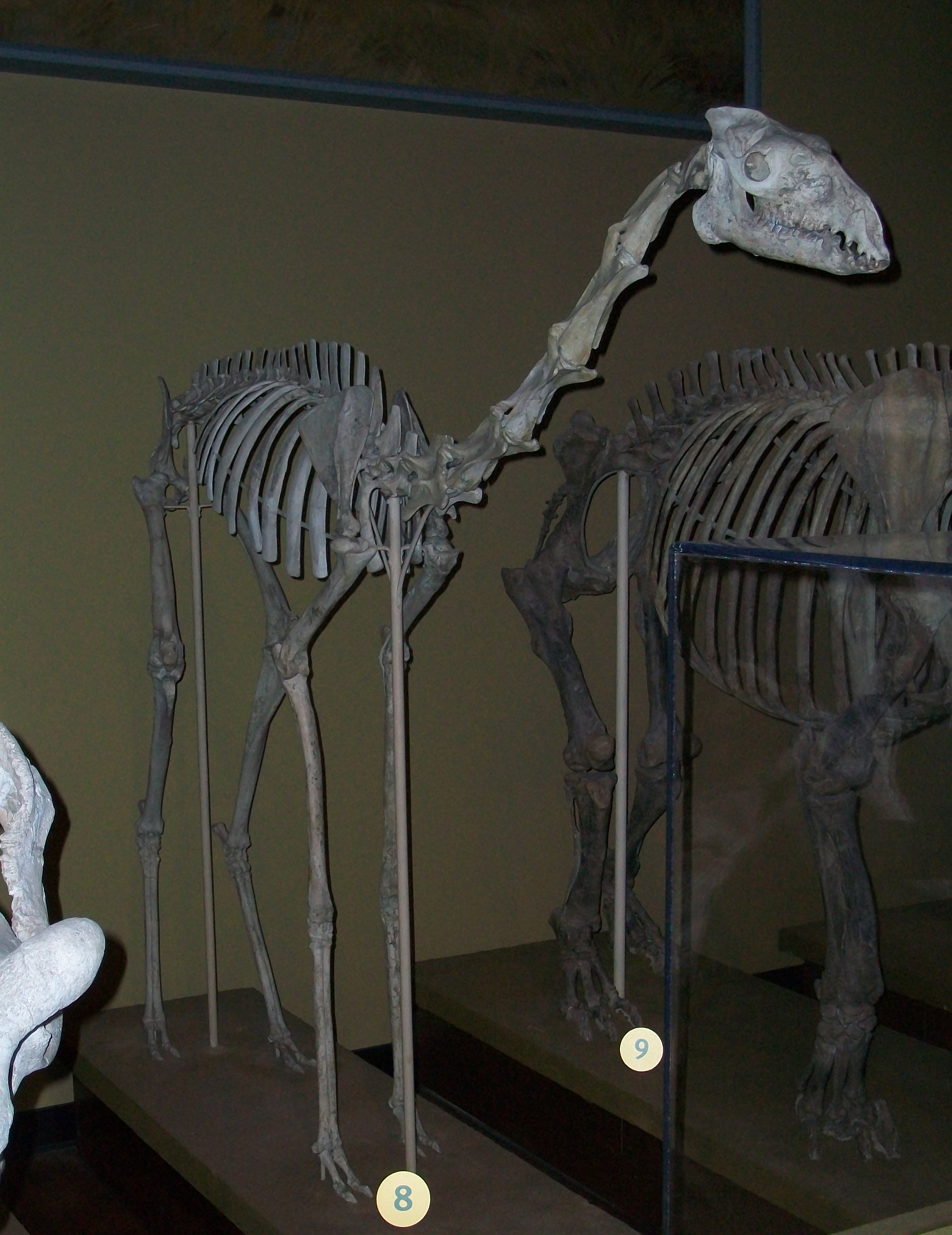
- Mounted fossilized skeleton of the Oligocene-Miocene camel Oxydactylus
  †Oxydactylus

== P ==
- †Paciculus
  - †Paciculus montanus
- †Paenemarmota
  - †Paenemarmota barbouri
  - †Paenemarmota sawrockensis
- †Palaeolagus – tentative report
- Panthera
  - †Panthera leo
- †Paracryptotis
  - †Paracryptotis gidleyi
- †Paramicrotoscoptes
  - †Paramicrotoscoptes hibbardi
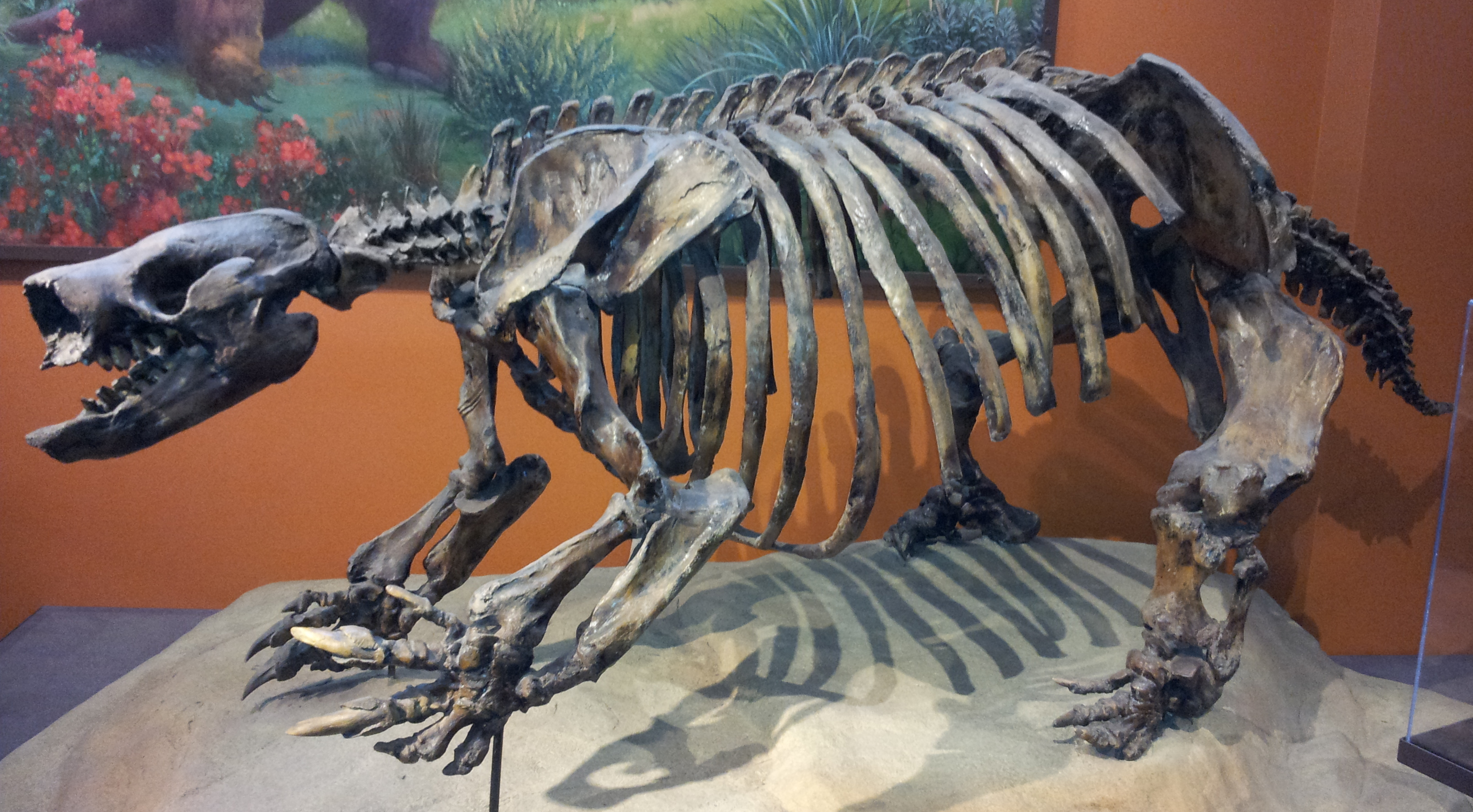
- Fossilized skeleton of the Pliocene-Pleistocene ground sloth Paramylodon
  †Paramylodon
  - †Paramylodon harlani
- †Paratamias – type locality for genus
  - †Paratamias tarassus – type locality for species
- †Parthenocissus
  - †Parthenocissus idahoensis
- Pelecanus
  - †Pelecanus halieus – type locality for species
- Perognathus
  - †Perognathus maldei – type locality for species
- Peromyscus
  - †Peromyscus hagermanensis – type locality for species
- Persea
  - †Persea pseudocarolinensis
- Phalacrocorax
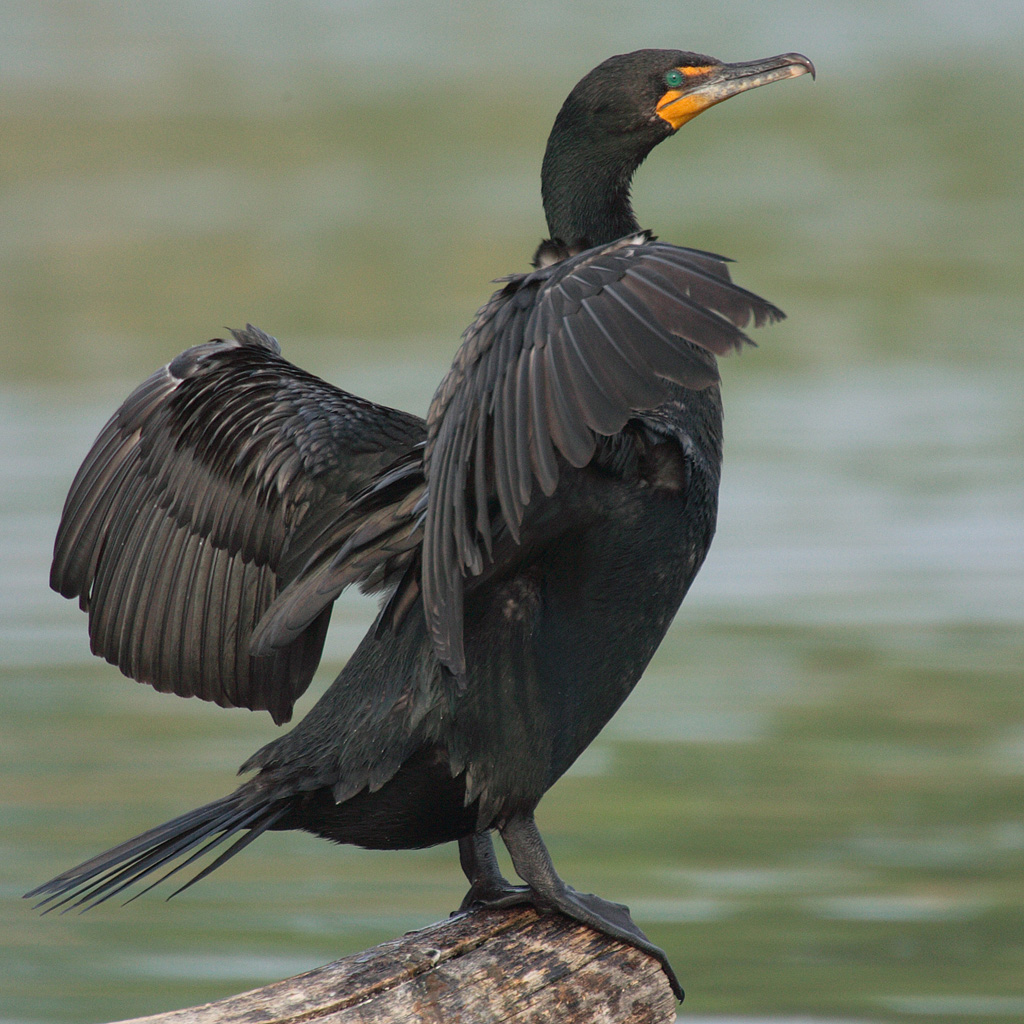
  - A living Phalacrocorax auritus, or double-crested cormorant
    †Phalacrocorax auritus
  - †Phalacrocorax idahensis
  - †Phalacrocorax macer – type locality for species
- Phenacomys
  - †Phenacomys gryci
- Phryganea
- Picea
  - †Picea coloradensis
  - †Picea lahontense
  - †Picea magna
  - †Picea sonomensis
- Pinus
  - †Pinus alvordensis
  - †Pinus baileyii – type locality for species
  - †Pinus harneyana
  - †Pinus ponderosoides
  - †Pinus prestrobus – type locality for species
  - †Pinus wheeleri
- Platanus
  - †Platanus idahoensis – type locality for species
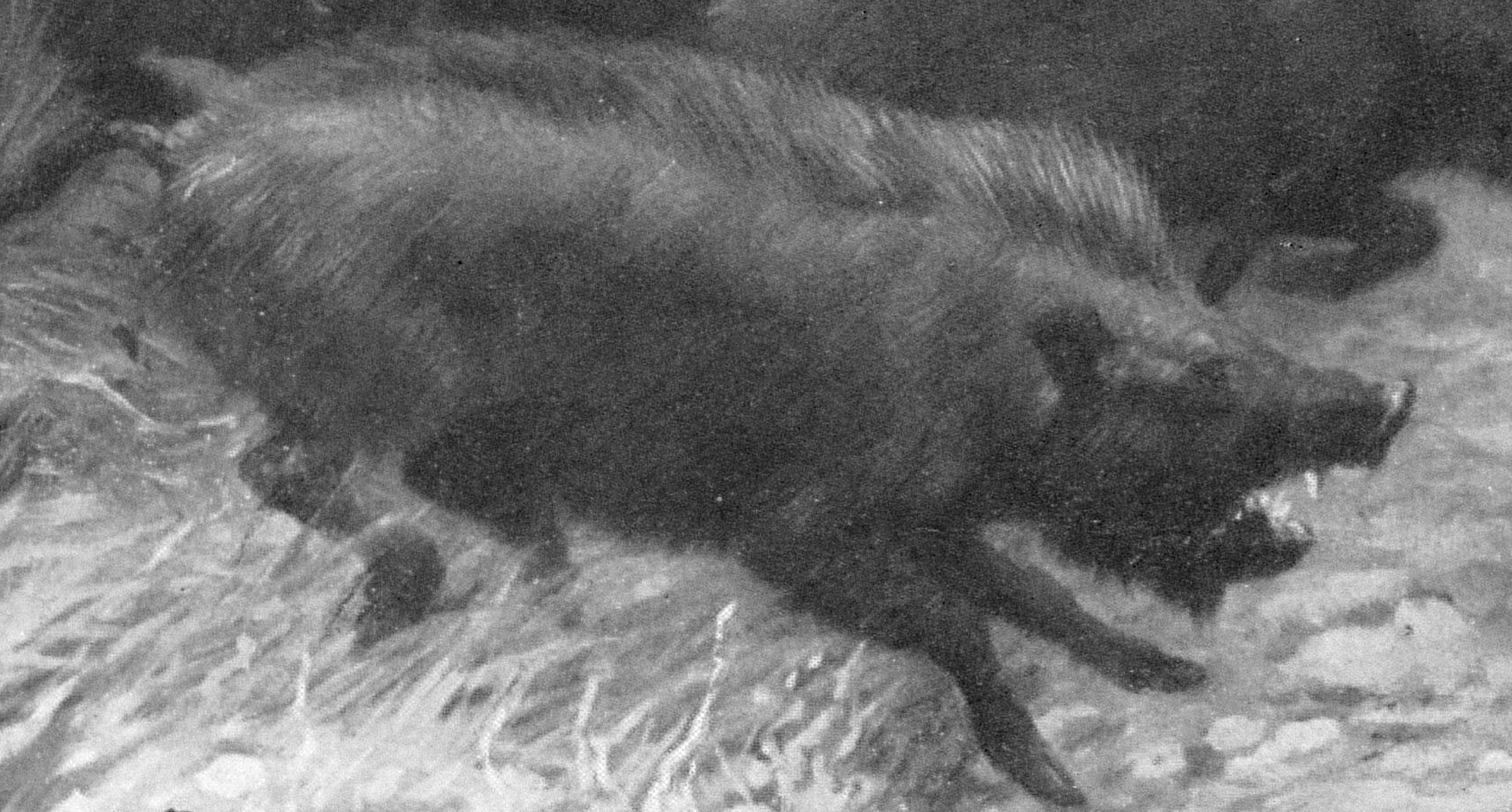
- Restoration of a herd of alarmed Miocene-Pleistocene peccaries of the genus Platygonus. Charles R. Knight (1922).
  †Platygonus
  - †Platygonus pearcei – type locality for species
- †Plesiosorex
  - †Plesiosorex coloradensis – or unidentified comparable form
- †Pliogeomys
  - †Pliogeomys parvus – type locality for species
- †Pliophenacomys
  - †Pliophenacomys meadensis
  - †Pliophenacomys osborni
- †Pliosaccomys
- †Pliotaxidea
  - †Pliotaxidea nevadensis – or unidentified comparable form
- Populus
  - †Populus cinnamonoides
  - †Populus eotremuloides
- Porzana
  - †Porzana lacustris – type locality for species
- †Potamogeton
  - †Potamogeton knowltoni
- †Problastomeryx
  - †Problastomeryx primus
- †Procastoroides
  - †Procastoroides idahoensis
  - †Procastoroides intermedius
- Procyon
  - †Procyon lotor
- †Prodipodomys
  - †Prodipodomys idahoensis – type locality for species
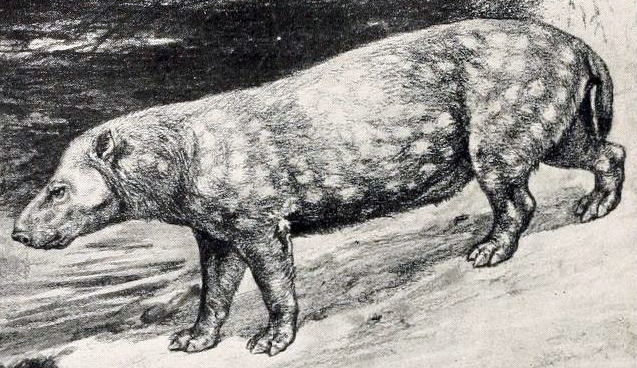
- Restoration of the Miocene hippopotamus-like oreodont Promerycochoerus both onshore and in the water. Robert Bruce Horsfall (1913).
  †Promerycochoerus
  - †Promerycochoerus superbus
- †Propentacora
  - †Propentacora froeschneri – type locality for species
- †Protolabis
- Prunus
  - †Prunus chaneyi
  - †Prunus treasheri
- †Pseudofagus – type locality for genus
  - †Pseudofagus idahoensis – type locality for species
- †Pseudolarix
  - †Pseudolarix americana
  - †Pseudolarix americcana
- †Pseudotsuga
  - †Pseudotsuga glaucoides
  - †Pseudotsuga longifolia
- Pterocarya
  - †Pterocarya mixta
- Puma
  - †Puma concolor

== Q ==
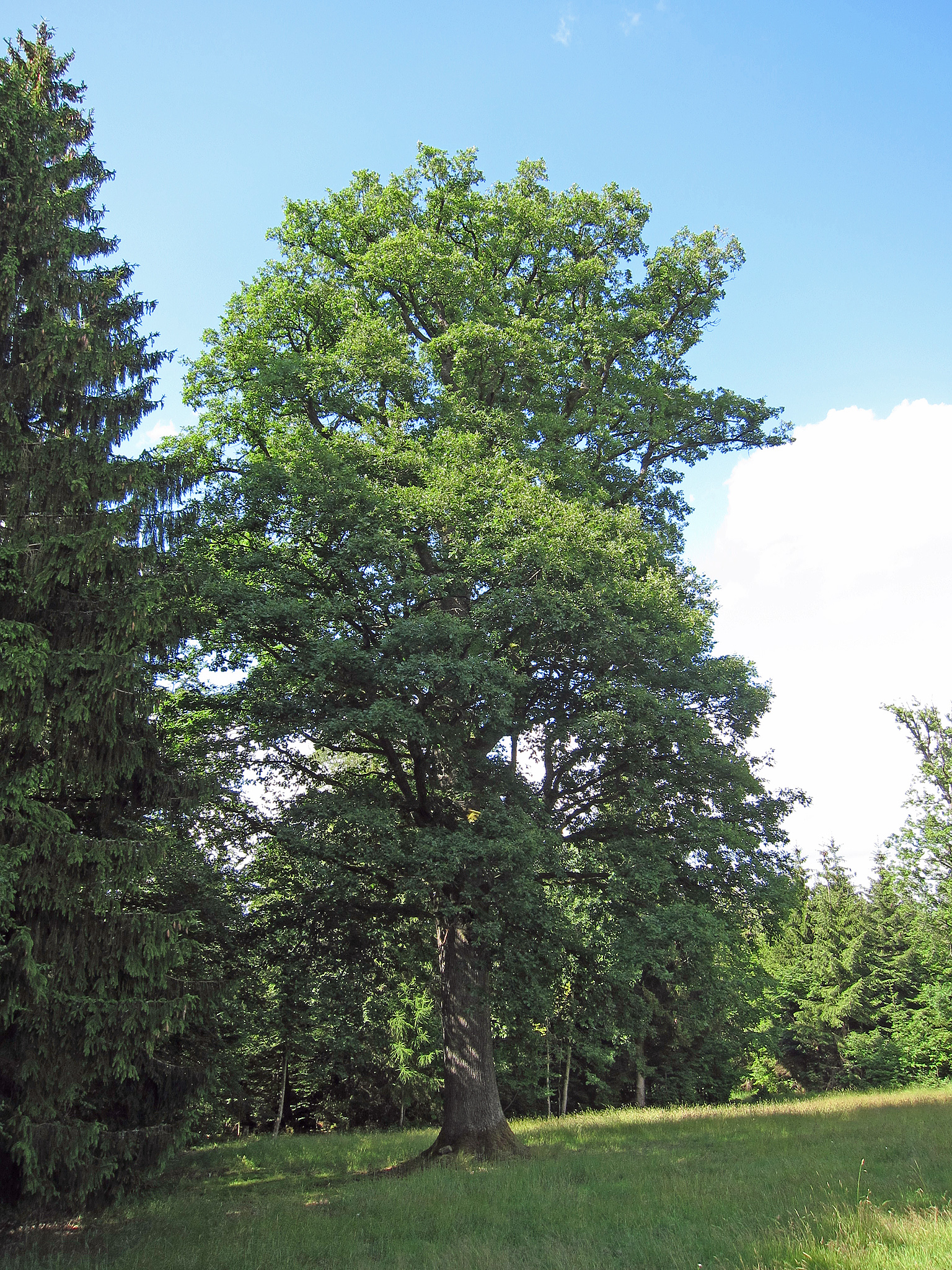
- A living Quercus, or oak tree
  Quercus
  - †Quercus bilobata – type locality for species
  - †Quercus castormontis – type locality for species
  - †Quercus hannibali
  - †Quercus haynesii – type locality for species
  - †Quercus mccanni
  - †Quercus moyei – type locality for species
  - †Quercus simulata
  - †Quercus snookensis – type locality for species
- Querquedula

== R ==
- Rangifer
  - †Rangifer tarandus
- †Rhamnus
  - †Rhamnus columbiana
- Rhododendron
  - †Rhododendron chaneyi
- Rhus
  - †Rhus alvordensis
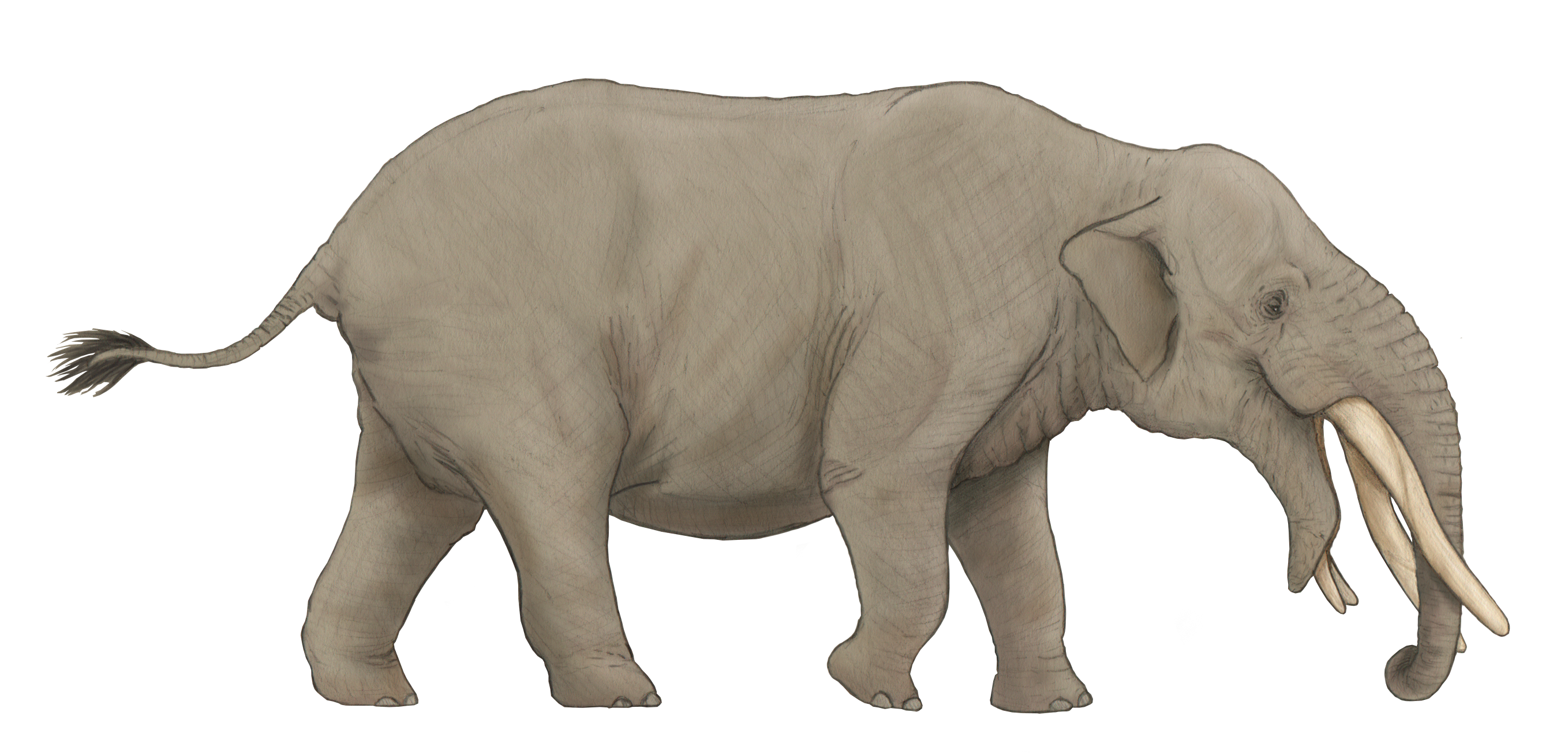
- Restoration of the Miocene-Pliocene elephant relative Rhynchotherium
  †Rhynchotherium
- †Ribes
- Rosa
  - †Rosa germerensis
- †Rymosia
  - †Rymosia miocenica – type locality for species

== S ==
- Salix
  - †Salix cassiana
  - †Salix hesperia
  - †Salix knowltoni
  - †Salix lemhiensis – type locality for species
- Sassafras
  - †Sassafras ashleyi
  - †Sassafras columbiana
- †Satherium
  - †Satherium piscinarium
- Scapanus
  - †Scapanus hagermanensis – type locality for species
  - †Scapanus proceridens – or unidentified comparable form
  - †Scapanus townsendii – or unidentified related form
- Sciara
  - †Sciara sepulta – type locality for species
- Sequoia
  - †Sequoia affinis
- †Sequoiadendron
  - †Sequoiadendron chaneyi
- †Simocyon
  - †Simocyon primigenius – or unidentified comparable form
- †Smilax
  - †Smilax trinervis – or unidentified comparable form
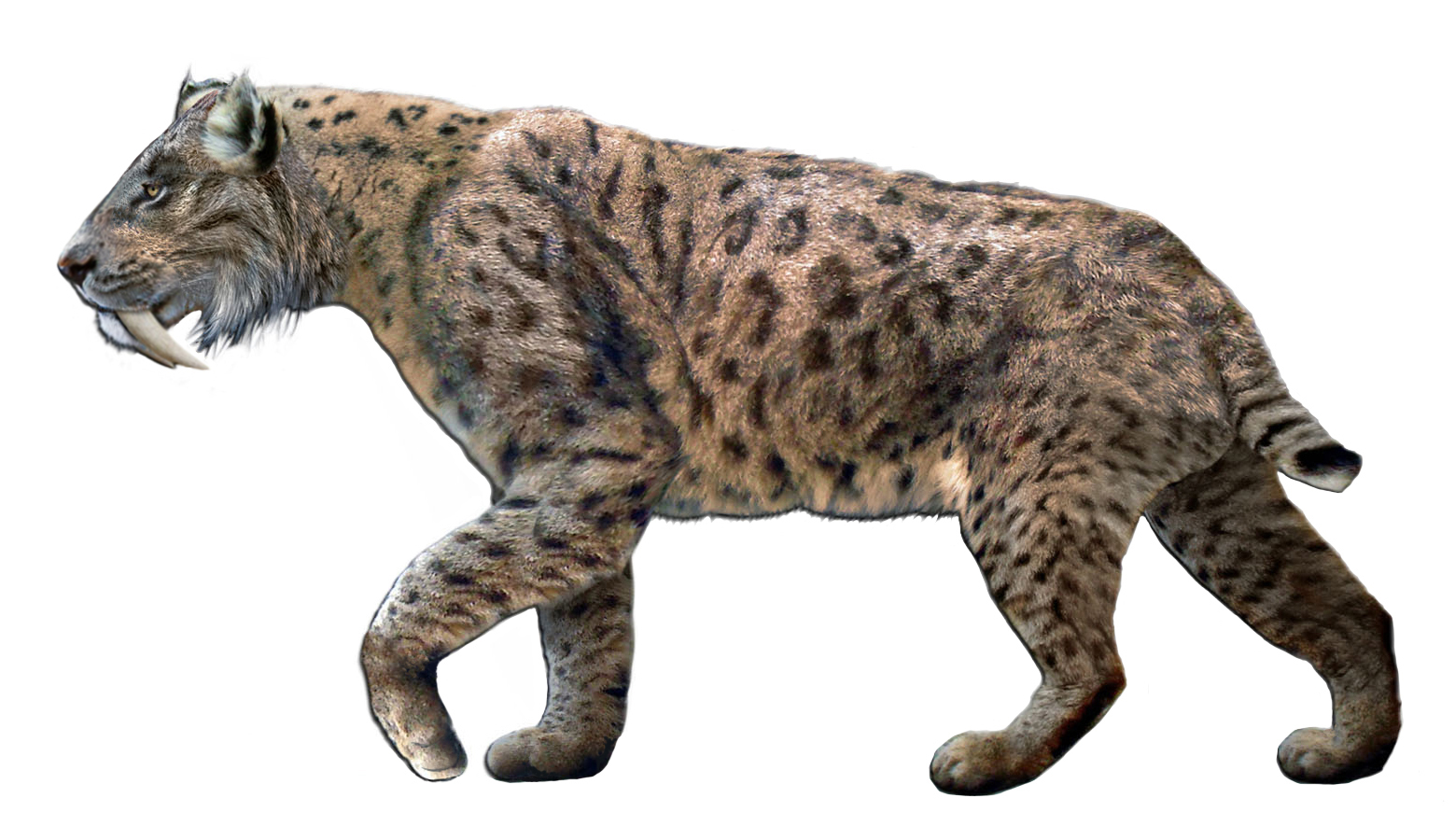
- Life restoration of the Pleistocene-Holocene saber-tooth cat Smilodon
  †Smilodon
  - †Smilodon fatalis
- †Sminthosinis
  - †Sminthosinis bowleri – type locality for species
- †Sophora
  - †Sophora spokanensis
- †Sorbus
  - †Sorbus cassiana
  - †Sorbus mcjannetii
- Sorex
  - †Sorex hagermanensis – type locality for species
  - †Sorex meltoni – type locality for species
  - †Sorex palustris
  - †Sorex powersi – type locality for species
  - †Sorex rexroadensis – or unidentified comparable form
- Spermophilus
  - †Spermophilus gidleyi
- Sphecophaga – tentative report
- †Spiraea
  - †Spiraea idahoensis – type locality for species
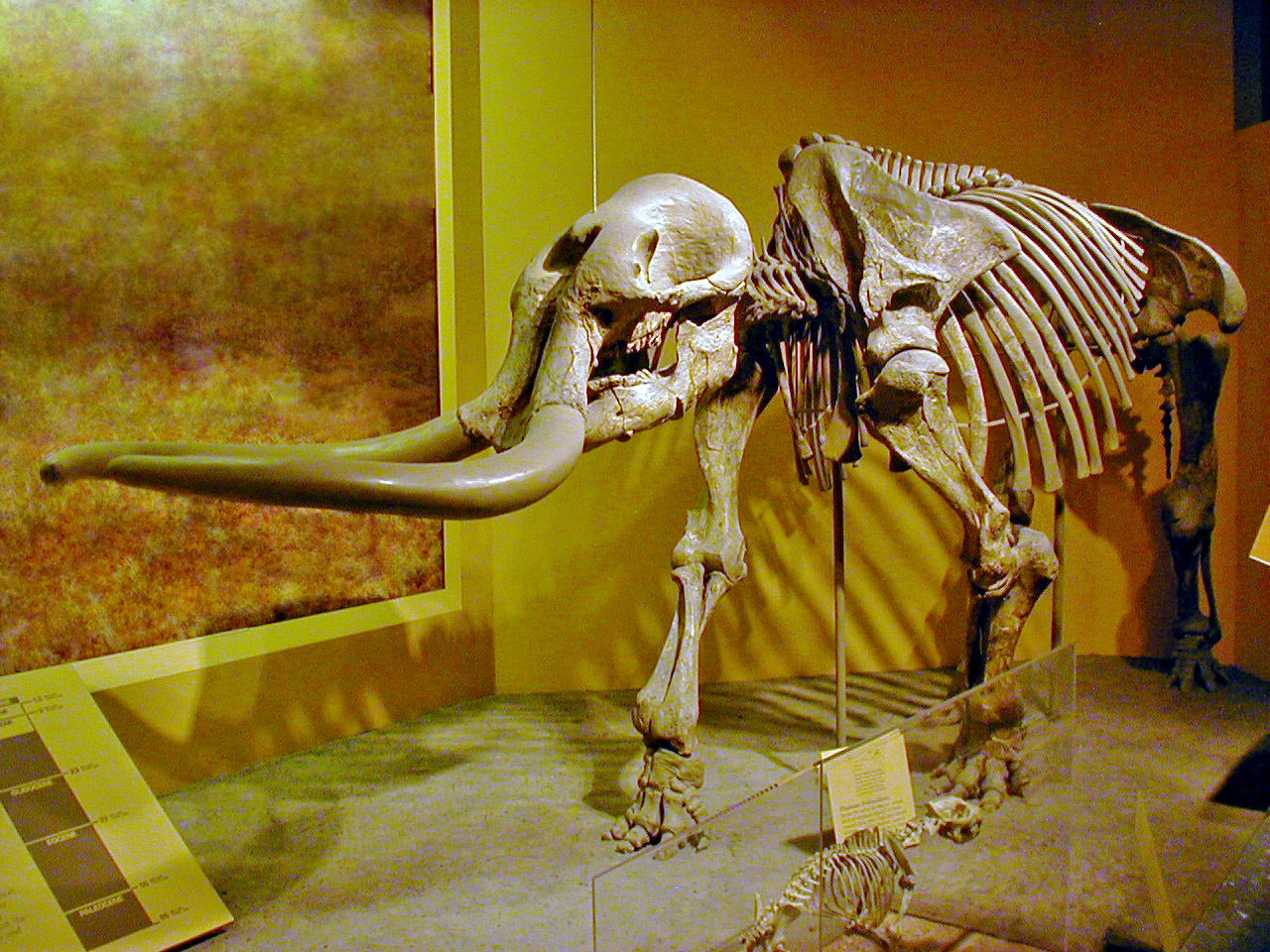
- Mounted fossilized skeleton of the Pliocene-Pleistocene elephant relative Stegomastodon
  †Stegomastodon
  - †Stegomastodon mirificus
- Sthenictis
- Sylvicola
  - †Sylvicola carolae – type locality for species
- †Symphoricarpos
  - †Symphoricarpos salmonense
  - †Symphoricarpos salmonensis

== T ==
- Taxidea
  - †Taxidea taxus
- Taxodium
  - †Taxodium dubium
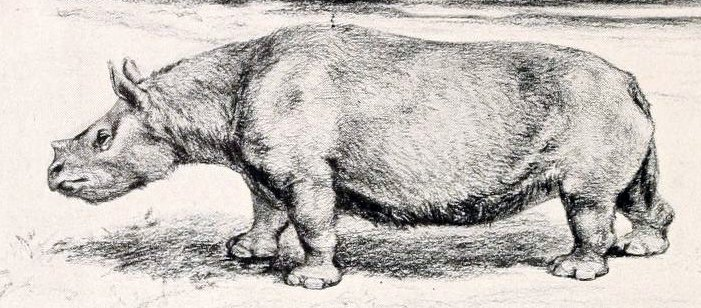
- Restoration of the Miocene-Pliocene rhinoceros Teleoceras
  †Teleoceras
- Thamnophis
- Thomomys
  - †Thomomys gidleyi
  - †Thomomys townsendii
- †Thuja
  - †Thuja dimorpha
- †Ticholeptus
  - †Ticholeptus zygomaticus
- Tilia
  - †Tilia circularis
  - †Tilia hallii
- †Trigonictis
  - †Trigonictis cookii
  - †Trigonictis macrodon
- †Trilaccogaulus
  - †Trilaccogaulus lemhiensis
- †Tsuga
  - †Tsuga mertensioides
- Typha
  - †Typha lesquereuxi

== U ==
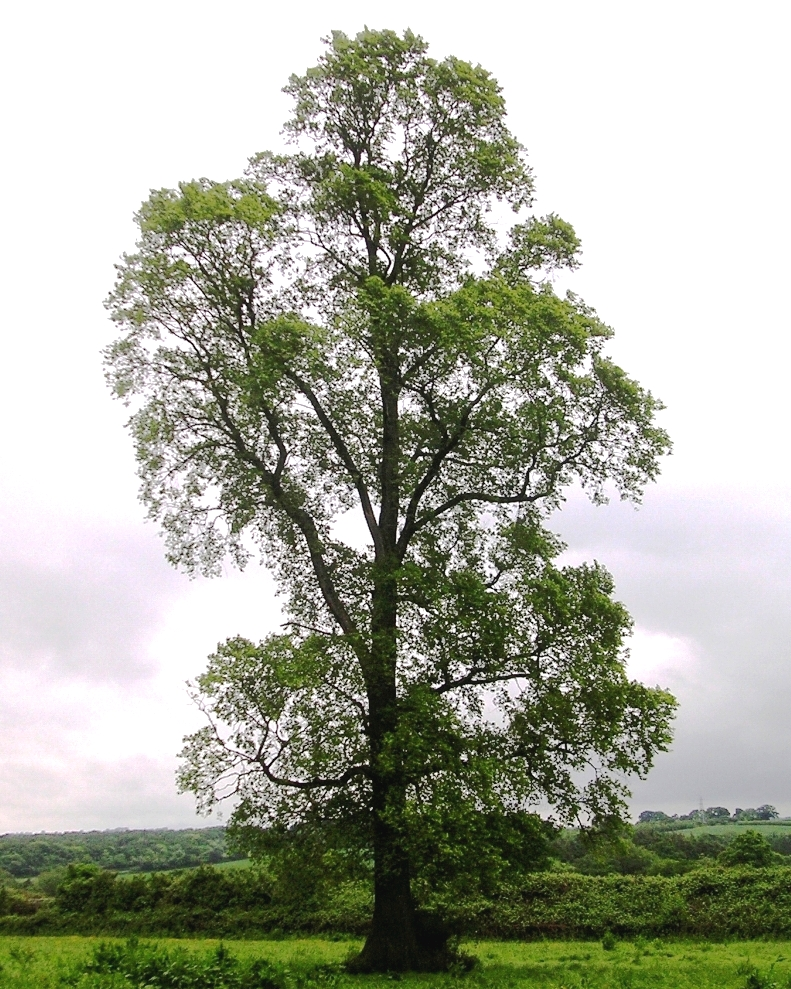
- A living Ulmus, or elm
  Ulmus
  - †Ulmus knowltoni
  - †Ulmus moorei
  - †Ulmus paucidentata
  - †Ulmus speciosa
- †Ungnadia
  - †Ungnadia clarki
- Ursus
  - †Ursus abstrusus – type locality for species

== V ==
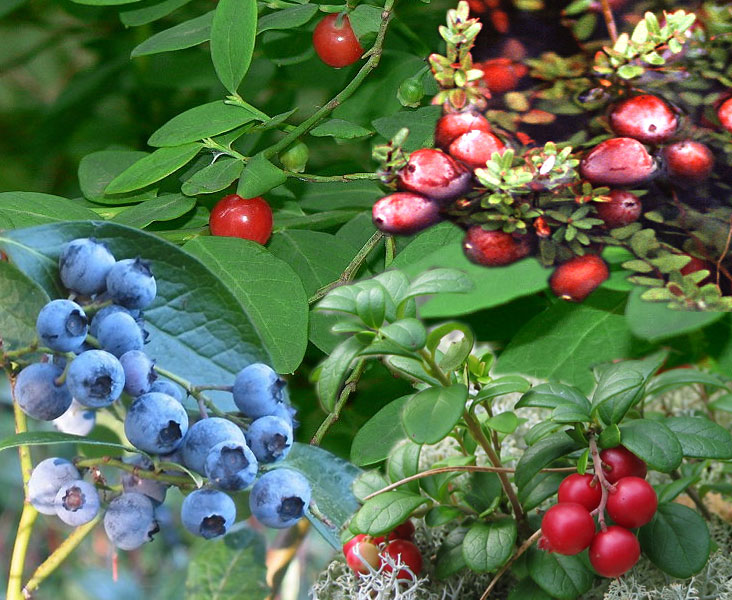
- A variety of modern Vaccinium species, clockwise from top right: cranberries, lingonberries, blueberries, and huckleberries
  †Vaccinium
  - †Vaccinium sonomensis
- †Vauquelinia
- Vulpes
  - †Vulpes vulpes

== Z ==
- Zelkova
  - †Zelkova brownii
  - †Zelkova oregoniana
