= Borophagus orc =

Borophagus orc Temporal range: Early Pliocene(Hemphillian to Blancan), 5.3–4.9 Ma

Scientific classification
- Domain: Eukaryota
- Kingdom: Animalia
- Phylum: Chordata
- Class: Mammalia
- Order: Carnivora
- Family: Canidae
- Genus: †Borophagus
- Species: †B. orc

Binomial name
- †Borophagus orc Webb, 1969

Extinct species of carnivore

Borophagus orc is an extinct species of the genus Borophagus of the subfamily Borophaginae, a group of canids endemic to North America from the 5.3 to 4.9 Mya. Borophagus orc existed for approximately 0.4 million years.

== Overview ==
Borophagus, like other Borophaginae, are loosely known as "bone-crushing" or "hyena-like" dogs. Though not the most massive borophagine by size or weight, it had a more highly evolved capacity to crunch bone than earlier, larger genera such as Epicyon, which seems to be an evolutionary trend of the group (Turner, 2004). During the Pliocene epoch, Borophagus began being displaced by Canis genera such as Canis edwardii and later by Canis dirus. Early species of Borophagus were placed in the genus Osteoborus until recently, but the genera are now considered synonyms. Borophagus orc possibly led a hyena-like lifestyle scavenging carcasses of recently dead animals.

== Taxonomy ==
Typical features of this genus are a bulging forehead and powerful jaws; it was probably a scavenger. Its crushing premolar teeth and strong jaw muscles would have been used to crack open bone, much like the hyena of the Old World. The adult animal is estimated to have been about 80 centimetres (31 in) in length, similar to a coyote, although it was much more powerfully built.

== Recombination ==
Borophagus orc was recombined by X. Wang in 1999. It was previously named Osteoborus orc.

== Fossil distribution ==
Specimens have been found at only two sites: near Withlacoochee River, Florida and coastal North Carolina.

== Notes ==
- Alan Turner, "National Geographic: Prehistoric Mammals" (Washington, D.C.: Firecrest Books Ltd., 2004), pp. 112–114. ISBN 0-7922-7134-3
- Xiaoming Wang, "The Origin and Evolution of the Dog Family" Accessed 1/30/06.
