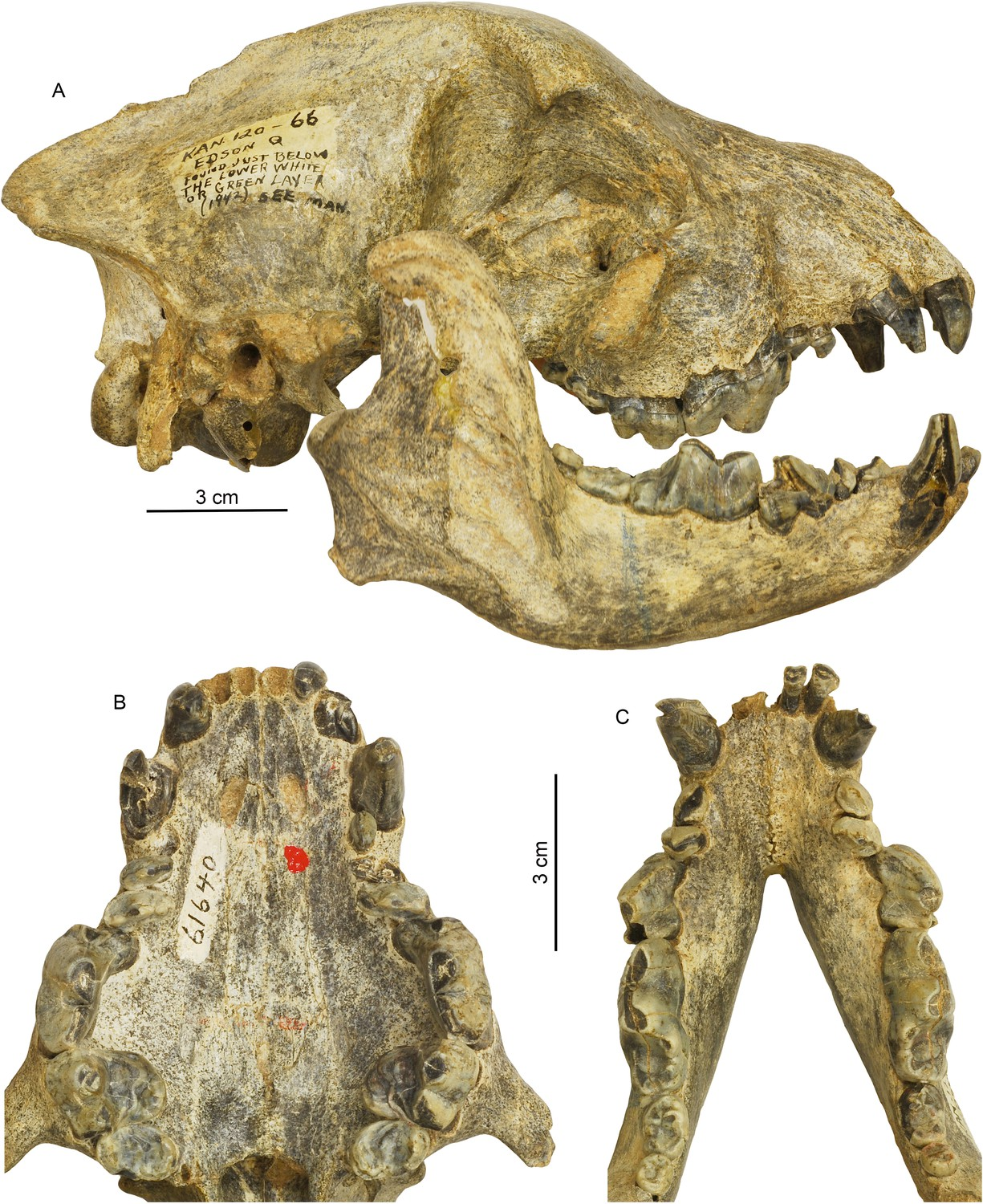
- Borophagus secundus skull

Scientific classification
- Kingdom: Animalia
- Phylum: Chordata
- Class: Mammalia
- Order: Carnivora
- Family: Canidae
- Subfamily: †Borophaginae
- Tribe: †Borophagini
- Subtribe: †Borophagina
- Genus: †Borophagus; Cope, 1892

Type species
- †Borophagus diversidens

Other species
- †B. dudleyi; †B. hilli; †B. littoralis; †B. orc; †B. parvus; †B. pugnator; †B. secundus

Synonyms
- †Cynogulo Kretzoi, 1968; †Hyaenognathus Merriam, 1903; †Porthocyon Merriam, 1903; †Osteoborus

= Borophagus =

Borophagus Temporal range: 12–2 Ma Middle Miocene - Early Pleistocne

Extinct genus of carnivores

Borophagus ("gluttonous eater") is an extinct genus of the subfamily Borophaginae, a group of canids endemic to North America from the Middle Miocene to the early Pleistocene (12—2Mya).

== Evolution ==
Borophagus, like other borophagines, are loosely known as "bone-crushing" or "hyena-like" dogs. Though not the most massive borophagine by size or weight, it had a more highly evolved capacity to crunch bone than earlier, larger genera such as Epicyon, which seems to be an evolutionary trend of the group (Turner, 2004). During the Pliocene epoch, Borophagus began being displaced by other Canid species such as Canis edwardii and later by Aenocyon dirus. Early species of Borophagus were placed in the genus Osteoborus until recently, but the genera are now considered synonyms.

== Description ==
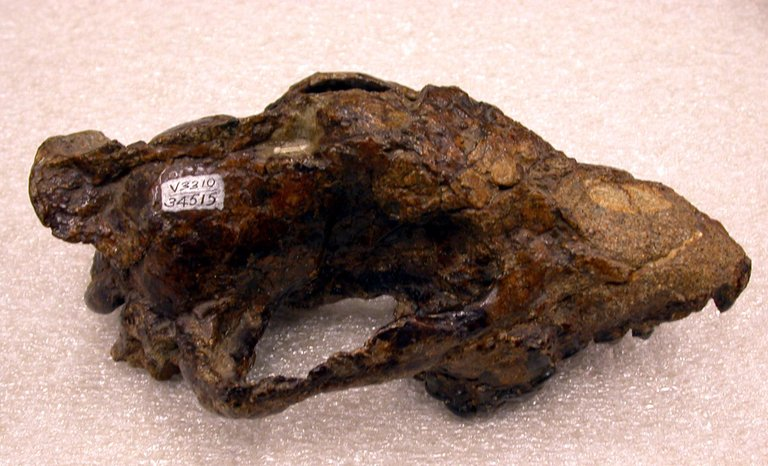
B. littoralis skull

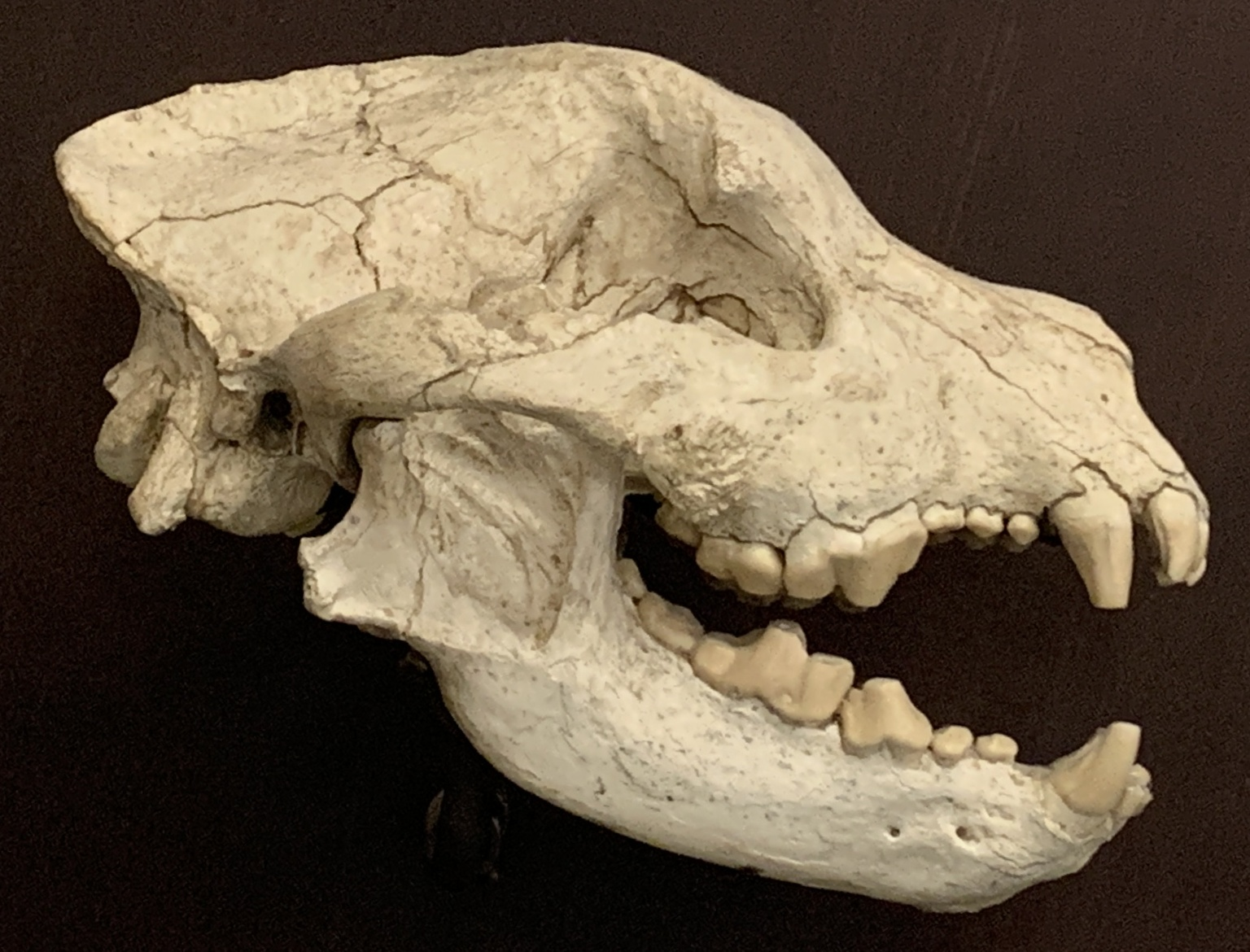
B. secundus, collected from Texas. At the AMNH.

Typical features of this genus are a bulging forehead and powerful jaws; Borophagus has been considered to be probably a scavenger by paleontologists in the past. Its crushing premolar teeth and strong jaw muscles would have been used to crack open bone, much like the hyena of the Old World. However, Borophagus fossils are so abundant and geographically widespread that some paleontologists now argue that Borophagus must have been both the dominant carnivore of its time, and thus an active predator because carrion feeding alone could not have sustained such a large population. They note that not all carnivores with bone-cracking ability are scavengers, such as the modern spotted hyena; instead, they interpret the bone-cracking ability as an adaptation to social hunting where complete utilization of a carcass was favored. Coprolites from Borophagus further vindicate its bone-crushing abilities, while simultaneously indicating it occupied a niche no longer seen in the present-day ecosystems of North America. The discovery of these coprolites also indicates that Borophagus may have been a social pack-hunter.

The adult animal is estimated to have been about 80 cm in length, similar to a coyote, although it was much more powerfully built.

== Species ==
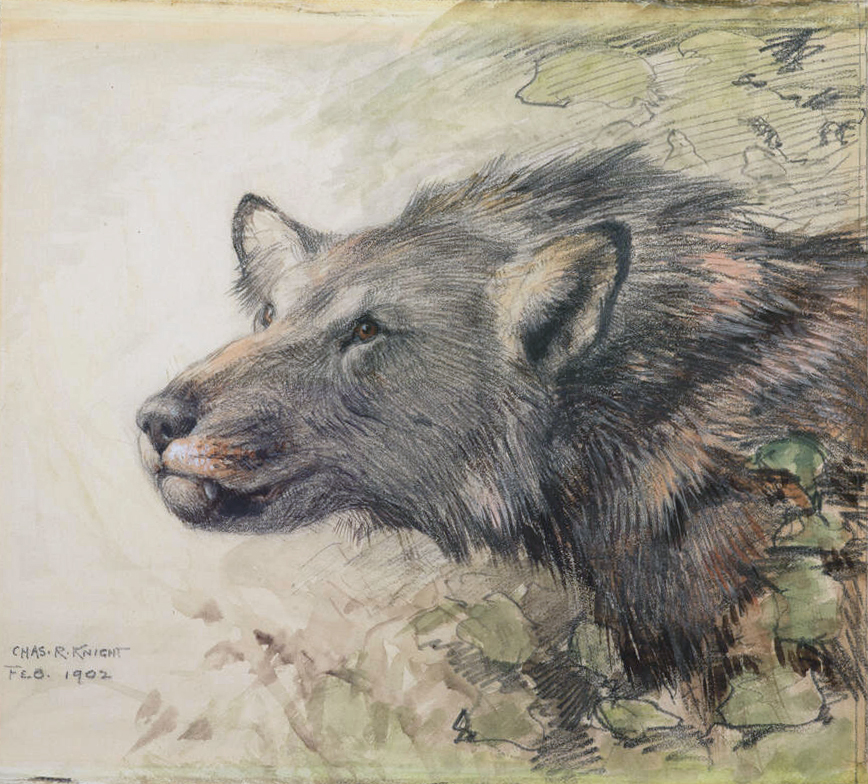
Restoration by Charles R. Knight, 1902

After:

- Borophagus diversidens (synonymous with Felis hillianus, Hyaenognathus matthewi, Hyaenognathus pachyodon, Hyaenognathus solus, Porthocyon dubius)
- Borophagus dudleyi
- Borophagus hilli synonymous with Osteoborus crassapineatus, Osteoborus progressus)
- Borophagus littoralis (syn. Osteoborus diabloensis)
- Borophagus orc
- Borophagus parvus
- Borophagus pugnator (synonymous with Osteoborus galushai)
- Borophagus secundus (synonymous with Hyaenognathus cyonoides, Hyaenognathus direptor, Osteoborus secundus)

== Paleoecology ==
In North America, in places such as Coffee Ranch in Texas, Borophagus was contemporary with the bear Agriotherium as well as the feliform Barbourofelis, the saber-toothed machairodont cat Amphimachairodus coloradensis and fellow canid Epicyon. All of these animals were potential competitors that would have occasionally conflicted with Borophagus for food and territory, though it may also have readily scavenged their kills. Prey for Borophagus included herbivores like the camel Aepycamelus, the pronghorn antelope Cosoryx, horses like Neohipparion and Nannippus, the ancient peccary Prosthennops and even rhinoceroses such as the hippo-like Teleoceras, all of which could provide a suitable meal through hunting or scavenging.
