= Satherium piscinarium =

Satherium piscinarium Temporal range: Miocene–Pliocene

Scientific classification
- Kingdom: Animalia
- Phylum: Chordata
- Class: Mammalia
- Order: Carnivora
- Family: Mustelidae
- Subfamily: Lutrinae
- Genus: †Satherium
- Species: †S. piscinarium

Binomial name
- †Satherium piscinarium (Leidy, 1873)

Extinct species of carnivore

Satherium piscinarium is an extinct species of giant otter of North America that lived during the Pliocene through Pleistocene from ~3.7–1.6 Ma. (AEO). existing for approximately 2.1 million years.

Satherium piscinarium is stated to be related to the giant otter of Brazil and Suriname. Fossil specimens have been found across the United States, from Washington in the northwest to Florida in the southeast. Idaho has yielded the largest number of collections of S. piscinarium.

== Taxonomy ==
Satherium piscinarium was originally named Lutra piscinaria by Joseph Leidy in 1873. In 1937, it was recombined as Satherium piscinarium by Barbour and Schultz. Recombination again by Bjork in 1973, Kurten and Anderson in 1980, and most recently Willemsen in 1992.
