= Satherium =

Satherium Temporal range: Pliocene - Early Pleistocene 4.9–1.6 Ma

Scientific classification
- Domain: Eukaryota
- Kingdom: Animalia
- Phylum: Chordata
- Class: Mammalia
- Order: Carnivora
- Family: Mustelidae
- Subfamily: Lutrinae
- Genus: †Satherium; Gazin, 1934

Type species
- †Satherium piscinarium (Leidy, 1873)

Other Species
- Satherium ingens Gazin, 1934

Extinct genus of mustelid

Satherium is an extinct genus of otters that lived in North America during the Pliocene and Pleistocene. Two species are known, Satherium piscinarium and Satherium ingens.

S. piscinarium was originally classified as a species of Lutra. The giant otter of South America is considered the closest living relative of this genus.
