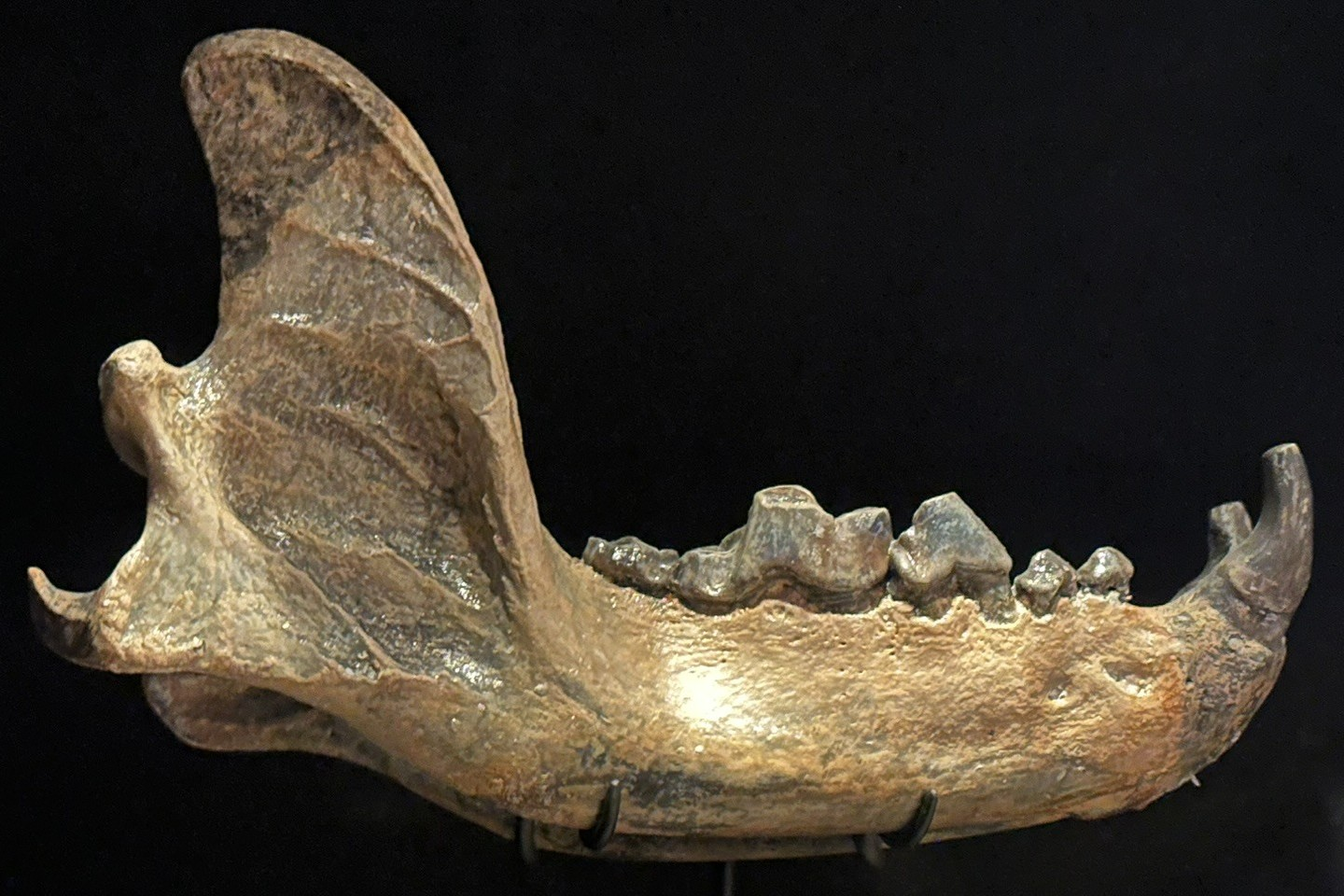

Scientific classification
- Kingdom: Animalia
- Phylum: Chordata
- Class: Mammalia
- Infraclass: Placentalia
- Order: Carnivora
- Family: Canidae
- Genus: †Borophagus
- Species: †B. pugnator

Binomial name
- †Borophagus pugnator Cook, 1922

= Borophagus pugnator =

Borophagus pugnator Temporal range: Late Miocene (Hemphillian), 10.3–9.4 Ma

Extinct species of carnivore

Borophagus pugnator is an extinct species of the genus Borophagus of the subfamily Borophaginae, a group of canids endemic to North America from the early Miocene epoch through the late Miocene epoch from 10.3 to 9.4 Ma. Borophagus pugnator existed for approximately 0.9 million years.

== Overview ==
Borophagus, like other Borophaginae, are loosely known as "bone-crushing" or "hyena-like" dogs. Though not the most massive borophagine by size or weight, it had a more highly evolved capacity to crunch bone than earlier, larger genera such as Epicyon, which seems to be an evolutionary trend of the group (Turner, 2004). During the Pliocene epoch, Borophagus began being displaced by Canis genera such as Canis edwardii and later by Canis dirus. Early species of Borophagus were placed in the genus Osteoborus until recently, but the genera are now considered synonyms. Borophagus pugnator possibly led a hyena-like lifestyle scavenging carcasses of recently dead animals.

== Taxonomy ==
Typical features of this genus are a bulging forehead and powerful jaws; it was probably a scavenger. Its crushing premolar teeth and strong jaw muscles would have been used to crack open bone, much like the hyena of the Old World. The adult animal is estimated to have been about 80 cm in length, similar to a coyote, although it was much more powerfully built.

== Recombination ==
Borophagus pugnator was originally named Porthocyon pugnator by Cook 1932. It was recombined by Matthew as Aelurodon pugnator in 1924 followed by Matthew and Stirton in 1830. It was then recombined as Osteoborus pugnator by Stirton and VanderHoof in 1933 and others until recombined as Borophagus pugnator by VanderHoof (1931) and X. Wang et al. in 1999.

== Fossil distribution ==
Specimens were found at only two sites. Near Withlacoochee River, Florida and coastal North Carolina.
