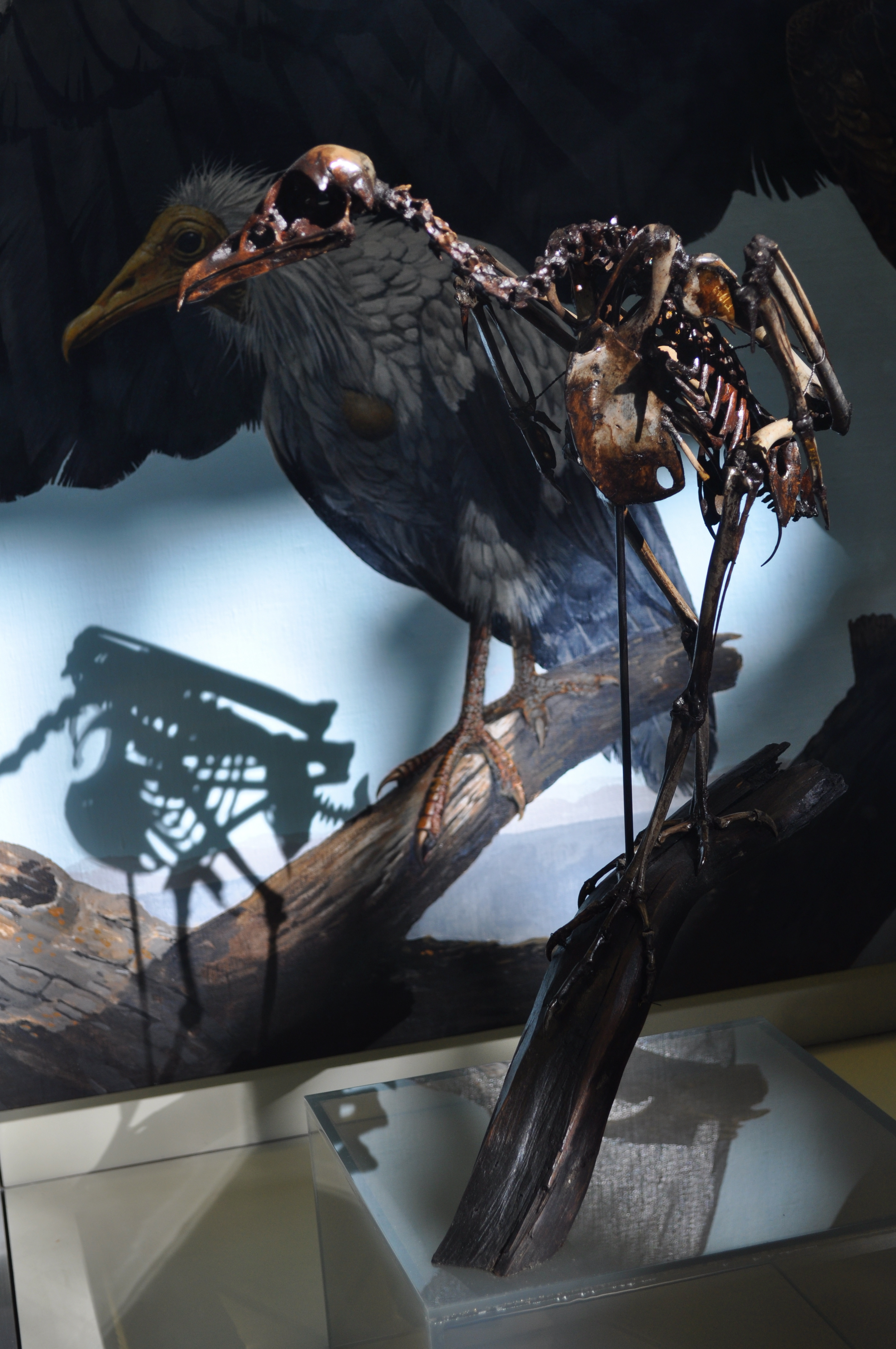
- Neophrontops americanus fossil

Scientific classification
- Kingdom: Animalia
- Phylum: Chordata
- Class: Aves
- Order: Accipitriformes
- Family: Accipitridae
- Subfamily: Gypaetinae
- Genus: †Neophrontops; Miller, 1916

Species
- See text

= Neophrontops =

Neophrontops Temporal range: Early Miocene–Late Pleistocene

Extinct genus of birds

Neophrontops is an extinct genus of Old World vulture in the subfamily Gypaetinae. Although its classification places it among the Old World vultures, the genus was native to North America. Six species have been named, ranging in age from the Early Miocene to the Late Pleistocene. All species of Neophrontops, with the exception of N. americanus are known solely from fragmentary fossil remains. The latter is represented by well preserved material from the late Middle to Late Pleistocene deposits of the La Brea Tar Pits in Southern California.

== Taxonomy ==
- N. americanus (Early Miocene to Late Pleistocene) The assignment of all remains to this species has been questioned, as it was noted that "if it had corresponded to one biological species, it would have had an extraordinary vast existence."
- N. dakotensis (Early-Middle Pliocene) Only known from a distal humerus
- N. vetustus (Middle Miocene) Known solely from a distal humerus, morphologically similar to that of N. dakotensis with approximately half the size
- N. slaughteri (Late Pliocene)
- N. vallecitoensis (Middle Pleistocene)
