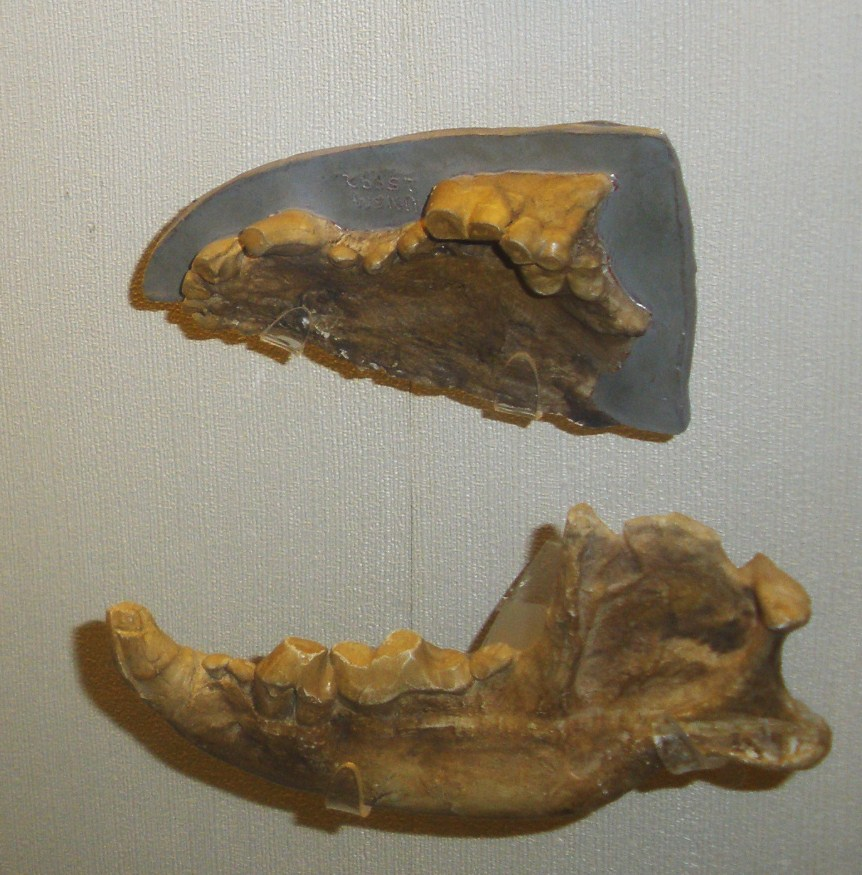

Scientific classification
- Kingdom: Animalia
- Phylum: Chordata
- Class: Mammalia
- Order: Carnivora
- Family: Canidae
- Genus: †Borophagus
- Species: †B. diversidens

Binomial name
- †Borophagus diversidens Cope, 1892

Synonyms
- †Felis hillianus Cope, 1932; †Hyaenognathus matthewi Freudenberg (1910); †Hyaenognathus pachyodon Merriam, 1903; †Hyaenognathus solus Stock (1932); †Porthocyon dubius Merriam, 1903

= Borophagus diversidens =

Borophagus diversidens Temporal range: Early Pleistocene (Blancan) 2.58–1.8 Ma

Extinct species of carnivore

Borophagus diversidens ("devouring glutton") is an extinct species of the genus Borophagus of the subfamily Borophaginae, a group of canids endemic to North America during the Early Pleistocene from the 2.58—1.8 Ma.

== Overview ==
Borophagus diversidens was named by Cope in 1892. Members of its subfamily, Borophaginae, are loosely known as "bone-crushing" or "hyena-like" dogs. Though not the most massive borophagine by size or weight, it had a more highly evolved capacity to crunch bone than earlier, larger genera such as Epicyon, which seems to be an evolutionary trend of the group (Turner, 2004). During the Pliocene epoch, Borophagus began being displaced by Canis genera such as Canis edwardii and later by Aenocyon dirus. Early species of Borophagus were placed in the genus Osteoborus until recently, but the genera are now considered synonyms. B. diversidens possibly led a hyena-like lifestyle scavenging carcasses of recently dead animals. Although Recent studies suggest that Borophagus have hunted their own prey like modern spotted hyena. So Borophagus are both Predators and Scavenger.

== Taxonomy ==
Typical features of this genus are a bulging forehead and powerful jaws; it was probably both a hunter and scavenger. Its crushing premolar teeth and strong jaw muscles would have been used to crack open bone, much like the hyena of the Old World. The adult animal is estimated to have been about 80 centimetres (31 in) in length, similar to a coyote, although it was much more powerfully built.

== Recombination ==
Borophagus diversidens was recombined as Dinocyon (Borophagus) diversidens by Matthew in 1902 and then recombined as Dinocyon diversidens by Matthew the same year. It was recombined as Hyaenarctos diversidens.

== Fossil distribution ==
Borophagus diversidens fossil specimens are very widespread from 2 sites in central Florida to central Mexico, from western Oregon and western Washington to New Mexico, Arizona, and Texas.
