= Oreonetes =

Oreonetes Temporal range: Late Eocene

Scientific classification
- Kingdom: Animalia
- Phylum: Chordata
- Class: Mammalia
- Order: Artiodactyla
- Family: †Merycoidodontidae
- Genus: †Oreonetes

Extinct genus of mammals

Oreonetes is an extinct genus of oreodont endemic to North America from the Late Eocene 38.0—33.9 Ma living approximately 4.1 million years.

Oreonetes was a very small browsing oreodont found in the forest undergrowth in the Western United States during the Late Eocene.

== Taxonomy ==
Oreonetes was named by Loomis (1924). It is not extant. It was assigned to Merycoidodontidae by Loomis (1924) and Lander (1998).

== Fossil distribution ==
Fossils are widespread through the western United States.

== Species ==
O. anceps O. douglassi

== Sister genera ==
Aclistomycter, Bathygenys, Brachycrus (syn. Pronomotherium), Desmatochoerus, Eporeodon (syn. Hypselochoerus, Pseudodesmatochoerus), Hypsiops (syn. Pseudomesoreodon, Submerycochoerus), Leptauchenia (syn. Brachymeryx, Cyclopidius, Hadroleptauchenia, Pithecistes, Pseudocyclopidius), Limnenetes, Mediochoerus, Merycoides (syn. Paramerychyus), Merycochoerus, Merycoidodon (syn. Blickohyus, Genetochoerus, Oreodon, Otionohyus, Paramerycoidodon, Prodesmatochoerus, Promesoreodon, Subdesmatochoerus), Mesoreodon, Miniochoerus (syn. Parastenopsochoerus, Platyochoerus, Stenopsochoerus), Oreodontoides, Paroreodon (syn. Epigenetochoerus), Phenacocoelus, Sespia (syn. Megasespia), Ticholeptus (syn. Poatrephes).
