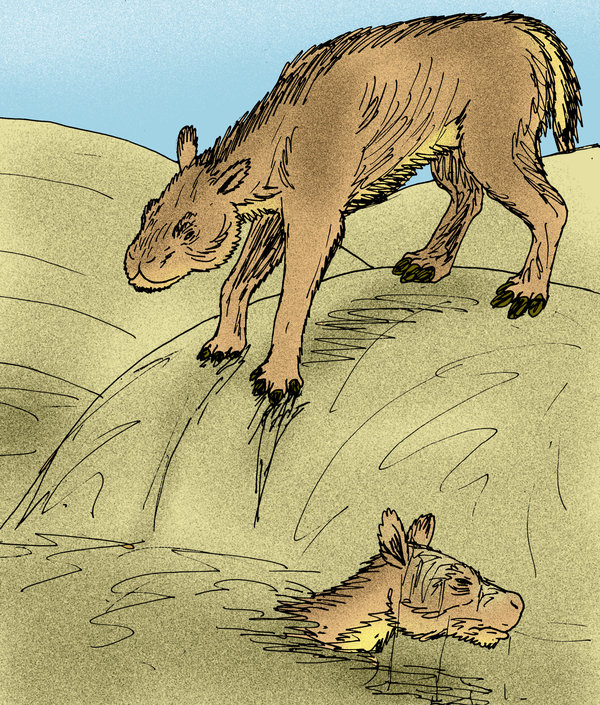
- Leptauchenia decora

Scientific classification
- Kingdom: Animalia
- Phylum: Chordata
- Class: Mammalia
- Order: Artiodactyla
- Family: †Merycoidodontidae
- Subfamily: †Leptaucheniinae

Genera
- † Leptauchenia; † Sespia

= Leptaucheniinae =

Leptaucheniinae Temporal range: Late Oligocene

Extinct subfamily of mammals

Leptaucheniinae ("Delicate Necks") was a taxon of small, goat-like oreodonts with proportionally big heads found throughout North America during the Late Oligocene. Because skeletons of Leptauchenia and Sespia have been found by the literal thousands, they are often quoted as being the most numerous fossil mammals in North America during the Late Oligocene. They had high-crowned, hypsodont teeth which were used to chew gritty vegetation, or alternatively to counteract abrasion caused by ingestion of soil.

Because the eyes and nostrils were placed high on the head, it was long assumed that Leptauchenia and Sespia were aquatic, or semi-aquatic animals. However, because their fossils have never been found in floodplain deposits or river channels, and their plague-like abundance in fossil sand dunes, Donald Prothero suggests that they were desert-dwelling animals. According to Prothero's interpretation, the high-placed eyes and nostrils served to filter out sand while burrowing.
