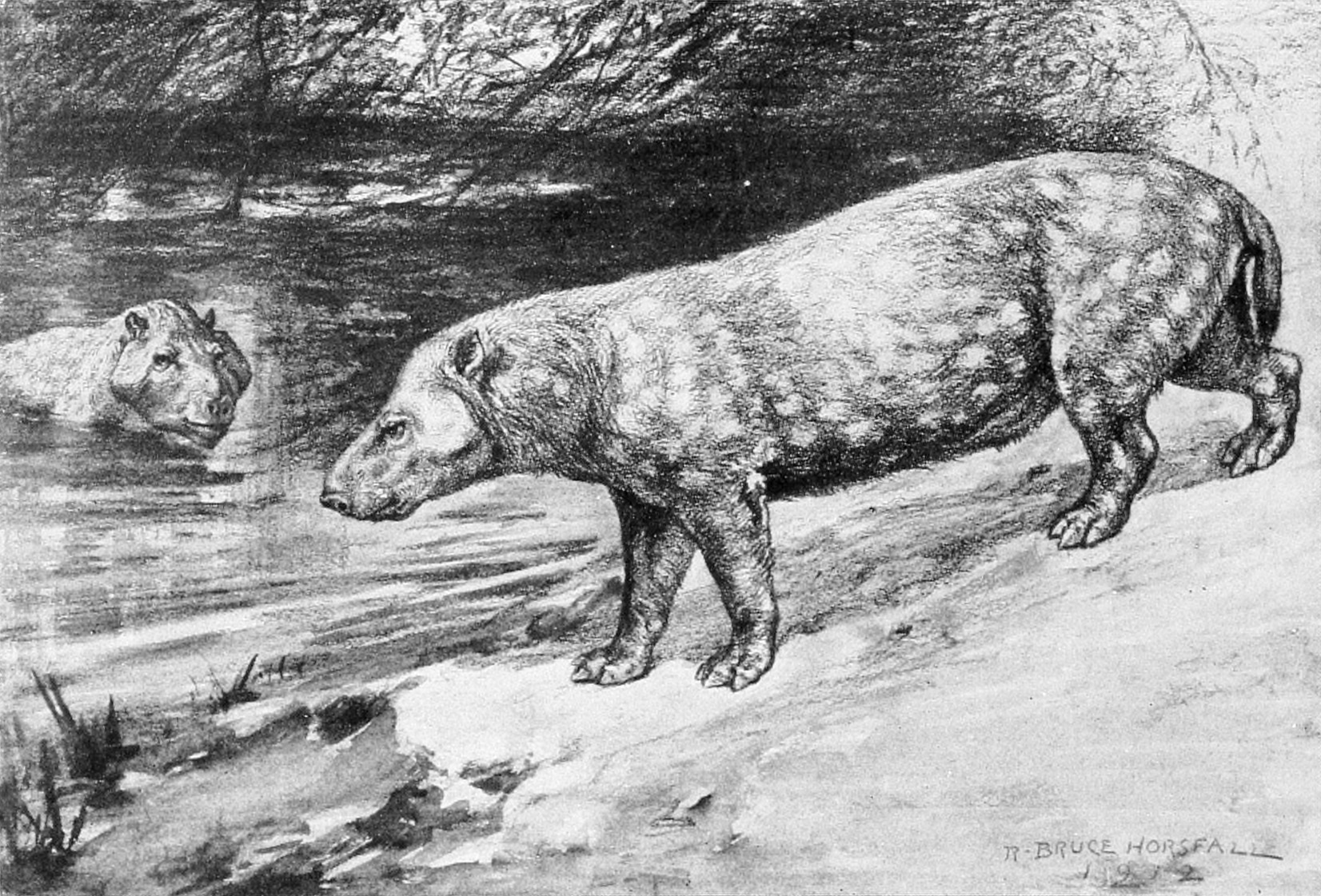
- Promerycochoerus carrikeri

Scientific classification
- Kingdom: Animalia
- Phylum: Chordata
- Class: Mammalia
- Order: Artiodactyla
- Family: †Merycoidodontidae
- Genus: †Promerycochoerus; Douglass, 1901

Species
- P. proprius (type); P. carrikeri; P. chelydra; P. magnus; P. matthewi; P. pinensis; P. superbus; P. vantasselensis

= Promerycochoerus =

Promerycochoerus Temporal range: Early Miocene, 27.3–18.5 Ma

Extinct genus of mammals

Promerycochoerus ("Before Merycochoerus" or "Before Ruminating Hog") is an extinct genus of hippopotamus-like oreodont artiodactyl that lived in Central North America during the Early Miocene, 27.3—18.5 million years ago.

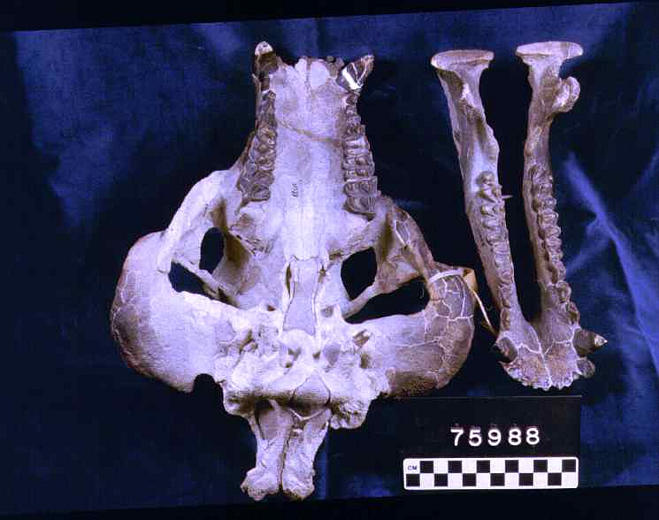
Promerycochoerus superbus

The 1 m (3 ft 4 in) long creature is thought to have been amphibious, as all species possessed an elongated, barrel-shaped body and short limbs that are typical adaptations found in semi-aquatic mammals. P. superbus had a long tapir-like face, while P. carrikeri had a short, somewhat pig-like face.
