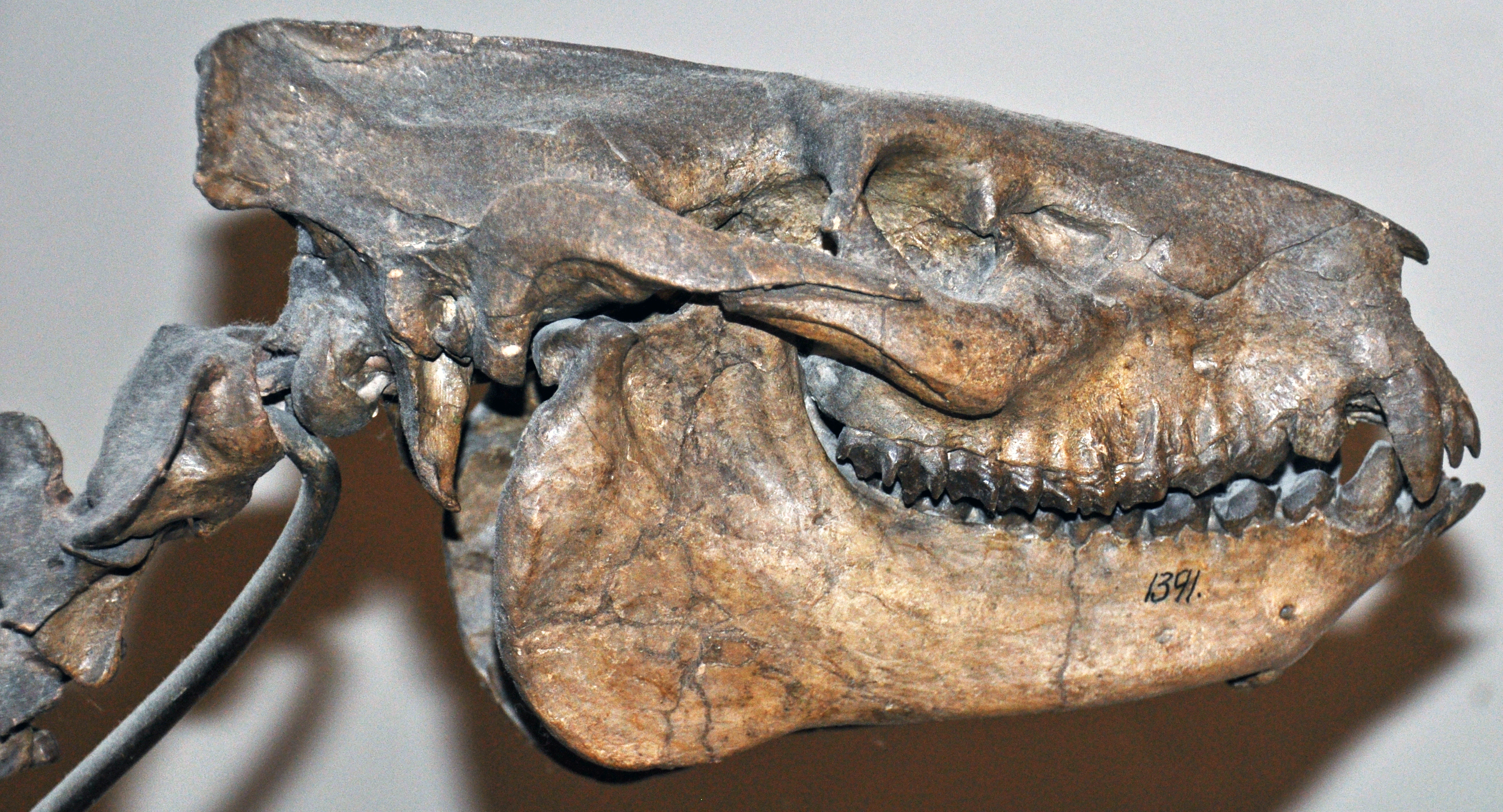
- Diplobunops matthewi – fossil mammal skull from the Eocene of Utah, USA

Scientific classification
- Kingdom: Animalia
- Phylum: Chordata
- Class: Mammalia
- Order: Artiodactyla
- Family: †Agriochoeridae
- Genus: †Diplobunops; Peterson, 1919

Type species
- Diplobunops matthewi Peterson, 1919

Other species
- Diplobunops crassus Scott, 1945 Diplobunops kardoula Emery et al., 2016

= Diplobunops =

Diplobunops Temporal range: Lutetian–Priabonian

Extinct genus of merycoidodontoid artiodactyl

Diplobunops is an extinct genus of merycoidodont ungulate that lived during the Eocene epoch.

== Taxonomy ==
Diplobunops was described in 1919 but was later deemed a junior synonym of Agriochoerus. For a time assigned to the genus Agriochoerus, the species Diplobunops matthewi, the type species of Diplobunops, was reclassified into the genus Diplobunops in 2016 as the genus was revived.
