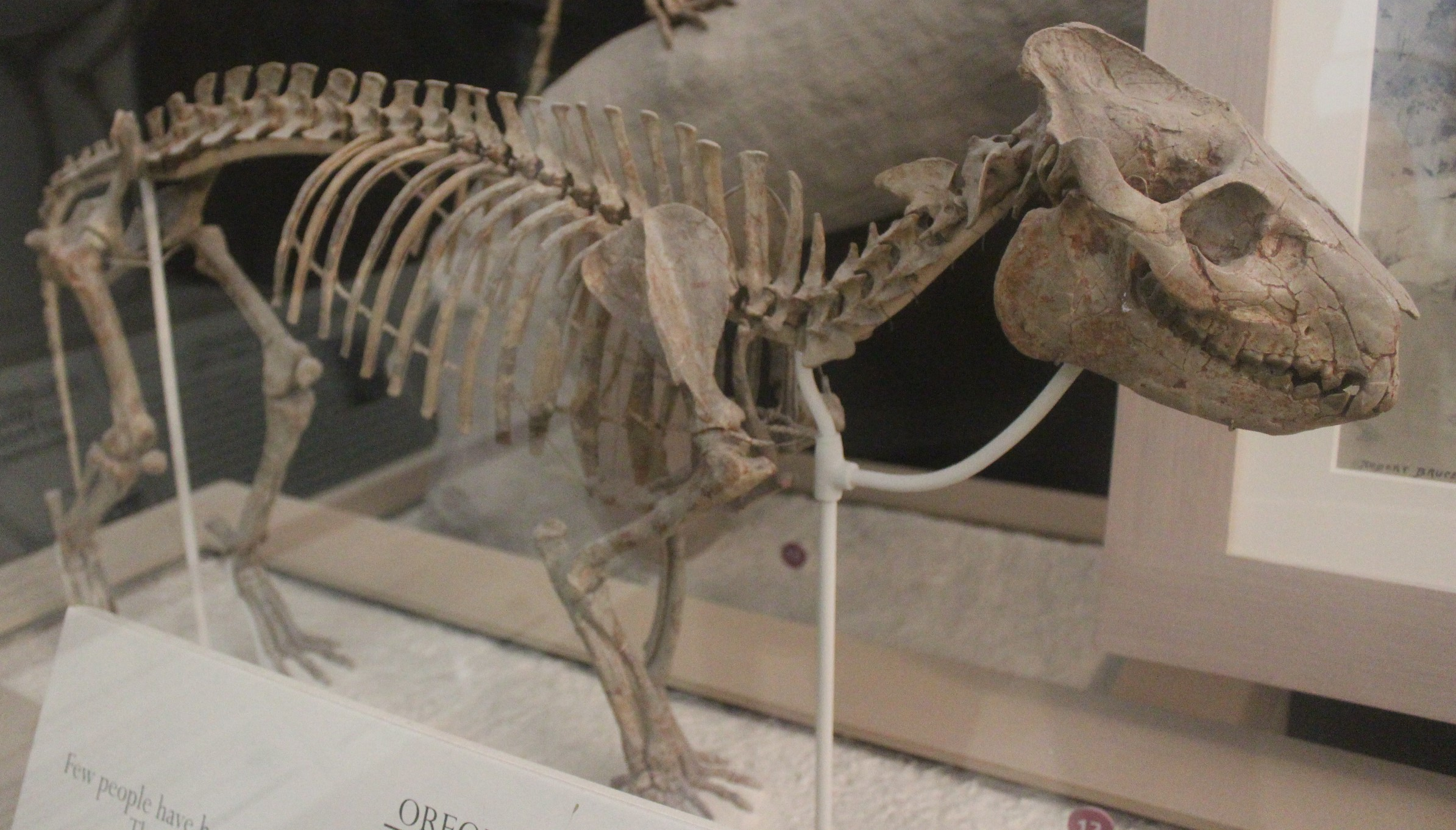
- Merycoidodon culbertsoni skeleton, American Museum of Natural History

Scientific classification
- Kingdom: Animalia
- Phylum: Chordata
- Class: Mammalia
- Infraclass: Placentalia
- Order: Artiodactyla
- Suborder: Tylopoda
- Superfamily: †Merycoidodontoidea

Families
- †Agriochoeridae; †Merycoidodontidae; †Oreonetinae; †Leptaucheniinae; †Merycoidodontinae; †Miniochoerinae; †Desmatochoerinae; †Promerycochoerinae; †Merychyinae; †Eporeodontinae; †Phenacocoelinae; †Ticholeptinae; †Merycochoerinae

= Merycoidodontoidea =

Merycoidodontoidea Temporal range: 35–5 Ma Late Eocene to Miocene

Extinct superfamily of mammals

Merycoidodontoidea, informally known as "oreodonts" or "ruminating hogs," are an extinct superfamily of prehistoric cud-chewing artiodactyls with short faces and fang-like canine teeth. As their name implies, some of the better known forms were generally hog-like in stature, and the group has traditionally been placed within the Suina (pigs, peccaries and their ancestors), though some recent work suggests they may have been more closely related to camels. "Oreodont" means "mountain teeth," referring to the multi-peaked appearance of their molars.

Most merycoidodontoids were sheep-sized, though some genera grew to the size of cattle. They were heavy-bodied, with short four-toed hooves and comparatively long tails. Nearly all merycoidodontoids were terrestrial short-toed mammals belonging to the highly diverse family Merycoidodontidae. A few species belong to another family, Agriochoeridae, which retain particularly long tails and claws, potentially useful for climbing trees.

In life, the animals would have looked rather pig- or sheep-like, but features of their teeth indicate they were more closely related to camelids. They were most likely woodland and grassland browsers. They were among the most abundant and widespread large herbivorous mammals in North America during the Oligocene and Miocene epochs. Later forms diversified to suit a range of different habitats. For example, Promerycochoerus had adaptations suggesting a semiamphibious lifestyle, similar to that of modern hippos.

== Taxonomy ==
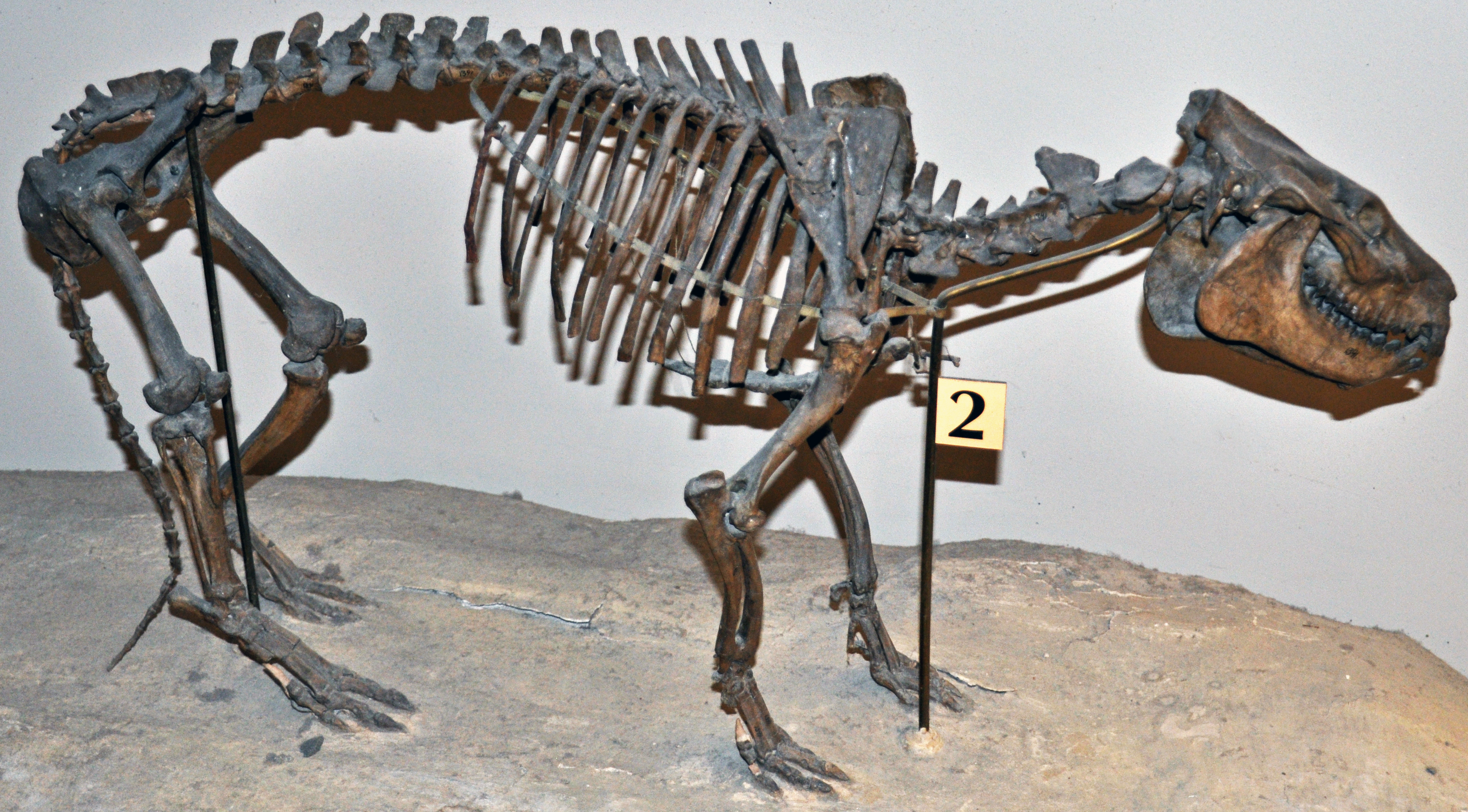
Skeleton of Diplobunops, an agriochoerid from late Eocene Utah

Merycoidodontoidea is divided into two families: the Merycoidodontidae (originally known as Oreodontidae) which contains all of the derived taxa, and the Agriochoeridae, which contains the smaller and more basal taxa. Together they form the now-extinct suborder Oreodonta. Oreodonts may have been distantly related to pigs, hippopotamuses, and the pig-like peccaries. Indeed, some scholars place Merycoidodontidae within the pig-related suborder Suina (Suiformes). Other scholars place oreodonts closer to camels in the suborder Tylopoda. Still, other experts put the oreodonts together with the short-lived cainotheres in the taxonomic suborder Ancodonta comprising these two groups of extinct ancodonts. All scholars agree, however, that the oreodont was an early form of even-toed ungulate, belonging to the order Artiodactyla. Today, most evidence points towards the oreodonts being tylopods, along with camels, xiphodonts, and protoceratids.

Over 50 genera of Oreodonta have been described in the paleozoological literature. However, oreodonts are widely considered to be taxonomically oversplit, and many of these genera may prove to be synonymous. The last researchers to fully review oreodont taxonomy were C. Bertrand Schultz and Charles H. Falkenbach in the 1960s. Their work has been criticized for erecting excessive numbers of genera, based in part on apparent anatomical differences between different specimens that were actually taphonomic deformations due to postburial forces. Undeformed skulls would be placed in one genus, while skulls crushed from side to side would be placed in a second genus and skulls crushed from front to back would be placed in a third genus. Researchers are beginning to restudy oreodonts and synonymize many genera, but as of 2004 only a few groups had been reviewed.

== Natural history ==
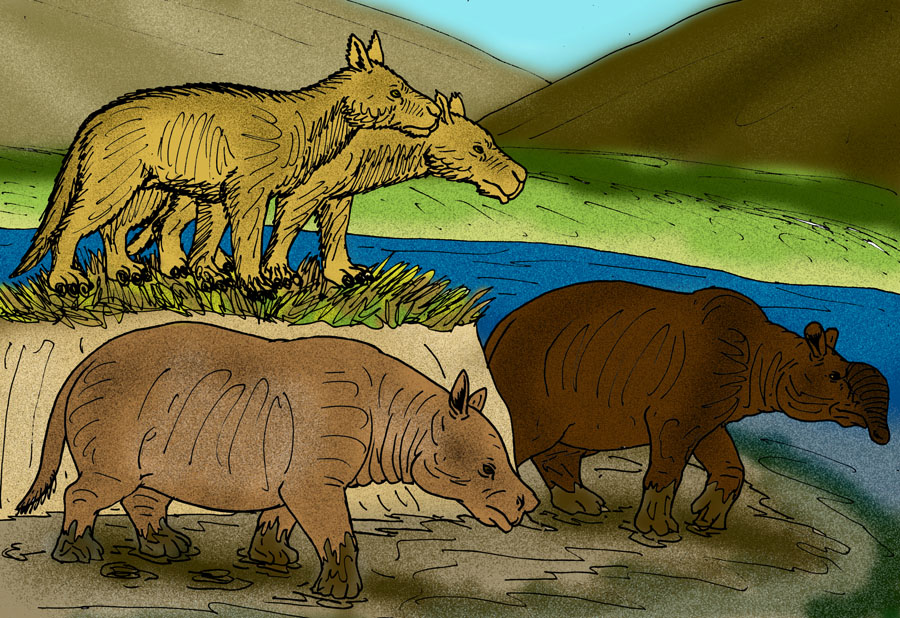
Reconstructions of various Miocene oreodonts, including Merycochoerus, Promerycochoerus, and Brachycrus.

This diverse group of stocky prehistoric mammals grazed amid the grasslands, prairies, or savannas of North and Central America throughout much of the Cenozoic era. First appearing 48 million years ago (Mya) during the warm Eocene epoch of the Paleogene period, the oreodonts dominated the American landscape 34 to 23 Mya during the dry Oligocene epoch, but they mysteriously disappeared 4 Mya during the colder Pliocene epoch of the late Neogene period.

Today, fossil jaws and teeth of the Oreodonta are commonly found amid the 'Oreodon beds' (White River Fauna) of the White River badlands in South Dakota, Nebraska, Colorado and Wyoming. Many oreodont bones have also been reported at the John Day Fossil Beds National Monument in Oregon. Some oreodonts have been found at Agate Fossil Beds National Monument. In Oligocene/Miocene Florida, oreodonts are surprisingly rare. Instead of the swarms found elsewhere, only six genera of oreodonts are known to have ranged there, and only one, Mesoreodon, is known from a single, good skeleton.

== Paleoecology ==
The majority of oreodonts are presumed to have lived in herds, as suggested by the thousands of individuals in the various mass mortalities seen in the White River Badlands, Nebraska Oreodont beds, or Chula Vista, California.

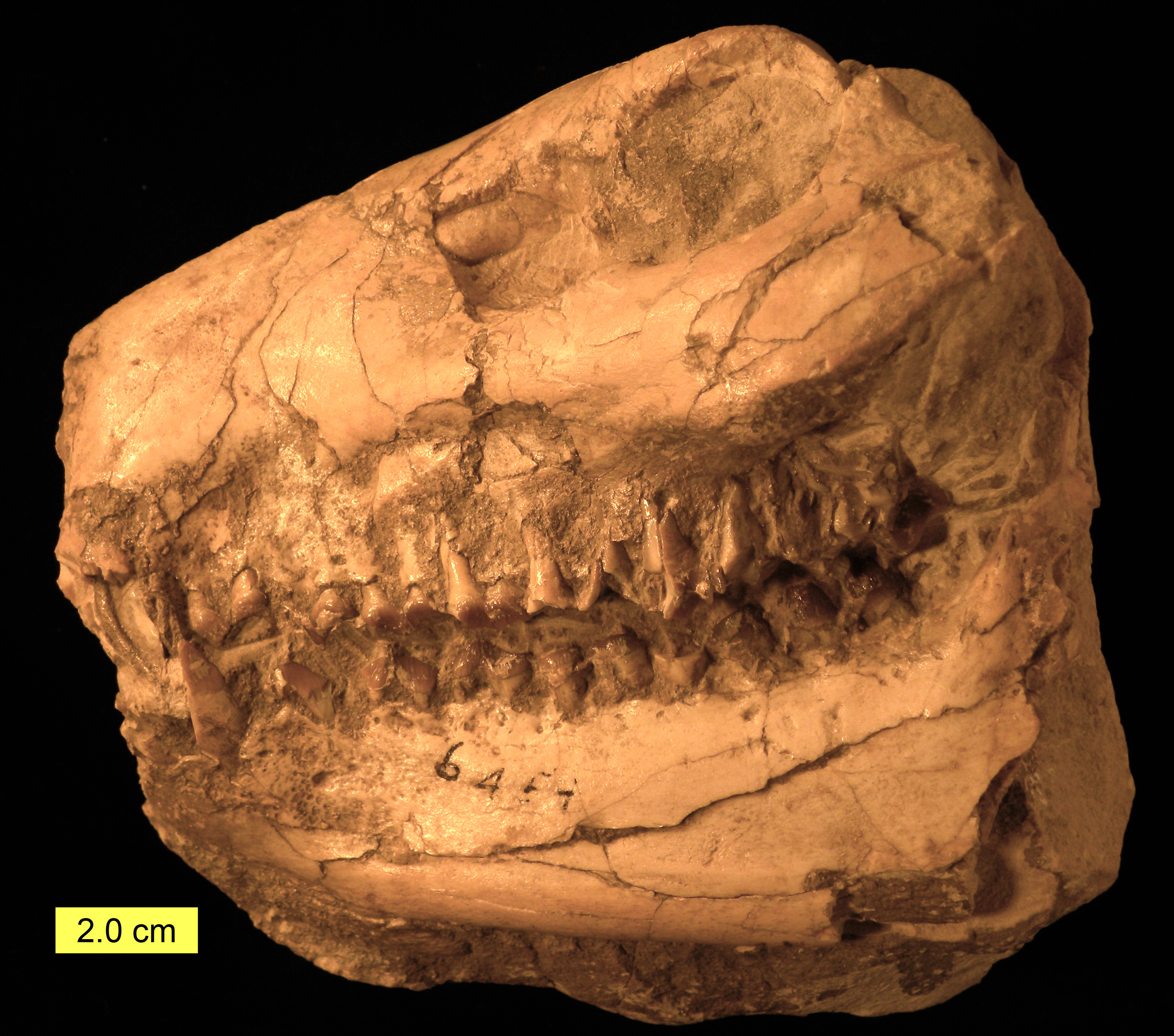
Merycoidodon skull from the Oligocene of Nebraska

Oreodonts underwent a huge diversification during the Oligocene and Miocene, adapting to a number of ecological niches, including:

- Semiaquatic – hippo-like Promerycochoerus
- Trunked browser – tapir-like Brachycrus
- Large grazer – cow-sized Eporeodon
- Medium-sized grazer – goat-like Merycoidodon
- Small desert herbivore – goat- to cat-sized Sespia
- Medium desert herbivore – Mesoreodon and the ubiquitous Leptauchenia

== Classification ==
The family Merycoidodontidae is divided into eleven subfamilies, with four genera not included in any subfamily (incertae sedis) because they are either regarded as basal oreodonts, or their status within the family remains uncertain.

- Family †Agriochoeridae
  - †Agriochoerus
  - †Diplobunops
  - †Protoreodon
- Family †Merycoidodontidae
  - subfamily incertae sedis
    - †Aclistomycter
    - †Merychyus
    - †Pseudogenetochoerus
    - †Pseudoleptauchenia
  - Subfamily †Oreonetinae
    - †Bathygenys
    - †Oreonetes
  - Subfamily †Leptaucheniinae
    - Tribe †Leptaucheniini
      - †Limnenetes
      - †Leptauchenia
    - Tribe †Sespiini
      - †Sespia
  - Subfamily †Merycoidodontinae (syn. Oreodontinae)
    - †Merycoidodon (syn. Blickohyus, Genetochoerus, Oreodon, Otionohyus, Paramerycoidodon, Prodesmatochoerus, Promesoreodon, Subdesmatochoerus)
    - †Mesoreodon
  - Subfamily †Miniochoerinae
    - †Miniochoerus (syn. Paraminiochoerus, Parastenopsochoerus, Platyochoerus, Pseudostenopsochoerus, Stenopsochoerus)
  - Subfamily †Desmatochoerinae
    - †Desmatochoerus
    - †Eporeodon
    - †Megoreodon
  - Subfamily †Promerycochoerinae
    - †Promerycochoerus
    - †Merycoides
  - Subfamily †Merychyinae
    - †Oreodontoides
    - †Paroreodon
    - †Merycoides
    - †Merychyus
  - Subfamily †Eporeodontinae
    - †Dayohyus (syn. Eucrotaphus deemed nomen dubium)
    - †Eporeodon
  - Subfamily †Phenacocoelinae
    - †Phenacocoelus
    - †Hypsiops
  - Subfamily †Ticholeptinae
    - †Mediochoerus
    - †Ticholeptus
    - †Ustatochoerus
  - Subfamily †Merycochoerinae
    - †Merycochoerus
    - †Brachycrus

In Lander (1998), the classification of Oreodontoidea was as follows:

- Family Agriochoeridae Leidy, 1869 (syn. Artionychidae, Eomerycidae, Protoreodontidae)
  - Subfamily Agriochoerinae Gill, 1872 (syn. Diplobunopsinae)
    - Agriochoerus Leidy, 1850b (syn. Agriomeryx, Artionyx, Coloreodon, Diplobunops, Eomeryx, Merycopater)
  - Subfamily Protoreodontinae Scott, 1890
    - Protoreodon Scott and Osborn, 1887 (syn. Agriotherium, Chorotherium, Hyomeryx, Mesagriochoerus, Protagriochoerus)
- Family Merycoidodontidae
  - Subfamily Bathygeniinae Lander, 1998
    - Bathygenys Douglass, 1901 (syn. Megabathygenys, Parabathygenys)
  - Subfamily Aclistomycterinae Lander, 1998
    - Aclistomycter Wilson, 1971
  - Subfamily Leptaucheniinae Schultz and Falkenbach, 1940
    - Leptauchenia Leidy, 1856 (syn. Brachymeryx, Cyclopidius, Hadroleptauchenia, Limnenetes, Pithecistes, Pseudocyclopidius, Pseudoleptauchenia)
    - Sespia Stock, 1930 (syn. Megasespia)
  - Subfamily Miniochoerinae Schultz and Falkenbach, 1956 (syn. Oreonetinae, ?Cotylopinae, ?Merycoidodontinae, ?Oreodontinae)
  - Subfamily Eucrotaphinae Lander, 1998
  - Subfamily Merycochoerinae Schultz and Falkenbach, 1940 (syn. Desmatochoerinae, Eporeodontinae, Promerycochoerinae)
  - Subfamily Phenacocoelinae Schultz and Falkenbach, 1950
  - Subfamily Ticholeptinae Schultz and Falkenbach, 1941 (syn. Merychyinae)
