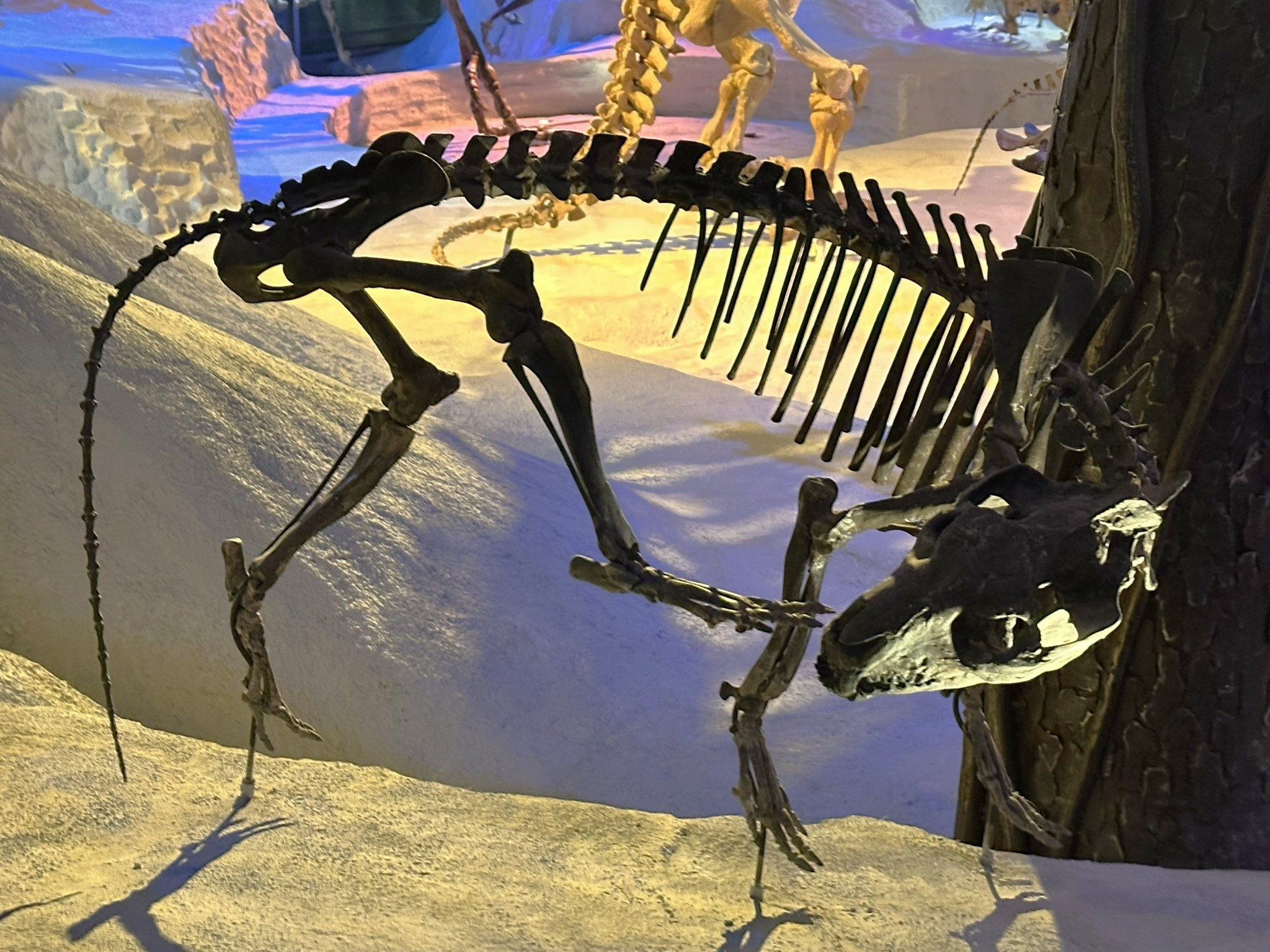
- Reconstructed M. floridensis skeleton, Florida Museum of Natural History

Scientific classification
- Kingdom: Animalia
- Phylum: Chordata
- Class: Mammalia
- Order: Artiodactyla
- Family: †Merycoidodontidae
- Subfamily: †Merycoidodontinae
- Genus: †Mesoreodon; Scott, 1893

Type species
- †Mesoreodon chelonyx Scott, 1893

Species
- M. chelonyx Scott, 1893; M. floridensis MacFadden & Morgan, 2003; M. minor Douglass, 1903

= Mesoreodon =

Mesoreodon Temporal range: Oligocene to early Miocene, 33–20.6 Ma

Extinct genus of mammals

Mesoreodon is an extinct genus of terrestrial herbivore of the family Merycoidodontidae, subfamily Merycoidodontinae (the oreodonts), endemic to North America during the Whitneyan stage of the Oligocene-Miocene epochs (33—20.6 mya) existing for approximately 12.4 million years.

== Taxonomy ==
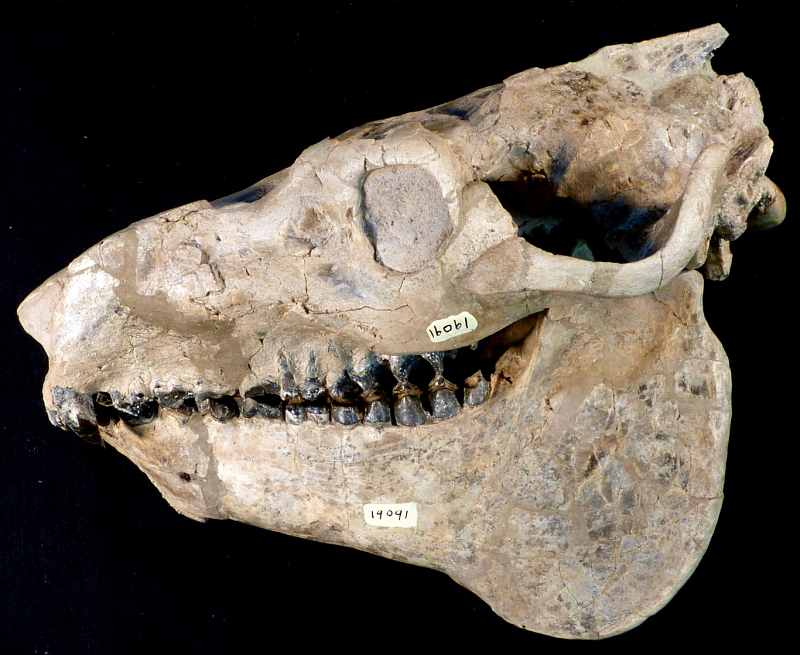
Fossil skull of M. chelonyx, the type species

The following fossil species are known:

- M. chelonyx Scott, 1893 (type species) - Oligocene/Early Miocene (Arikareean) of the western United States (Idaho, Nebraska, Montana, Wyoming)
- M. floridensis MacFadden & Morgan, 2003 - Late Oligocene of Florida, US (Parachucla Formation)
- M. minor Douglass, 1903 - Oligocene/Early Miocene (Arikareean to Harrisonian) of the western United States (Oregon, Idaho, Nebraska, South Dakota, Montana, Wyoming)

== Morphology ==
It was a large animal and ate the numerous low-growing plants and early grasses that sprung up on the plains of North America. It had a rather robust jaw, and like all oreodonts, sharp canine teeth.

Unlike many other oreodonts, who were restricted to certain habitats and places, Mesoreodon seemed to have been a cosmopolite. Fossils of Mesoreodon have been found in the Miocene deserts of California, the prairies of Nebraska, Wyoming, and South Dakota, southeastern Idaho, John Day Fossil Beds in Oregon, and Florida. In fact, Mesoreodon is the only Florida oreodont known from a complete skeleton, odd, since oreodonts had a continent-wide dominance until their extinction. They lived in all environments, and must have been very adaptable.

Mesoreodon had ossified vocal cords; the only other animal to have these in modern times is the howler monkey. Mesoreodon may have been a "screaming oreodont" using loud noises to intimidate its enemies and rivals.
