= Protoreodon =

Protoreodon Temporal range: Middle Eocene-Early Oligocene 46.2–33.9 Ma

Scientific classification
- Kingdom: Animalia
- Phylum: Chordata
- Class: Mammalia
- Order: Artiodactyla
- Family: †Agriochoeridae
- Genus: †Protoreodon; Scott & Osborn, 1887.

Species
- P. parvus; P. petersoni

Extinct genus of mammals

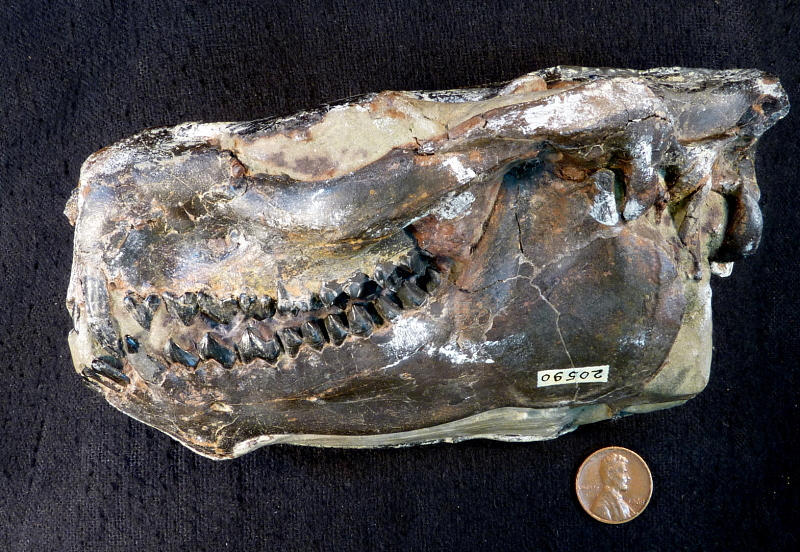

Protoreodon ("first Oreodon") was a genus of agriochoerid merycoidodontoid from California, Texas, Utah and Wyoming.
