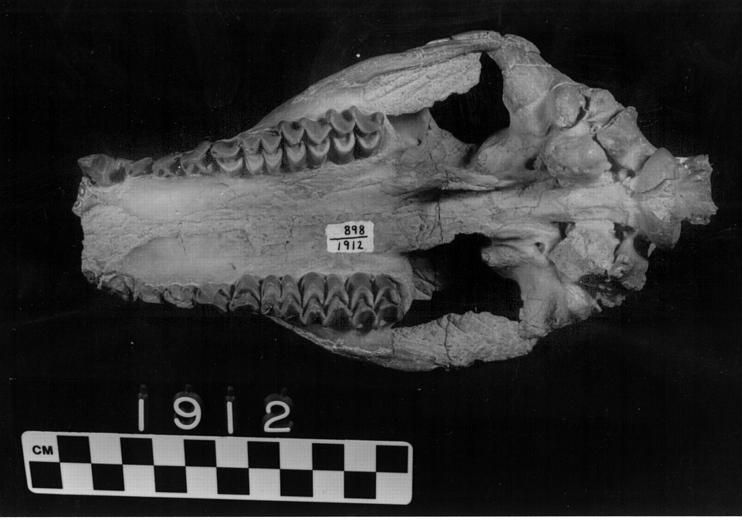
- Skull

Scientific classification
- Kingdom: Animalia
- Phylum: Chordata
- Class: Mammalia
- Order: Artiodactyla
- Family: †Merycoidodontidae
- Subfamily: †Eporeodontinae
- Genus: †Eporeodon; Marsh, 1875

Species
- Eporeodon major; Eporeodon occidentalis; Eporeodon pygmyus

= Eporeodon =

Eporeodon Temporal range: Oligocene

Extinct genus of mammals

Eporeodon is an extinct genus of oreodont belonging to the family Merycoidontidae. It lived from the Oligocene epoch 30.8—24.8 mya) existing for approximately 6 million years.

== Description ==
The species of the genus are among the largest members of the family Merycoidontidae. About the size of a sheep, its fossils are also some of the largest found in the Badlands. It was much larger than Merycoidodon and Miniochoerus, its contemporaries in the Late Oligocene. On the other hand, Eporeodon was a rare oreodont, as its fossils only make up about one percent of all oreodont fossils found in the Badlands. Their skulls were much shorter and squatter than those of Merycoidodon, but were longer than those of Miniochoerus. Promesoreodon Schultz and Falkenbach, 1949 is a junior synonym of this genus.

== Images ==
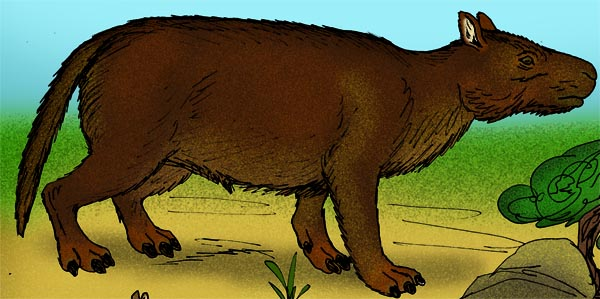
Restoration of Eporeodon major

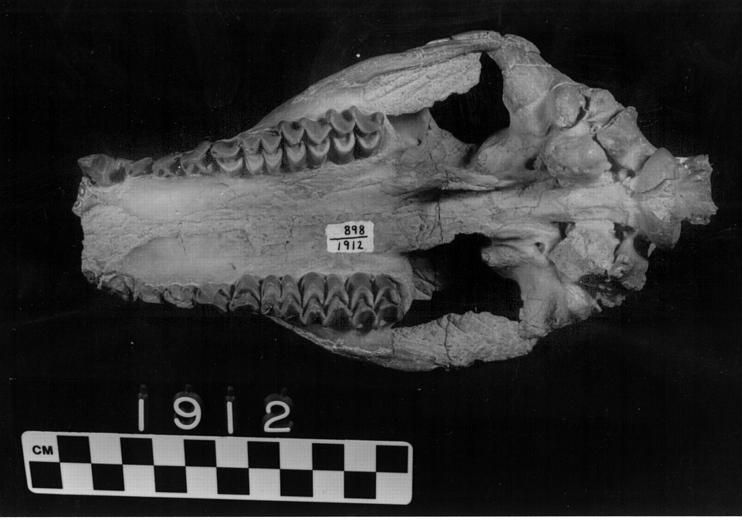
Eporeodon occidentalis skull
