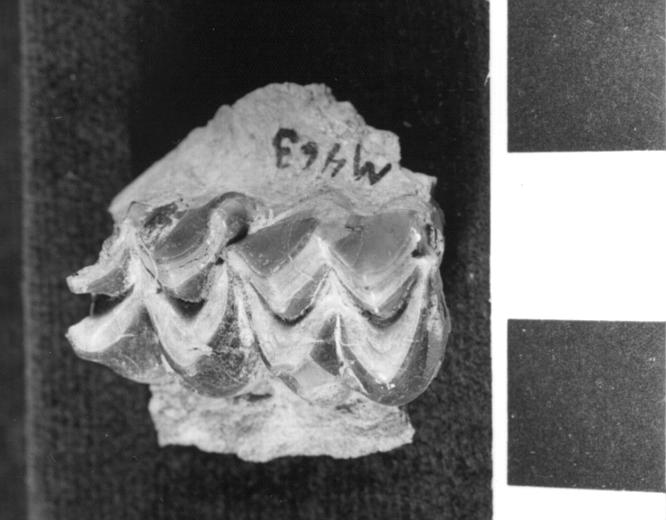
- Phenacocoelus parvus teeth

Scientific classification
- Kingdom: Animalia
- Phylum: Chordata
- Class: Mammalia
- Infraclass: Placentalia
- Order: Artiodactyla
- Family: †Merycoidodontidae
- Genus: †Phenacocoelus; Peterson 1907

Species
- Phenacocoelus typus Peterson 1907

= Phenacocoelus =

Phenacocoelus Temporal range: Early Miocene

Extinct genus of mammals

Phenacocoelus is an extinct genus of Artiodactyl of the family Merycoidodontidae, endemic to North America. They lived during the Early Miocene 24.8—20.4 mya, existing for approximately 4 million years. Fossils have been uncovered in eastern Wyoming and western Nebraska, both in the United States.
