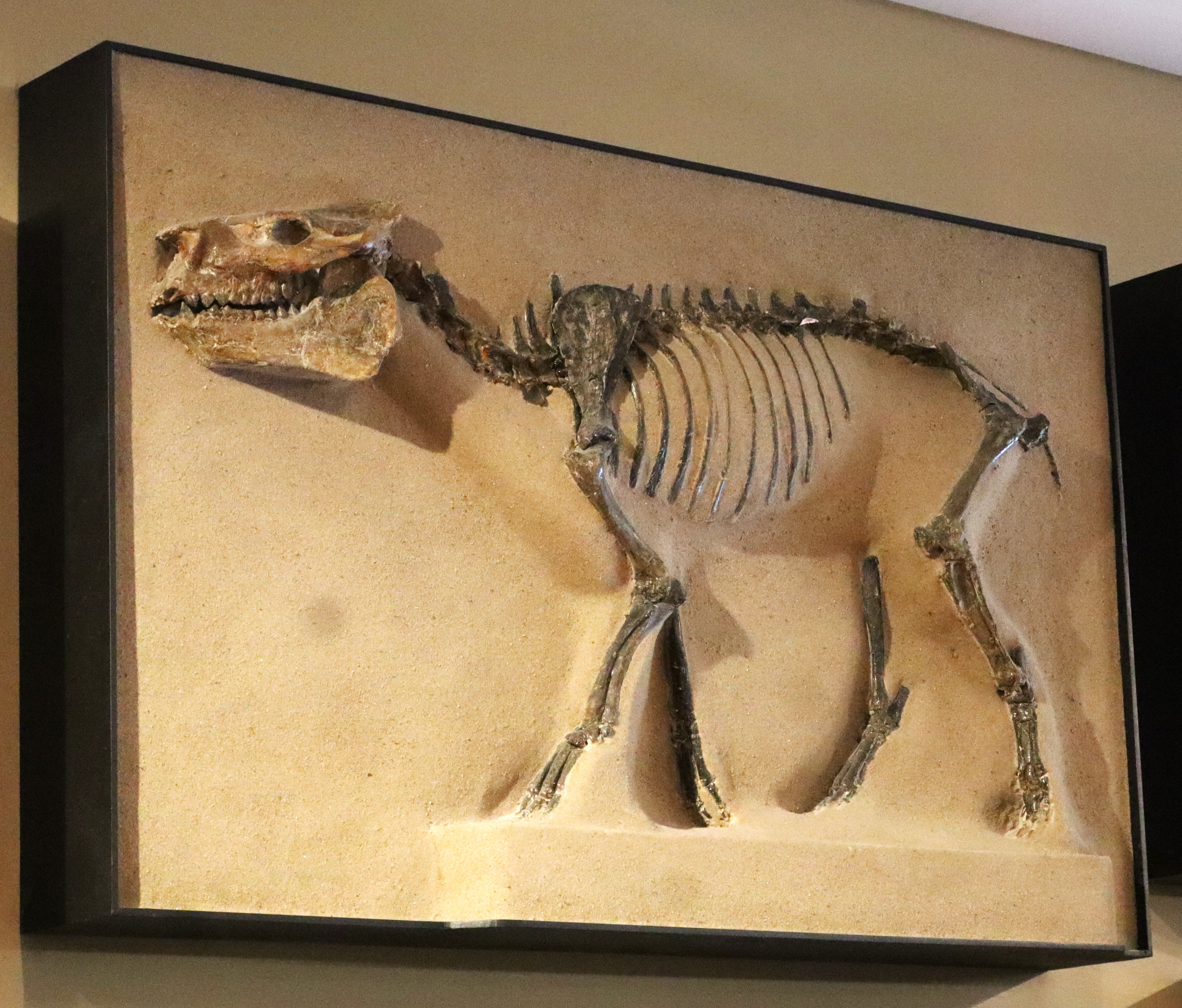
- Skeletal mount of H. breviceps, Beneski Museum of Natural History

Scientific classification
- Kingdom: Animalia
- Phylum: Chordata
- Class: Mammalia
- Infraclass: Placentalia
- Order: Artiodactyla
- Family: †Merycoidodontidae
- Genus: †Hypsiops; Schultz and Falkenbach (1950)

Species
- H. breviceps Douglass 1907; H. erythroceps Stock 1932

= Hypsiops =

Hypsiops Temporal range: Late Oligocene

Extinct genus of mammals

Hypsiops is an extinct genus of oreodont of the family Merycoidodontidae endemic to North America. They lived during the Late Oligocene to Early Miocene epochs, 20.4—16.0 mya, existing for approximately 4 million years. Fossils have been uncovered throughout the western U.S. in Oregon, Montana, Wyoming, and Nebraska.
