= Paroreodon =

Paroreodon Temporal range: Oligocene-Miocene

Scientific classification
- Kingdom: Animalia
- Phylum: Chordata
- Class: Mammalia
- Order: Artiodactyla
- Family: †Merycoidodontidae
- Genus: †Paroreodon; Thorpe (1923)

Species
- see text

Extinct genus of mammals

Paroreodon ("near hill tooth" or "near Oreodon") is an extinct genus of oreodont of the family Merycoidodontidae, subfamily Merycoidodontinae, endemic to North America during the Oligocene-Miocene subepochs (30.8—20.6 mya), existing for approximately 10.2 million years.

== Taxonomy ==
Paroreodon was named by Thorpe (1921). Its type is Paroreodon marshi. It was synonymized subjectively with Oreodontoides by Schultz and Falkenbach in 1947 and assigned to Merycoidodontidae by Thorpe (1921) and Lander (1998).

== Fossil distribution ==
Wheeler County, Oregon.

== Species ==
Paroredon parvus (synonymized with Oreodontoides stocki, Paroredon marshi)
