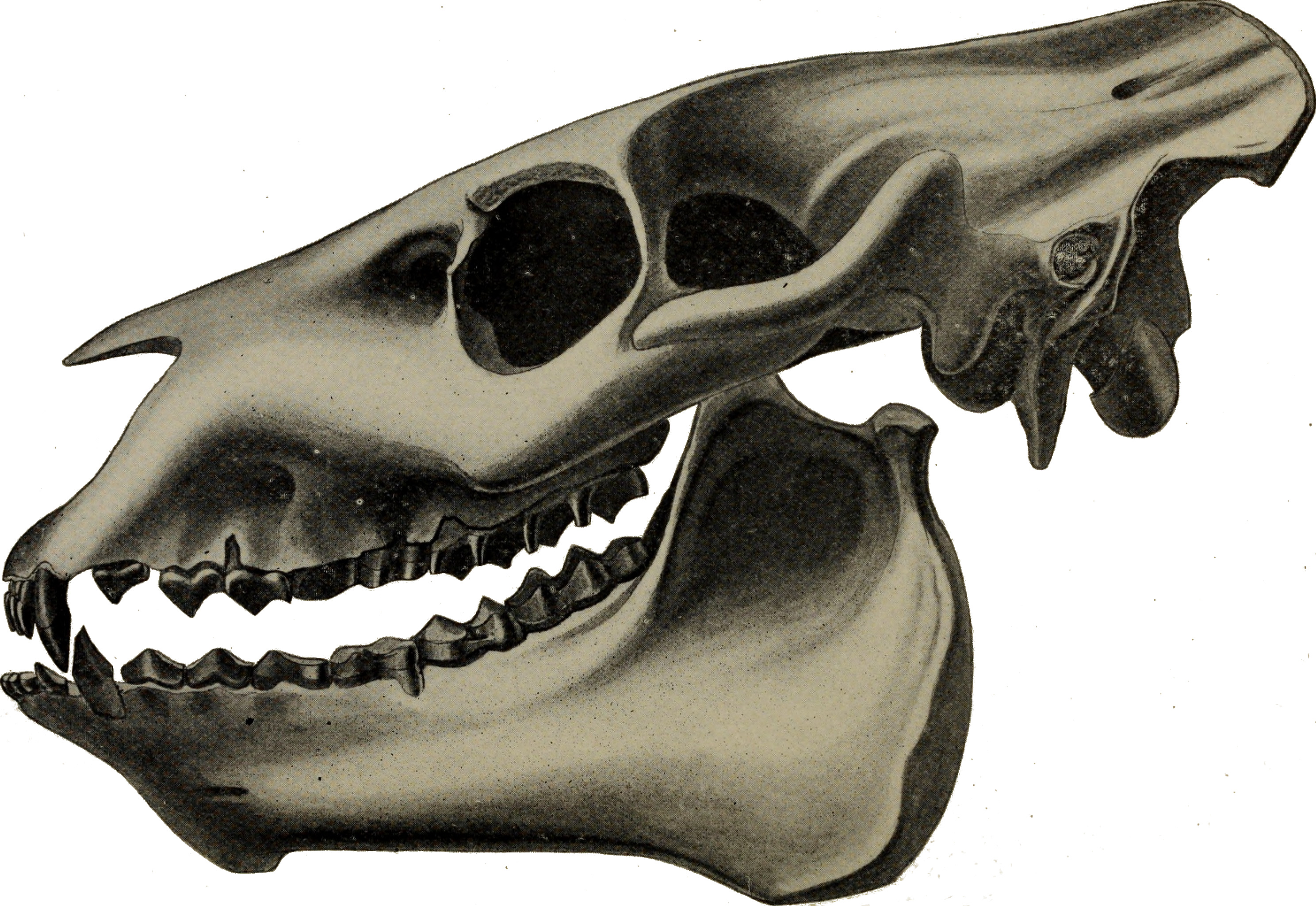
- Merycoides cursor

Scientific classification
- Kingdom: Animalia
- Phylum: Chordata
- Class: Mammalia
- Order: Artiodactyla
- Family: †Merycoidodontidae
- Genus: †Merycoides; Douglass (1907)

Type species
- †Merycoides cursor

Species
- see text

Synonyms
- †Paramerychyus Schultz and Falkenbach 1947

= Merycoides =

Merycoides Temporal range: Late Oligocene

Extinct genus of mammals

Merycoides is an extinct genus of oreodont of the subfamily Merycoidodontinae endemic to North America. It lived during the Oligocene to Late Miocene, 30.8—16.0 mya, existing for approximately 15 million years. Fossils have been uncovered throughout the western U.S. as well as Florida.

== Species ==
- M. cursor Douglass 1907
- M. harrisonensis Schultz & Falkenbach 1949
- M. longiceps Douglass 1907
- M. pariogonus Schultz & Falkenbach 1949
- M. relictus Cope 1884
