= Limnenetes =

Limnenetes Temporal range: Late Eocene

Scientific classification
- Kingdom: Animalia
- Phylum: Chordata
- Class: Mammalia
- Order: Artiodactyla
- Family: †Merycoidodontidae
- Genus: †Limnenetes

Type species
- †Limnenetes platyceps

Species
- L. platyceps

Extinct genus of mammals

Limnenetes is an extinct genus of oreodont, endemic to North America. They lived during the Late Eocene 37.2—33.9 mya, existing for approximately 3 million years. Fossils have been uncovered in Montana and Texas.

Limnenetes was a herbivore with a heavy body, long tail, short feet, and four-toed hooves.
