= Mediochoerus =

Mediochoerus Temporal range: Miocene

Scientific classification
- Kingdom: Animalia
- Phylum: Chordata
- Class: Mammalia
- Order: Artiodactyla
- Family: †Merycoidodontidae
- Genus: †Mediochoerus; Schultz and Falkenbach (1941)

Species
- see text

Extinct genus of mammals

Mediochoerus is an extinct genus of oreodont of the family Merycoidodontidae, subfamily Merycoidodontinae, endemic to North America during the Early Miocene-Middle Miocene subepochs (20.6—13.6 mya), existing for approximately 7 million years.

== Taxonomy ==
Mediochoerus was named by Schultz and Falkenbach (1941) and assigned to Merycoidodontidae by Schultz and Falkenbach (1941) and Lander (1998).

== Fossil distribution ==
Nebraska and California.

== Species ==
M. blicki (type species), M. johnsoni, M. mohavensis
