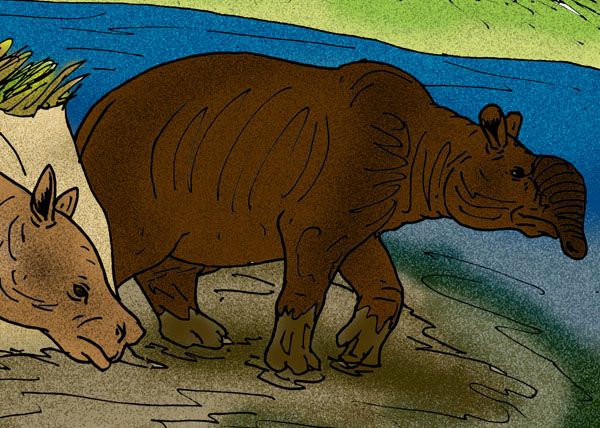
- Brachycrus laticeps

Scientific classification
- Kingdom: Animalia
- Phylum: Chordata
- Class: Mammalia
- Order: Artiodactyla
- Family: †Merycoidodontidae
- Subfamily: †Merycochoerinae
- Genus: †Brachycrus; Matthew, 1901

Type species
- †Merycochoerus rusticus

Species
- B. buwaldi; B. laticeps; B. rusticus; B. siouense; B. sweetwaterensis; B. vaughani

Synonyms
- Pronomotherium Douglass, 1907

= Brachycrus =

Brachycrus Temporal range: Middle Miocene

Extinct genus of mammals

Brachycrus is an extinct genus of oreodont, of the family Merycoidodontidae, endemic to North America. They lived during the Middle Miocene, 16.0—13.6 mya, existing for approximately 2.4 million years.

== Description ==
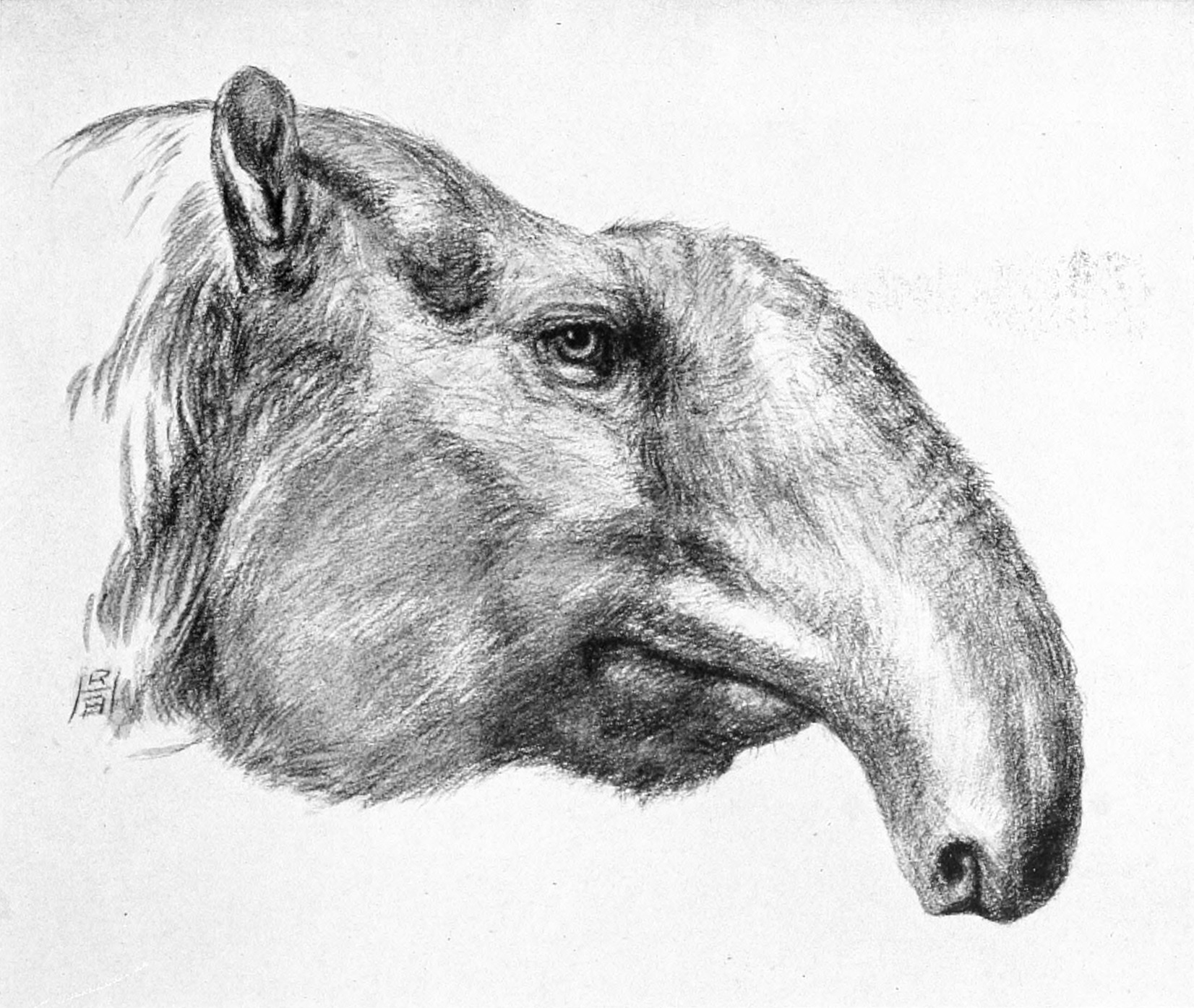
Life restoration of Brachycrus laticeps by Robert Bruce Horsfall

The 1 metre (3.3 ft) long creature resembled its bigger, earlier relative Merycoidodon, but was more specialized. Brachycrus had jaws which were short, and because the nostrils were placed far to the back, the creature is presumed to have had a tapir-like proboscis. The positioning of the eyes on the skull and the tubular ear structure hints that Brahycrus lived a semi-aquatic lifestyle.

== Palaeoecology ==
Dental mesowear shows that B. laticeps had a browsing diet during the late Hemingfordian, but that its diet shifted towards a more mixed feeding diet during the early Barstovian.
