= Desmatochoerus =

Desmatochoerus Temporal range: Late Oligocene–Middle Miocene

Scientific classification
- Kingdom: Animalia
- Phylum: Chordata
- Class: Mammalia
- Order: Artiodactyla
- Family: †Merycoidodontidae
- Genus: †Desmatochoerus; Thorpe 1921

Species
- †D. hesperus; †D. megalodon

Extinct genus of mammals

Desmatochoerus is a large extinct genus of oreodont of the family Merycoidodontidae, endemic to North America. They lived during the Late Oligocene to Middle Miocene 28.4—16.0 mya, existing for approximately 12 million years. Fossils have been uncovered in several locations in the western U.S.
