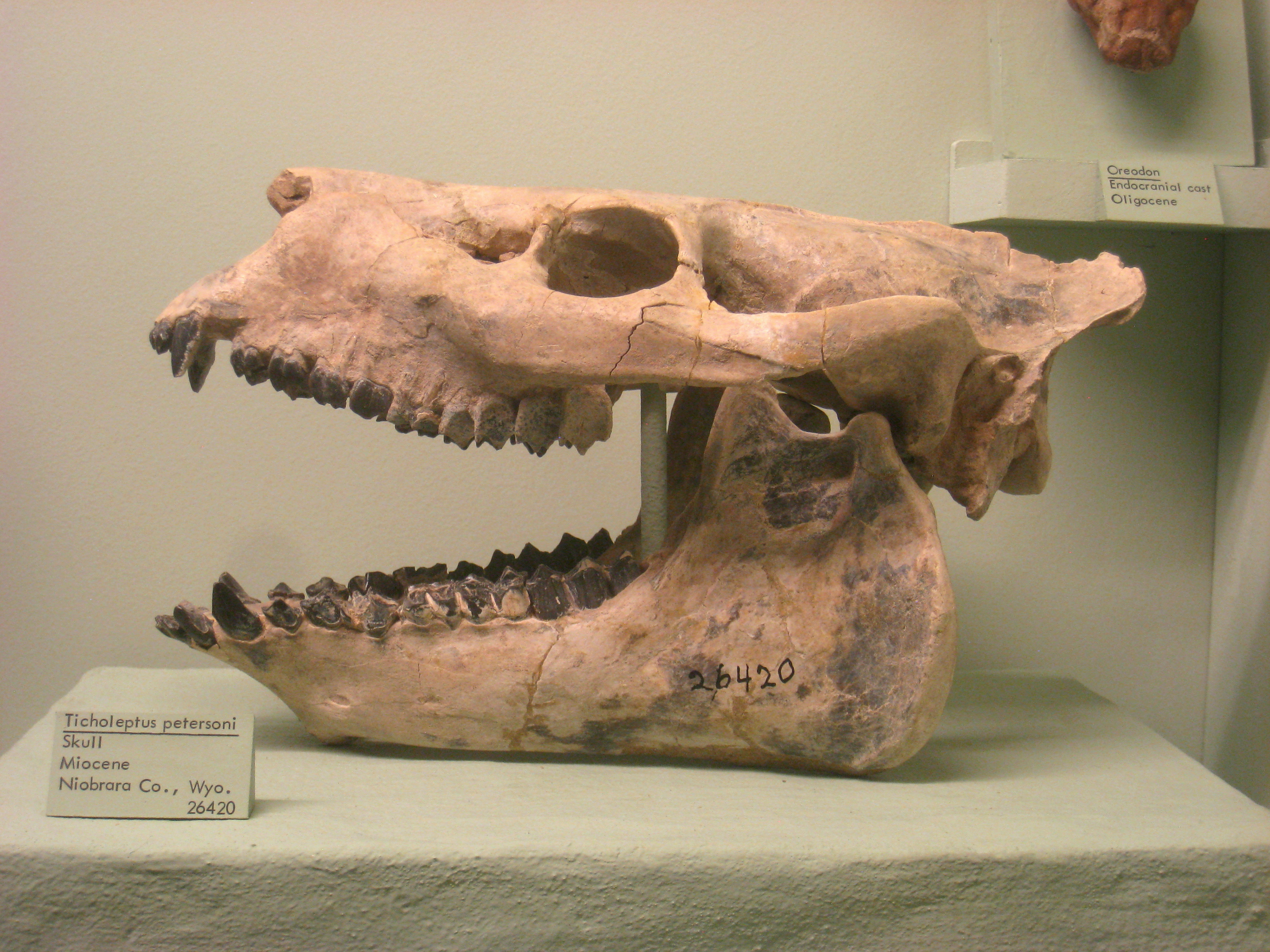
- Ticholeptus petersoni

Scientific classification
- Kingdom: Animalia
- Phylum: Chordata
- Class: Mammalia
- Order: Artiodactyla
- Family: †Merycoidodontidae
- Genus: †Ticholeptus; Cope 1878

Species
- Ticholeptus zygomaticus

= Ticholeptus =

Ticholeptus Temporal range: Middle Miocene

Extinct genus of mammals

Ticholeptus is an extinct genus of oreodont endemic to North America during the Middle Miocene subepoch (16.0—13.6 mya), existing for approximately 2.4 million years. Fossils have been uncovered throughout the United States from Florida to Oregon, as well as California, and numerous sites in Nebraska, Nevada, and Montana.

== Palaeoecology ==
The dental mesowear of Ticholeptus shows that it was a mixed feeder or grazer and that it had one of the most texturally abrasive diets of any oreodont taxon.
