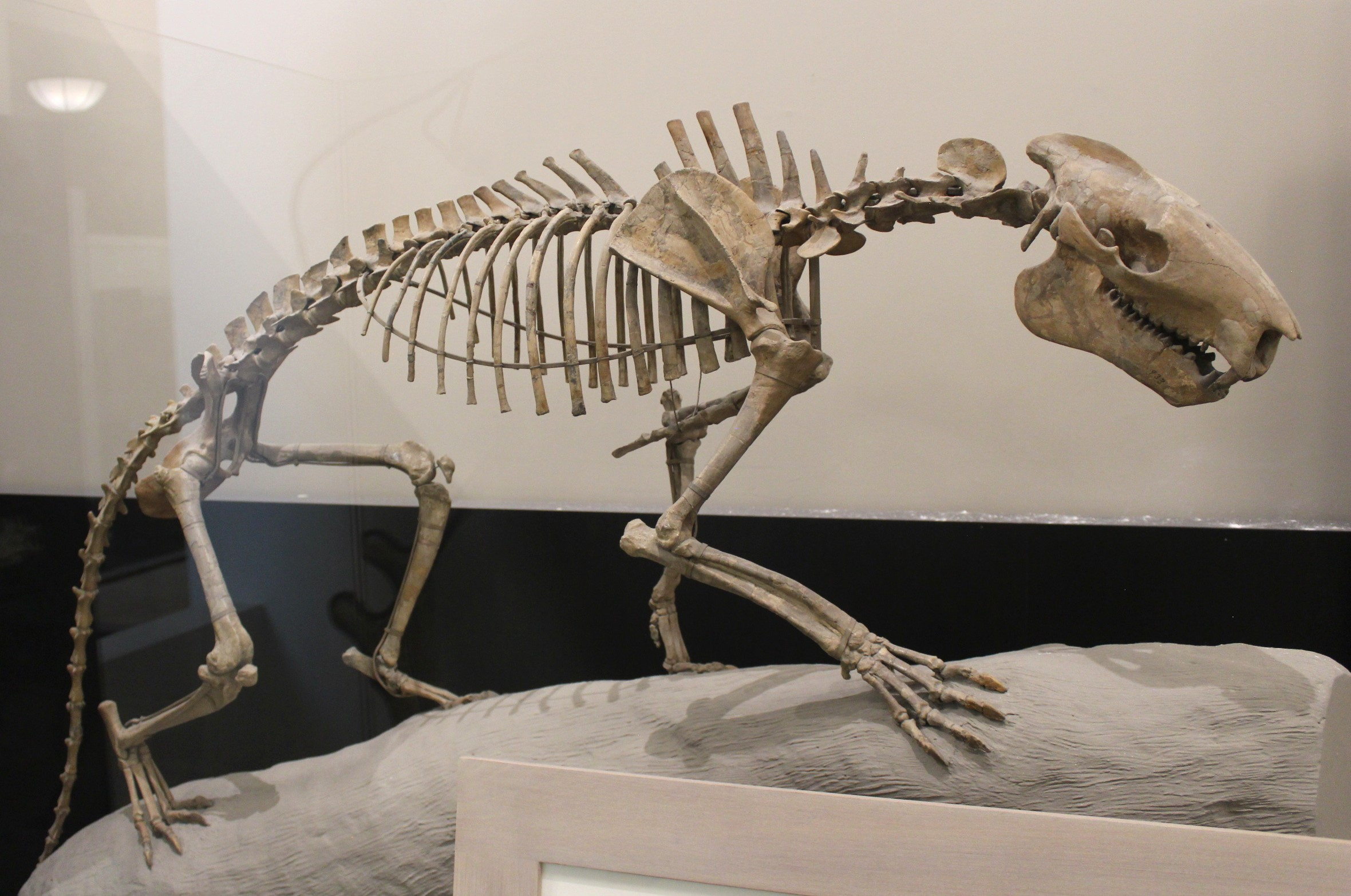
- A. antiquus skeleton at the American Museum of Natural History

Scientific classification
- Kingdom: Animalia
- Phylum: Chordata
- Class: Mammalia
- Order: Artiodactyla
- Family: †Agriochoeridae
- Genus: †Agriochoerus; Leidy, 1850

Species
- A. antiquus; A. crassus; A. gaudryi; A. guyotianus; A. major; A. maximus; A. minimus; A. transmontanus?

= Agriochoerus =

Agriochoerus Temporal range: Late Eocene-Oligocene 40.4–20.43 Ma

Extinct genus of mammals

Agriochoerus is an extinct genus of scansorial herbivore of the tylopod family Agriochoeridae, endemic to North America. Agriochoerus and other agriochoerids possessed claws, which is rare within Artiodactyla, as well as likely being scansorial. Agriochoerus was first described in 1869.

Agriochoerus lived during the late Eocene and the Oligocene. It was medium-sized, the estimated body mass for A. antiquus being about 85 kilograms (187 lb).

== Description ==
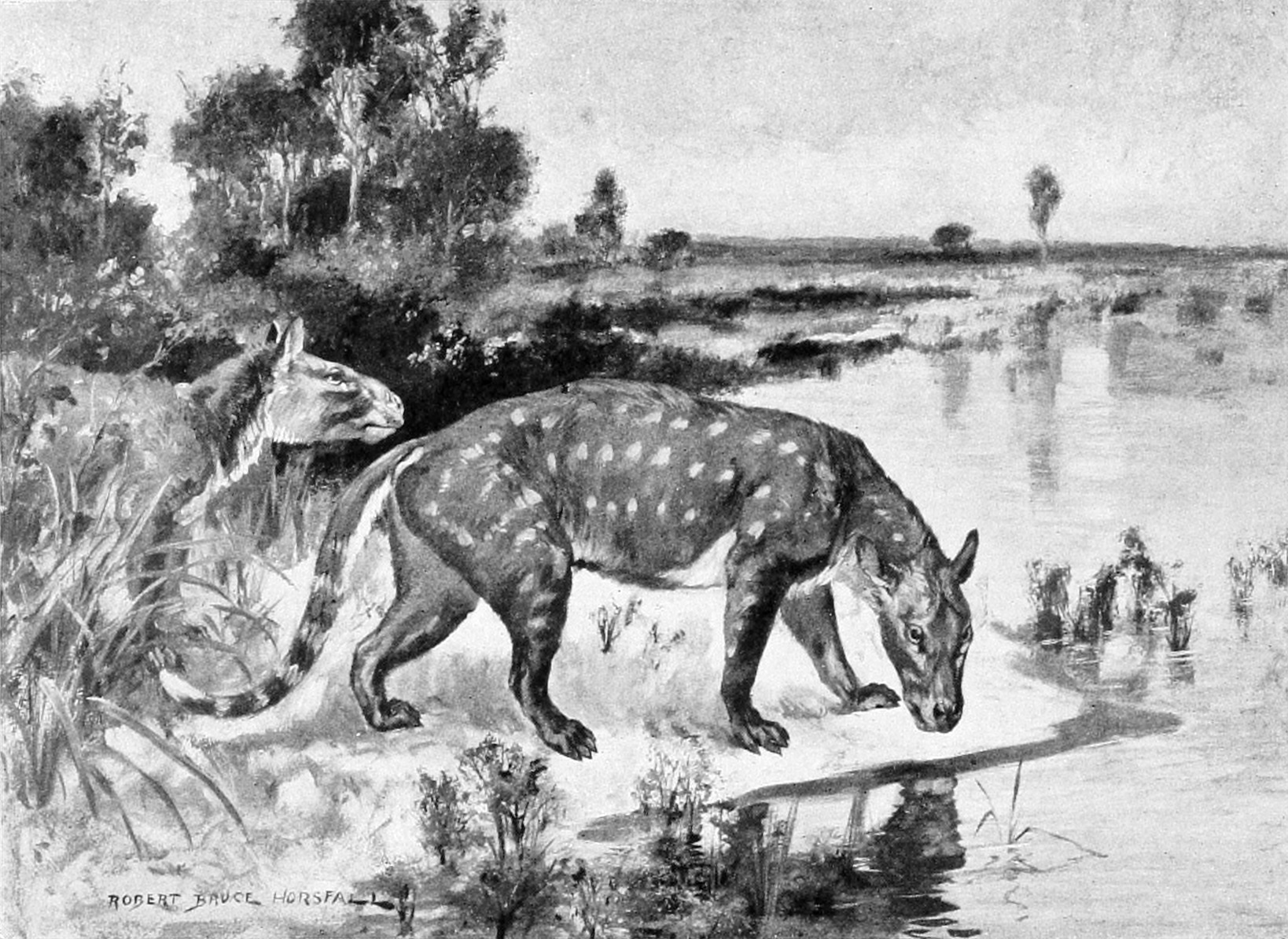
Life reconstruction of Agriochoerus antiquus

Agriochoerus was about the size of a sheep, weighing around 85 kilograms. Like other agriochoerids, it possessed a body shape unusual for an artiodactyl. The body was rather elongated and supported by more elongated and slender limbs than those of others within the Merycoidodontoidea. The front legs were five-toed, with an atrophied thumb, while the hind legs had only four toes. The tail was long and heavy. Another unusual characteristic for the artiodactyls was the presence of true claws, as confirmed by the shape of the phalanges. The skull was long and thin, but the muzzle was rather short. There were two robust upper canines; these teeth were separated from the premolars by a long diastema; the incisors were very small. The last lower premolar had become identical to a true molar, while the upper one was nearly molar. This phenomenon is rare in artiodactyls, but is found in Dichodon, where the fourth premolar is more complex than the molars. The elongated trunk was equipped with lumbar vertebrae similar to those of cats; the legs also resembled those of the felids. The distal end of the humerus, with its lower trochlea and the capitellum similar to that of Anoplotheriidae, indicates freedom of movement similar to that present within the Cainotheriidae.

== Classification ==
The genus Agriochoerus was described for the first time in 1850 by Joseph Leidy; the type species is Agriochoerus antiquus, whose fossils have been found in Eocene and Oligocene sediments of Nebraska, South Dakota, Texas and Saskatchewan. Other species attributed to the same genus are A. gaudryi, A. guyotianus, A. crassus, A. major, A. maximus, and A. minimus, all coming from the Eocene–Oligocene of North America. Agriochoerus is the eponymous genus of the Agriochoeridae, a group of artiodactyl mammals similar to Merycoidodontidae, but distinguishable from the latter for a series of characteristics of the skeleton and of the dentition. Agriochoerus appears to have been the most specialized agriochoerid.

== Paleoecology ==
The morphology of the teeth indicates that Agriochoerus shows that this animal was herbivorous, even if the "feline" skeletal anatomy and the presence of claws (as opposed to hooves) are more reminiscent of carnivores. Some scholars have hypothesized that Agriochoerus was able to climb trees, due to the presence of strong claws; other scholars have proposed that Agriochoerus was able to dig burrows or excavate roots to feed on. Based on its high tooth enamel δ^{13}C values, A. antiquus lived in open, dry environments.

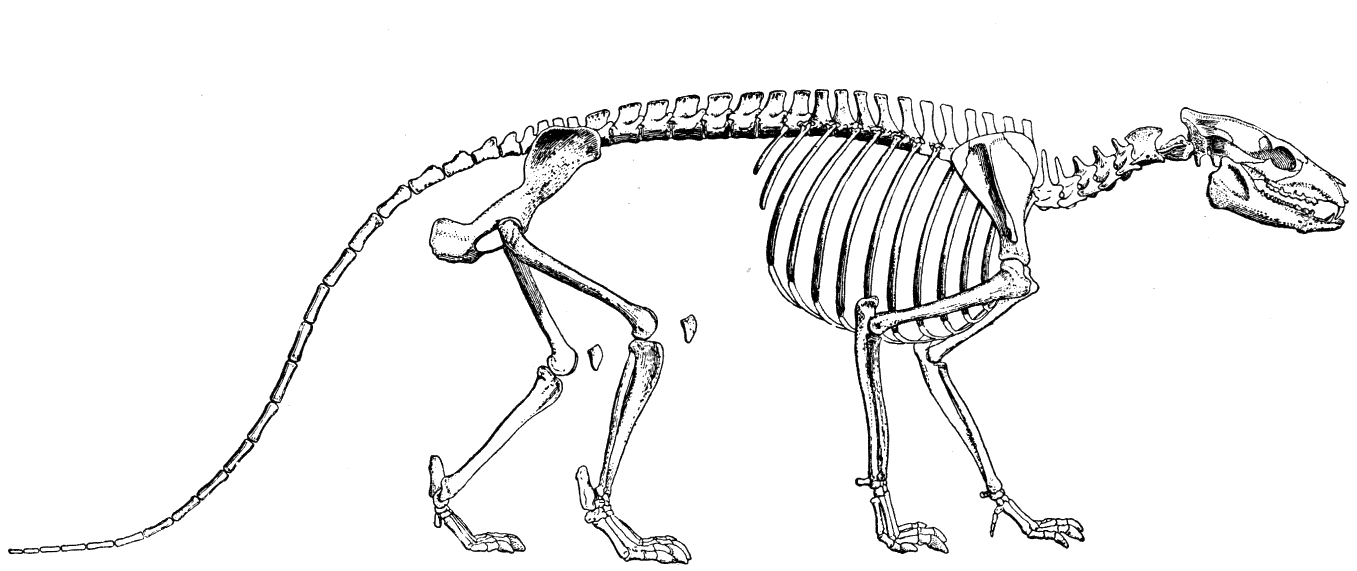
Skeletal reconstruction of Agriochoerus
