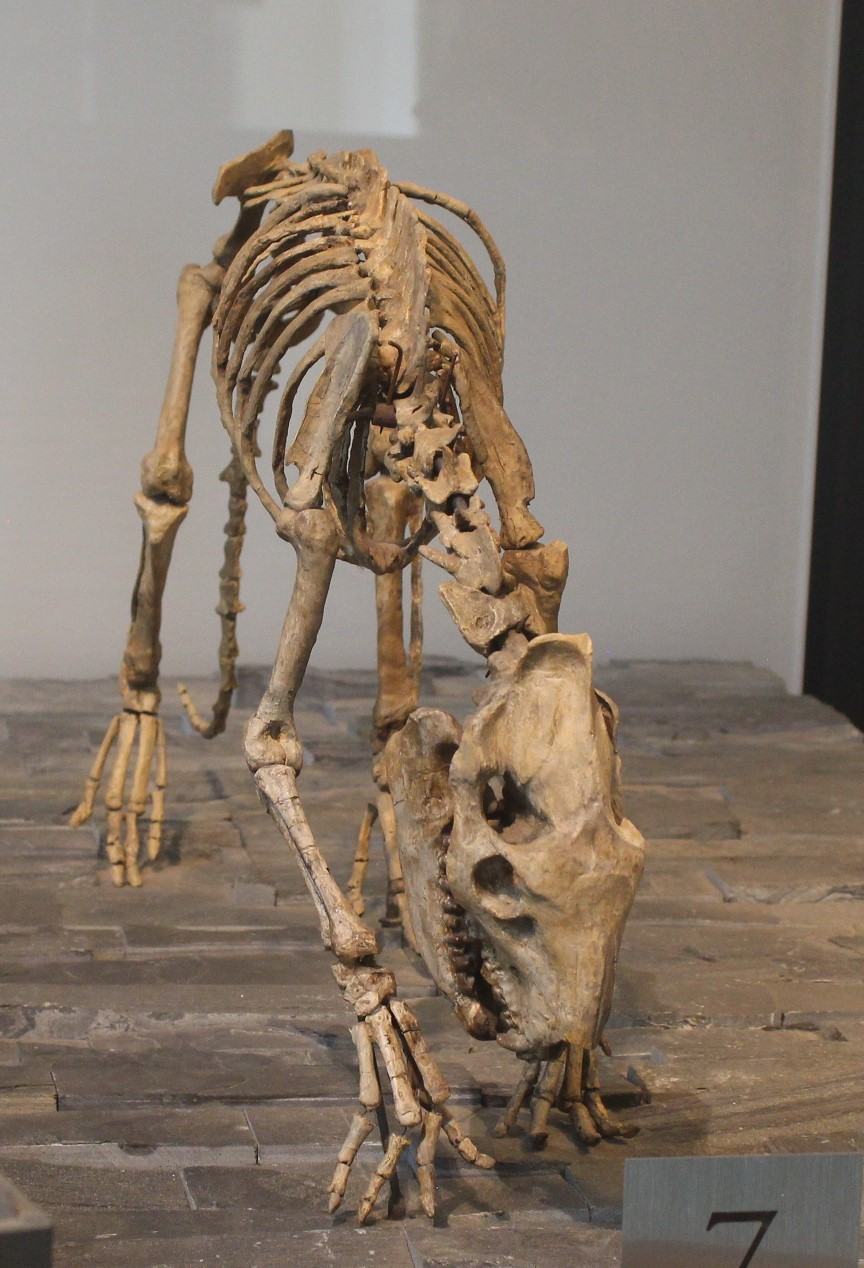
- M. gracilis skeleton, Natural History Museum of Los Angeles

Scientific classification
- Kingdom: Animalia
- Phylum: Chordata
- Class: Mammalia
- Order: Artiodactyla
- Family: †Merycoidodontidae
- Subfamily: †Miniochoerinae
- Genus: †Miniochoerus; Schultz and Falkenbach, 1956

Type species
- †Miniochoerus battlecreekensis

Species
- See text

Synonyms
- Paraminiochoerus Schultz and Falkenbach, 1956; Parastenopsochoerus Schultz and Falkenbach, 1956; Platyochoerus Schultz and Falkenbach, 1956; Pseudostenopsochoerus Schultz and Falkenbach, 1956; Stenopsochoerus Schultz and Falkenbach, 1956

= Miniochoerus =

Miniochoerus Temporal range: Late Eocene–Early Oligocene

Extinct genus of mammals

Miniochoerus is an extinct genus of small oreodont endemic to North America. They lived during the Late Eocene to Early Oligocene 38–30.8 mya, existing for approximately 7 million years. Fossils have been found only in North Dakota, South Dakota, Nebraska, Montana, and Wyoming.

== Species ==
- M. affinis (syn. Merycoidodon platycephalus, M. battlecreekensis, Oreodon coloradoensis, Stenopsochoerus sternbergi)
- M. chadronensis (syn. Parastenopsochoerus conversensis, Stenopsochoerus douglasensis, S. reideri)
- M. forsythae
- M. gracilis
- M. starkensis (syn. M. cheyennensis, M. helprini, M. nicholsae, M. ottensi, Platyochoerus hatcreekensis, P. heartensis, Stenopsochoerus berardae, S. joderensis)

== Description ==
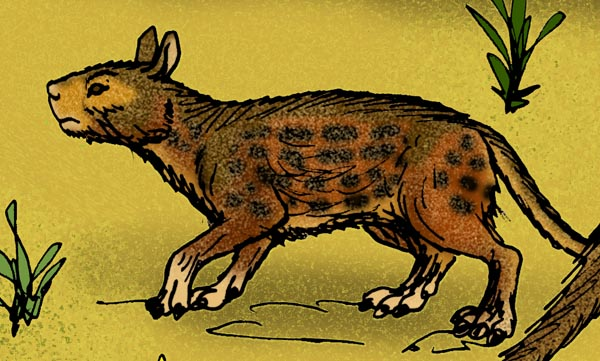
Restoration

Typically, there were about the size of a small dog. Their skulls were small and short, compared to other oreodont species, many of which had proportionately large heads. Unlike other oreodont species, they had small canines which would have done little good against foes. The genus arose during the late Eocene, and survived the Late Eocene extinction event, giving rise to a dwarfed lineage during the early Oligocene.
