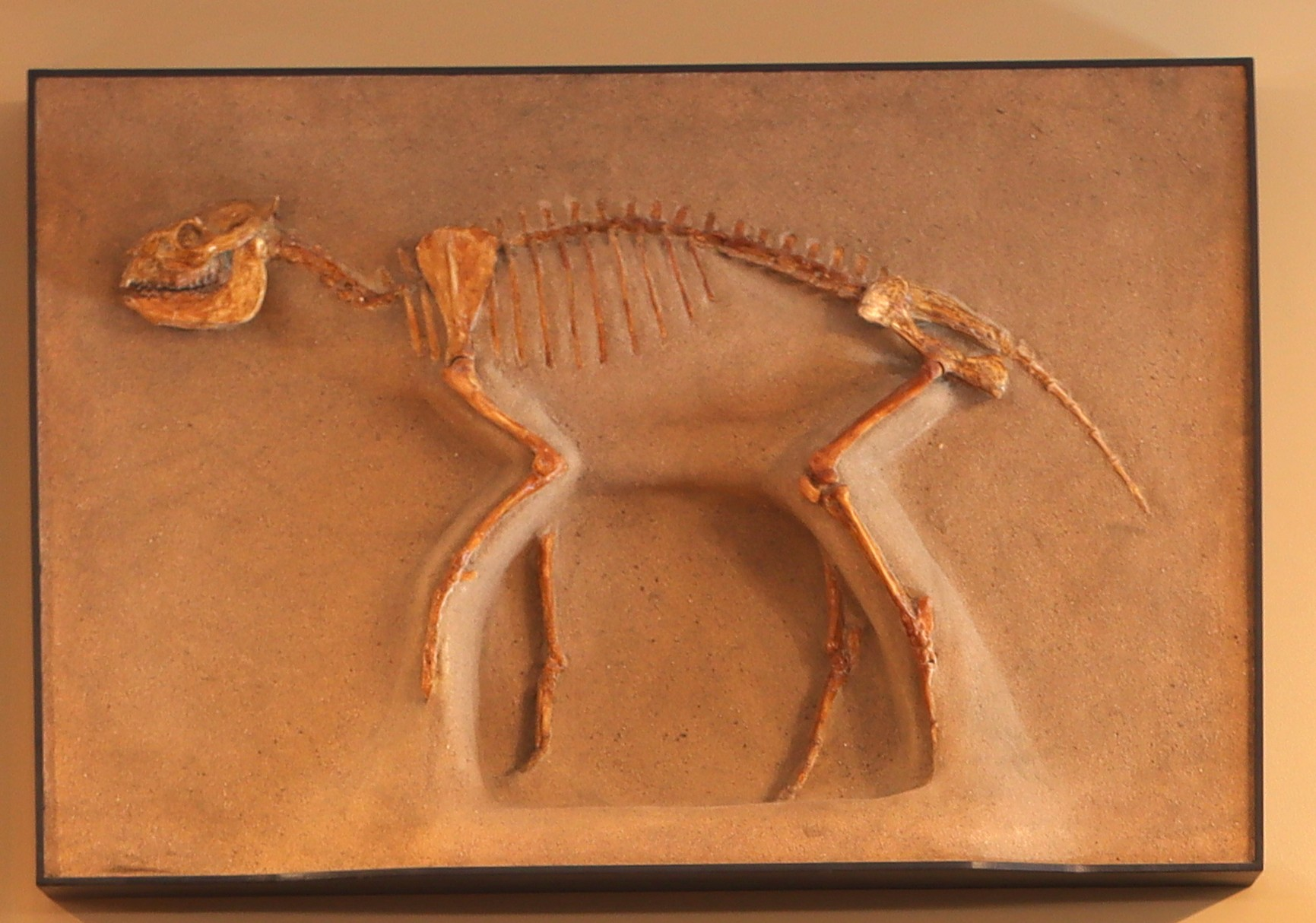
- Skeletal mount of O. curtus, Beneski Museum of Natural History

Scientific classification
- Kingdom: Animalia
- Phylum: Chordata
- Class: Mammalia
- Infraclass: Placentalia
- Order: Artiodactyla
- Family: †Merycoidodontidae
- Genus: †Oreodontoides; Thorpe (1923)

Species
- Oreodontoides oregonensis

= Oreodontoides =

Oreodontoides Temporal range: Late Oligocene–Early Miocene

Extinct genus of mammals

Oreodontoides is an extinct genus of oreodont of the family Merycoidodontidae endemic to North America. It lived during the Late Oligocene to Early Miocene (24.8—20.4 mya), existing for approximately 5 million years. Fossils have been uncovered throughout the western U.S. including at sites in Oregon, Wyoming, and South Dakota.
