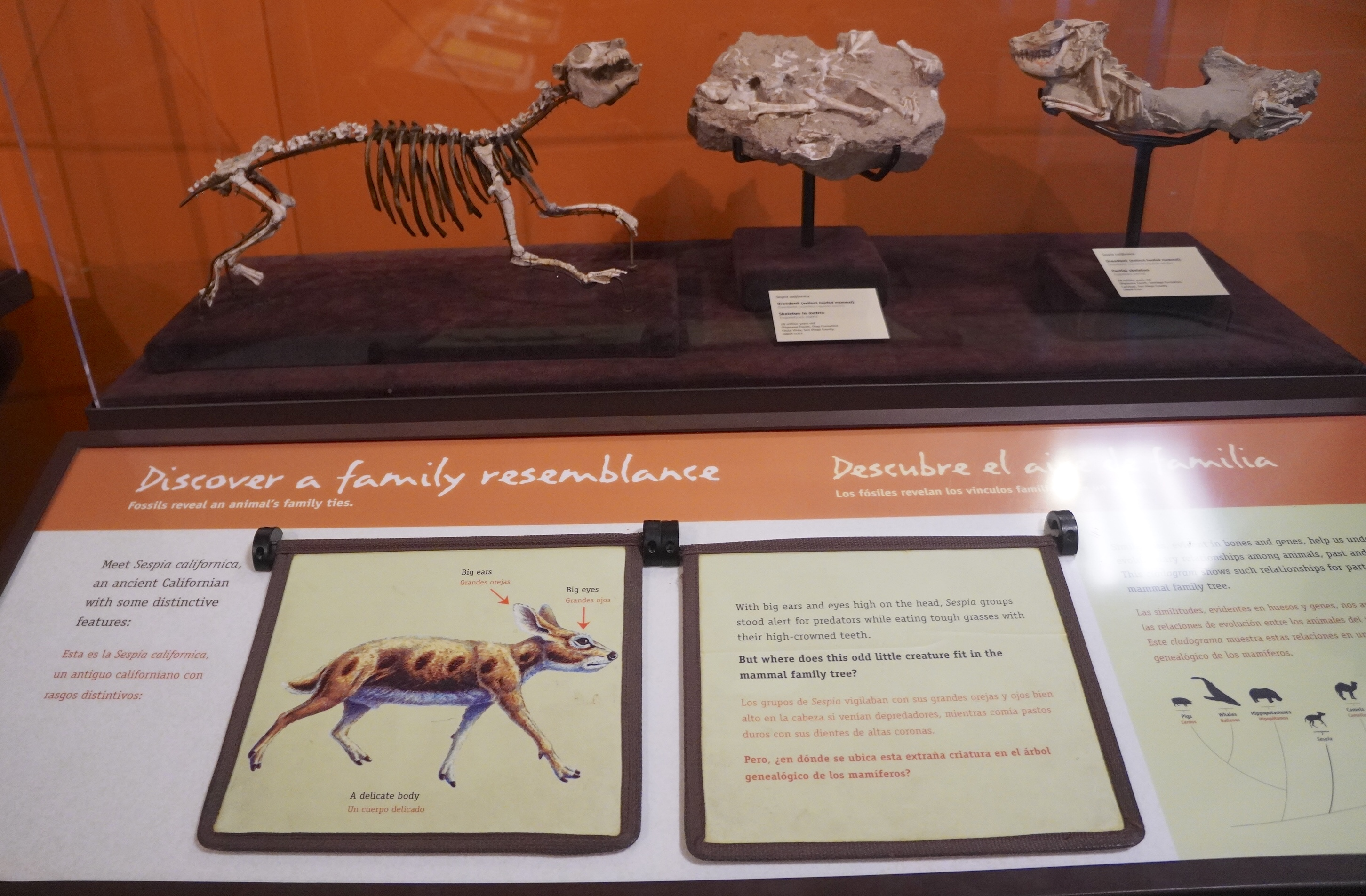
- Sespia californica fossils in San Diego

Scientific classification
- Kingdom: Animalia
- Phylum: Chordata
- Class: Mammalia
- Infraclass: Placentalia
- Order: Artiodactyla
- Family: †Merycoidodontidae
- Tribe: †Sespiini
- Genus: †Sespia; Stock, 1930

Type species
- †Leptauchenia nitida

Species
- †S. nitida; †S. californica; †S. heterodon; †S. ultima

Synonyms
- †Megasespia Schultz and Falkenbach, 1968

= Sespia =

Sespia Temporal range: Late Oligocene

Genus of mammals (fossil)

Sespia ("of Sespe Creek") is an extinct genus of oreodont endemic to North America. They lived during the Late Oligocene 26.3—24.8 mya, existing for approximately 1.5 million years. Sespia was cat to goat-sized and desert-dwelling. The genus was closely related to the larger Leptauchenia.

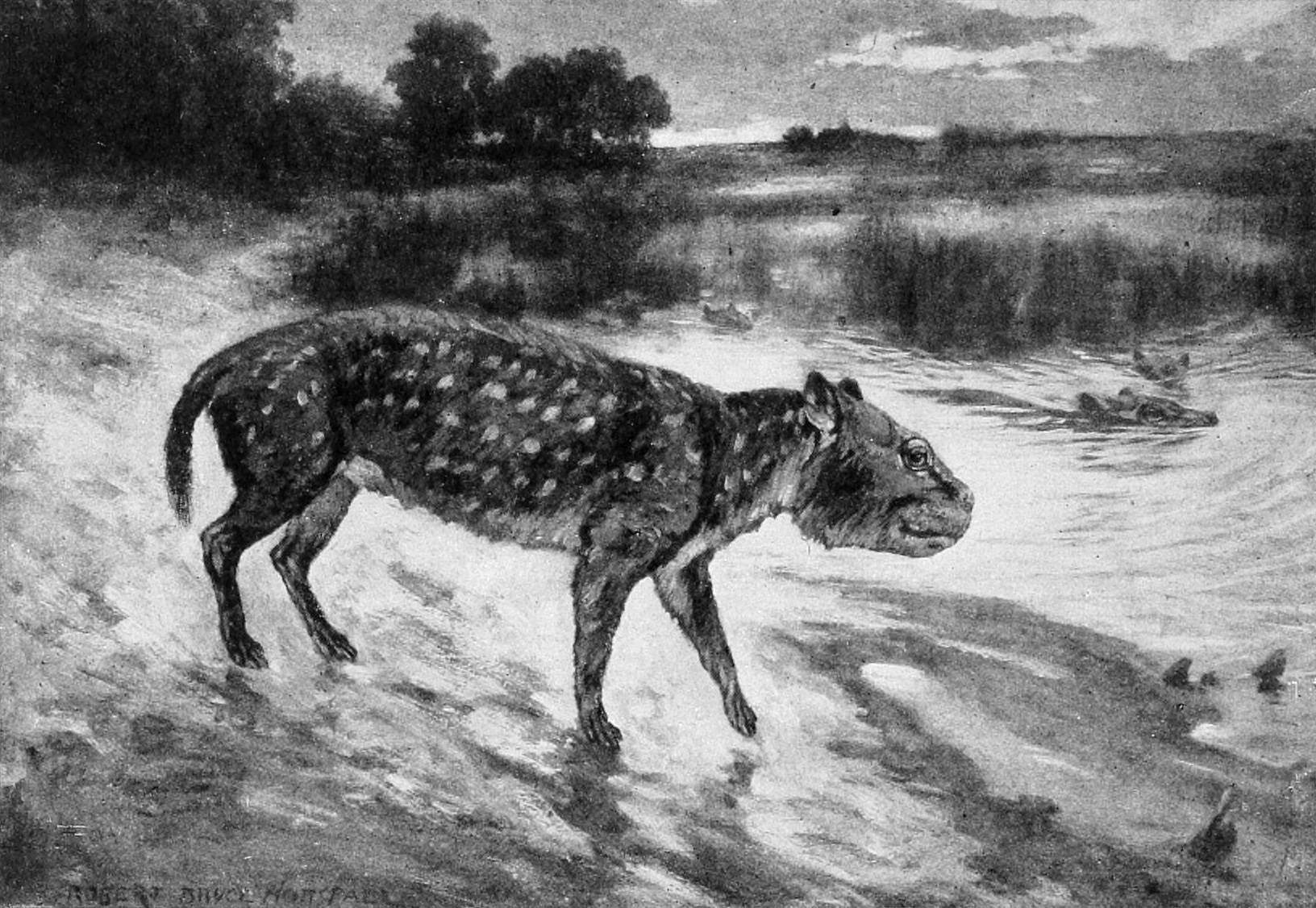
Restoration of S. nitida as a semi-aquatic animal, 1913

Fossils of the best known species, the cat-sized S. californica, have been found in California and are known from literally thousands of specimens. The largest species, the goat-sized S. ultima, is known from Late Oligocene deposits in Nebraska. S. ultima was once placed in a separate monotypic genus as Megasespia middleswarti. Other species were once placed within Leptauchenia.

== Palaeoecology ==
Paired analysis of its dental mesowear and microwear suggests that S. nitida was a folivorous browser.
