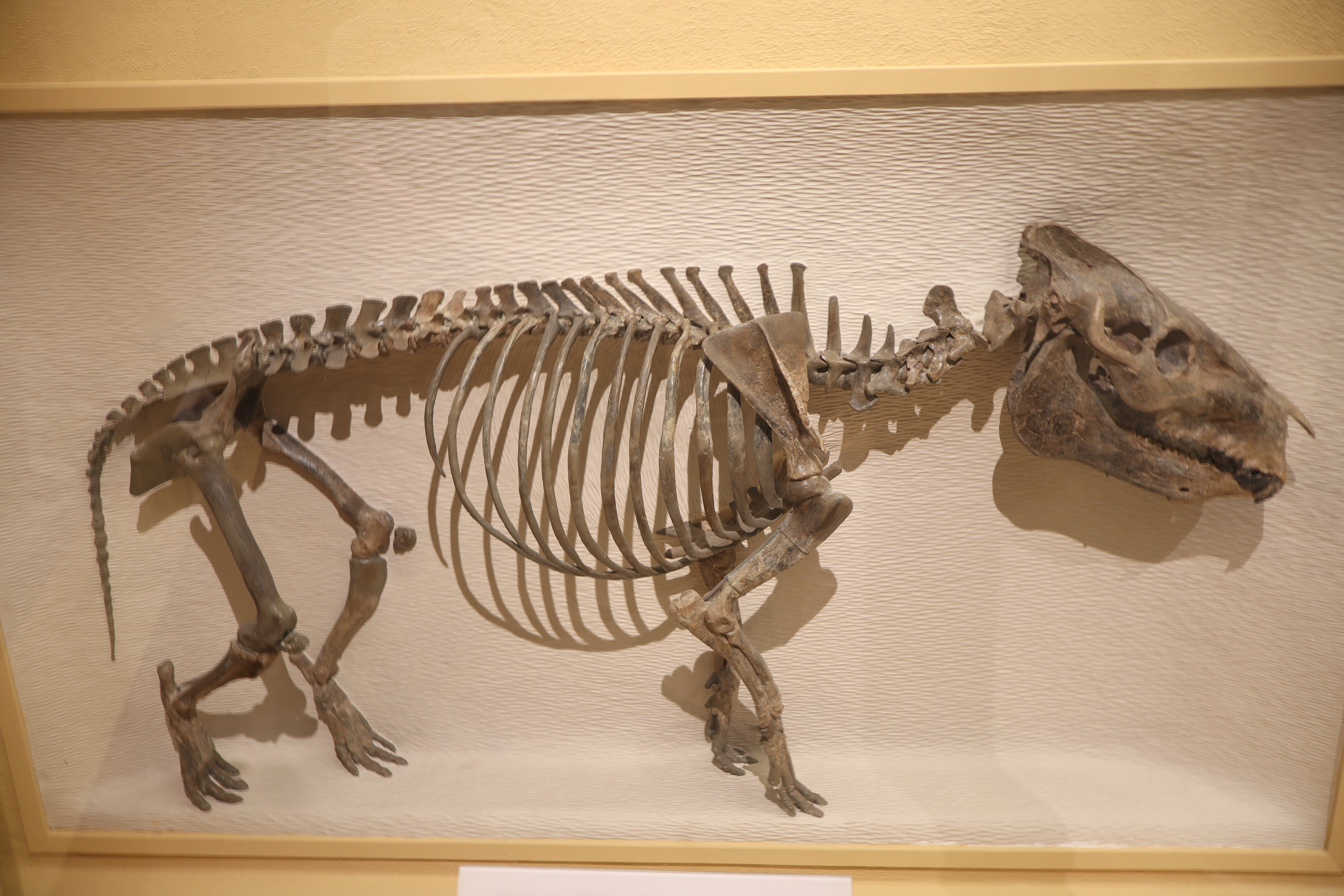
- Skeletal mount of M. superbus, Harvard Museum of Natural History

Scientific classification
- Kingdom: Animalia
- Phylum: Chordata
- Class: Mammalia
- Order: Artiodactyla
- Family: †Merycoidodontidae
- Genus: †Merycochoerus; Leidy 1858

Type species
- †Merychochoerus proprius

Species
- see text

Synonyms
- Megoreodon; Paracotylops; Promerycochoerus; Superdesmatochoerus

= Merycochoerus =

Merycochoerus Temporal range: Early Oligocene 34–31 Ma

Extinct genus of mammals

Merycochoerus (Greek: "ruminant" (merux)-like "swine" (khoiros)) is an extinct genus of oreodont of the family Merycoidodontidae, endemic to North America. They lived during the Early Oligocene 33.9—30.8 mya, existing for approximately 3 million years. Fossils are widespread through the western United States.

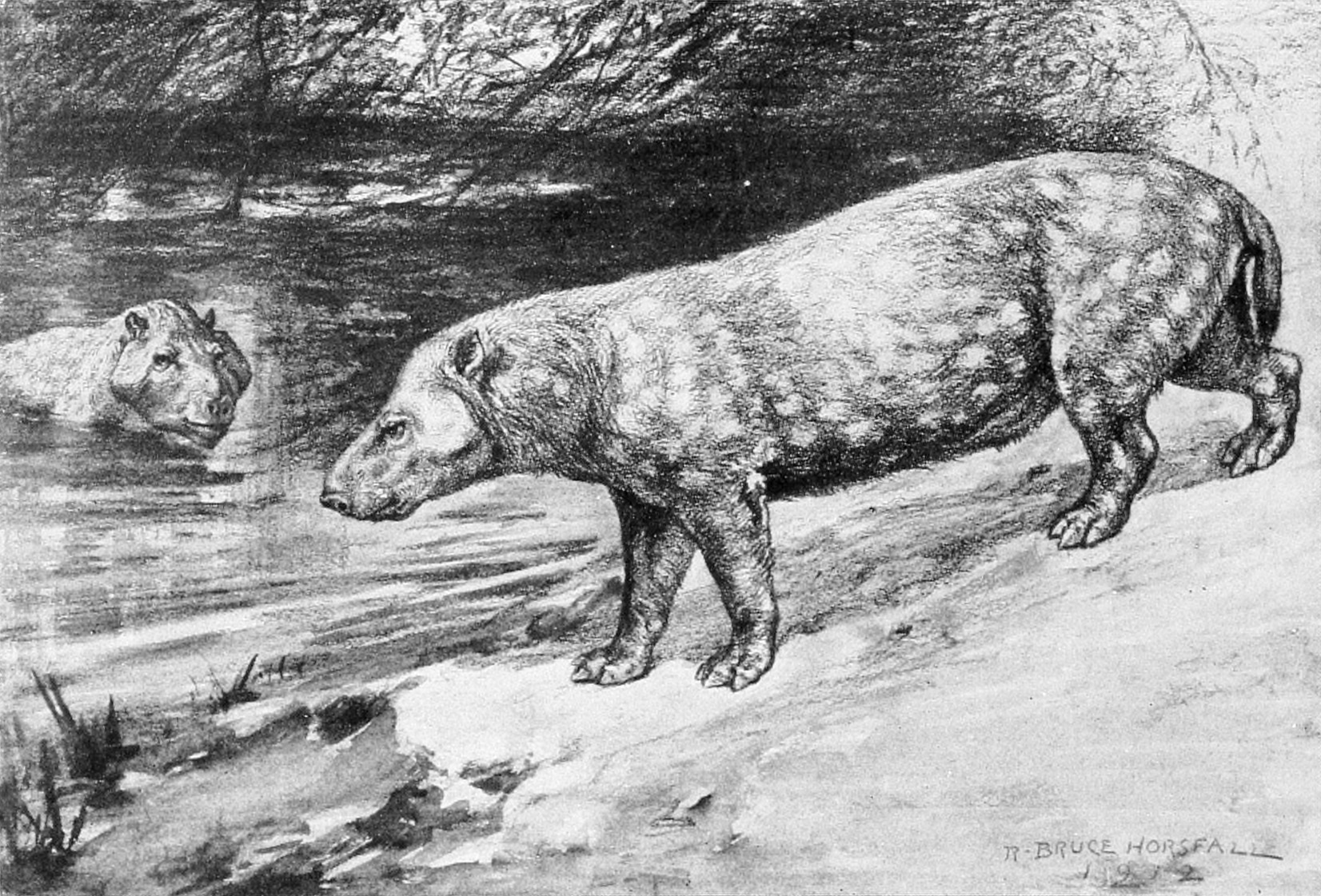
Restoration of M. carrikeri by Robert Bruce Horsfall

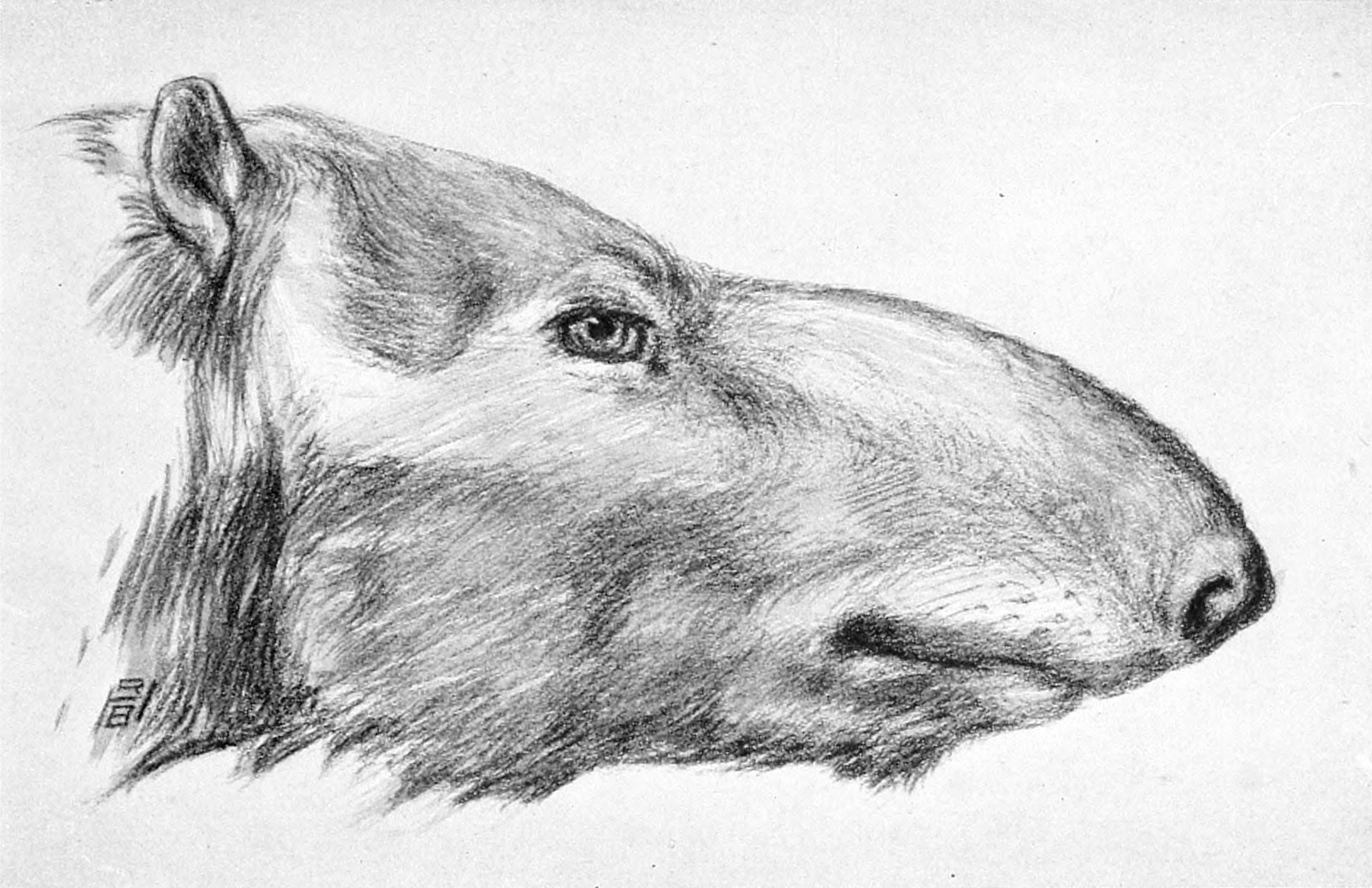
Restoration of M. proprius

Merycochoerus was a cud-chewing plant-eater with a long face, tusk-like canine teeth, heavy body, long tail, short feet, and four-toed hooves. The 1 metre (3.3 ft) long animals are thought to have been amphibious, as members of the genus possessed an elongated, barrel-shaped body and short limbs that are typical adaptations found in semi-aquatic mammals.

== Species ==
- M. carrikeri (syn. Promerycochoerus thomsoni)
- M. chelydra (syn. Promerycochoerus barbouri)
- M. magnus
- M. matthewi
- M. pinensis
- M. proprius
- M. superbus (syn. M. fricki, M. leidyi, M. macrostegus, M. montanus, M. temporalis, Promerycochoerus grandis, P. hatcheri, P. hollandi, P. inflatus, P. latidens, P. loomisi, P. lulli, P. marshi, P. microcephalus)
- M. vantasselensis
