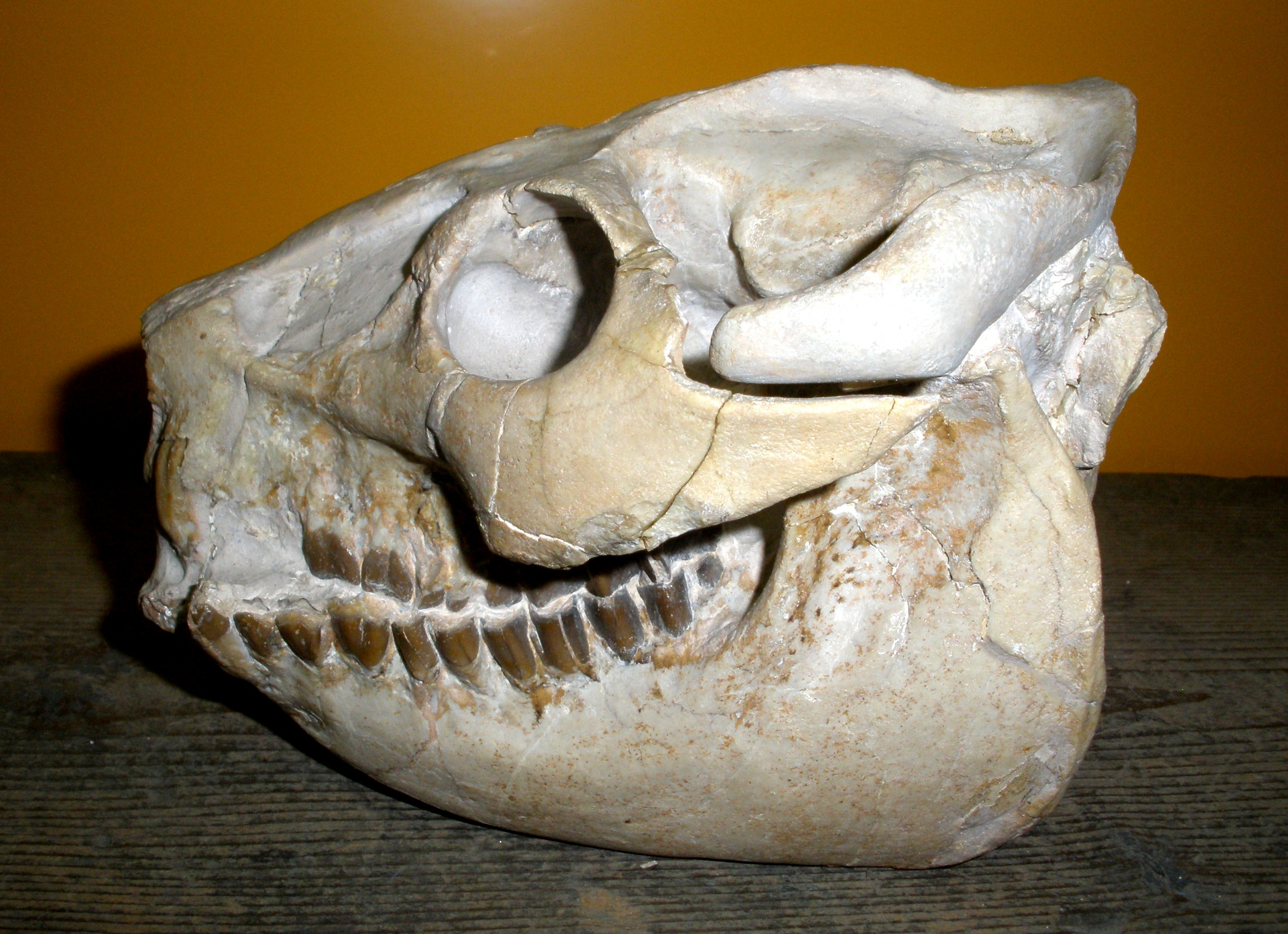
- Leptauchenia decora skull

Scientific classification
- Kingdom: Animalia
- Phylum: Chordata
- Class: Mammalia
- Order: Artiodactyla
- Family: †Merycoidodontidae
- Tribe: †Leptaucheniini
- Genus: †Leptauchenia; Leidy, 1856

Type species
- †Leptauchenia decora Leidy, 1856

Species
- see text

Synonyms
- Brachymeryx; Cyclopidius; Hadroleptauchenia; Pithecistes; Pseudocyclopidius

= Leptauchenia =

Leptauchenia Temporal range: Late Oligocene - Early Miocene

Extinct genus of mammals

Leptauchenia is an extinct goat-like genus of terrestrial herbivore belonging to the oreodont family Merycoidodontidae, and the type genus of the tribe Leptaucheniini. The genus was endemic to North America during the Late Oligocene to Early Miocene (33.9—16.3 mya) and lived for approximately 17.6 million years.

== Morphology ==
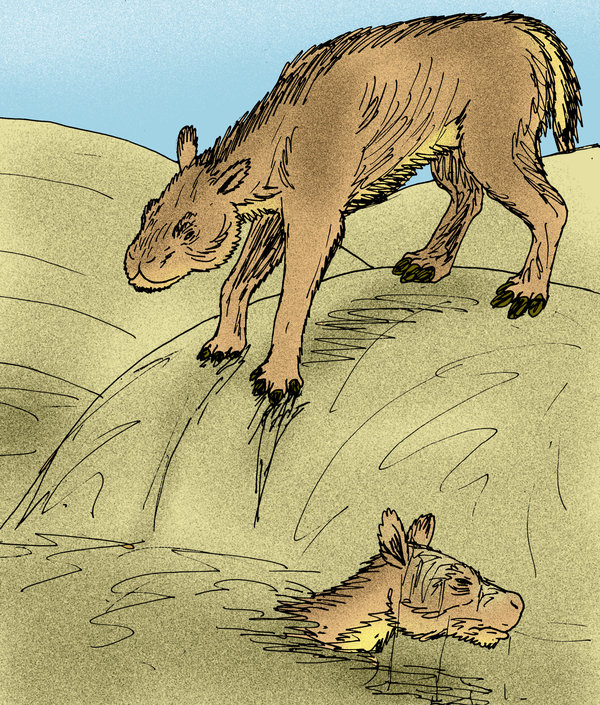
Artist's reconstruction of Leptauchenia decora

Because the eyes and nostrils were placed high on the head, it was long assumed that Leptauchenia was an aquatic, or semi-aquatic animal. However, because their fossils have never been found in floodplain deposits or river channels, and their abundance in fossil sand dunes, Donald Prothero suggests that they were desert-dwelling animals. According to Prothero's interpretation, the high-placed eyes and nostrils served to filter out sand while burrowing, or while digging themselves free of sand dunes.

== Fossil distribution ==
Skeletons of Leptauchenia have been found by the thousands and in greater numbers than the related genus Sespia, it is often quoted as being the most numerous mammal in North America during the Late Oligocene. It had high-crowned, hypsodont teeth which were used to chew gritty vegetation.

== Palaeoecology ==
Dental microwear suggests that L. decora was a regional mixed feeder.

== Species ==
- L. brevifacies (syn. Pithecistes decedens)
- L. decora (type species) (syn. Hadroleptauchenia primitiva, Leptauchenia harveyi, Pithecistes breviceps, Pithecistes facies, Pithecistes tanneri, Pseudocyclopidius frankforteri)
- L. eiselyi
- L. major (syn. Brachymeryx feliceps, Cyclopidius emydinus, Cyclopidius incisivus, Cyclopidius lullianus, Cyclopidius simus, Hadroleptauchenia extrema, Hadroleptauchenia shanafeltae, L. densa, L. margeryae, L. martini, L. parasimus, Pithecistes altageringensis, Pithecistes copei)
- L. orellaensis
