= Protemnocyon =

Protemnocyon Temporal range: Early Oligocene

Scientific classification
- Kingdom: Animalia
- Phylum: Chordata
- Class: Mammalia
- Order: Carnivora
- Family: Canidae
- Genus: †Protemnocyon; Hatcher, 1901
- Species: †P. inflatus

Binomial name
- †Protemnocyon inflatus Hatcher, 1902

Extinct genus of carnivores

Protemnocyon inflatus is a prehistoric species of mammal in the family Canidae. There is only one known species in the genus Protemnocyon.

== Description ==
Protemnocyon inflatus lived in the early stage of Oligocene era about 33.9-33.3 million years ago. Its fossils were discovered at Cedar Creek (Hat Creek Basin) in Nebraska, United States. Its type is classified as CM 552.

== Sources ==
- Fossilworks: Protemnocyon
- J. B. Hatcher. 1902. Oligocene Canidae. Memoirs of the Carnegie Museum 1(3):65-106
- emnocyon definition/meaning - Omnilexica
- A Systematic Revision of Daphoenus and Some Allied Genera - jstor
