= List of the Cenozoic life of Texas =

This list of the Cenozoic life of Texas contains the various prehistoric life-forms whose fossilized remains have been reported from within the US state of Texas and are between 66 million and 10,000 years of age.

== A ==
- †Abdounia
  - †Abdounia enniskilleni
  - †Abdounia recticona
- Abra
  - †Abra nitens
  - †Abra petropolitana
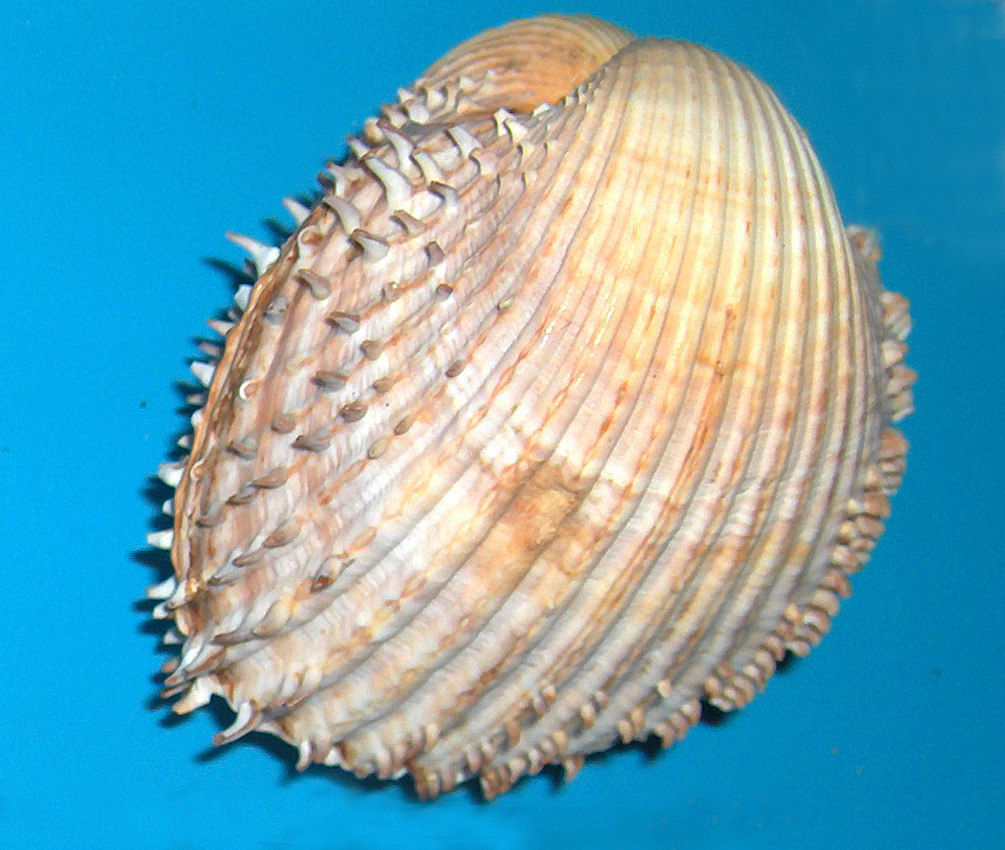
- Shell of an Acanthocardia cockle
  Acanthocardia
  - †Acanthocardia tuomeyi
- Acar
  - †Acar aspera
- Acirsa
  - †Acirsa whitneyi
- †Aclistomycter
  - †Aclistomycter dunagani – type locality for species
  - †Aclistomycter middletoni – type locality for species
- Acris
  - †Acris crepitans
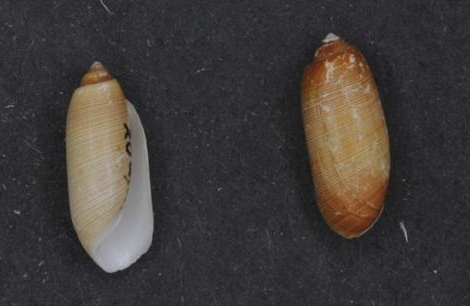
- Shells of Acteocina barrel-bubble sea snails
  Acteocina
- Acteon
  - †Acteon idoneus
  - †Acteon pomilis
  - †Acteon pomilius
  - †Acteon punctatus
- Adeonellopsis – tentative report
- †Adjidaumo
  - †Adjidaumo minutus – or unidentified comparable form
- Admetula
  - †Admetula irregularis – type locality for species
- Adrana
  - †Adrana aldrichiana
- Aedes
- †Aelurodon
  - †Aelurodon ferox
  - †Aelurodon taxoides
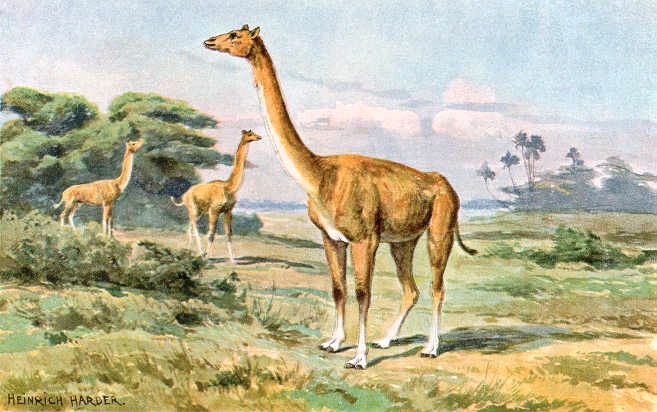
- Life restoration of the Miocene camel Aepycamelus, or the long-necked camel. Heinrich Harder (1920).
  †Aepycamelus
- Agaronia
  - †Agaronia bombylis
  - †Agaronia media
  - †Agaronia mediavia
- Agkistrodon
- †Agriocharis
  - †Agriocharis anza
- †Agriochoerus
  - †Agriochoerus antiquus
- †Agriotherium
  - †Agriotherium schneideri
- †Agrobuccinium
- †Agrobuccinum
  - †Agrobuccinum mansfieldi
- †Aguascalientia
- †Aguispira
  - †Aguispira alternata
- Akera
  - †Akera texana
- †Alforjas
  - †Alforjas taylori – type locality for species
- Aliculastrum
- †Alilepus
  - †Alilepus wilsoni
- †Allaeochelys – or unidentified comparable form
- Alligator
  - †Alligator mississipiensis
  - †Alligator mississippiensis
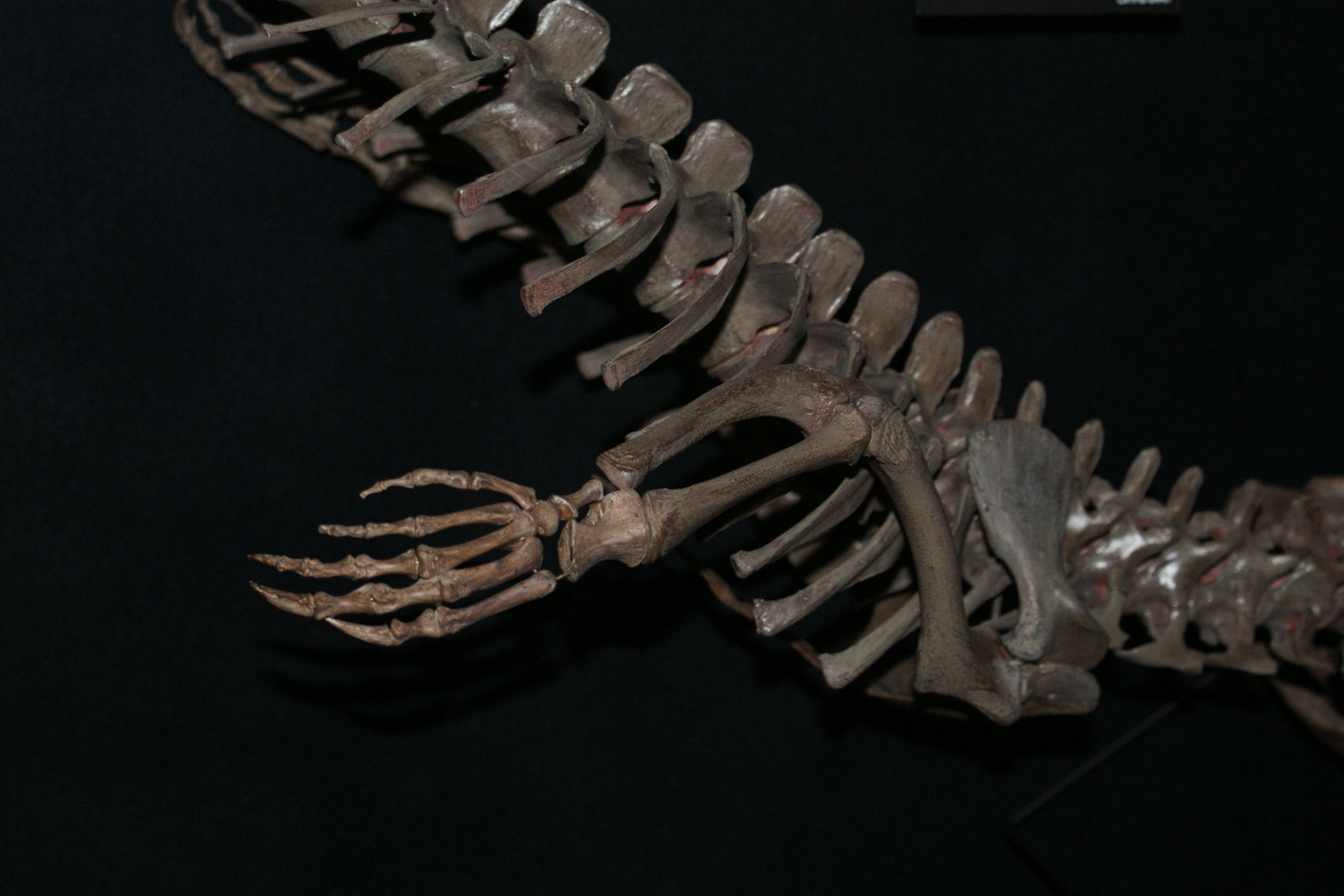
  - Fossilized forelimbs of the Miocene Alligator olseni, or Olsen's Alligator
    †Alligator olseni
- †Allognathosuchus
- †Allomorone
  - †Allomorone burlesonis
- †Allophaiomys
  - †Allophaiomys pliocaenicus
- †Altaspiratella
  - †Altaspiratella bearnensis – tentative report
- Alvania
- †Alveinus
  - †Alveinus minutus
- Amaea
  - †Amaea macula – type locality for species
  - †Amaea texana – type locality for species
- †Amaurellina
  - †Amaurellina plummeri – type locality for species
  - †Amaurellina singleyi
- †Amblema
  - †Amblema plicata
- †Ambystoma
  - †Ambystoma tigrinum
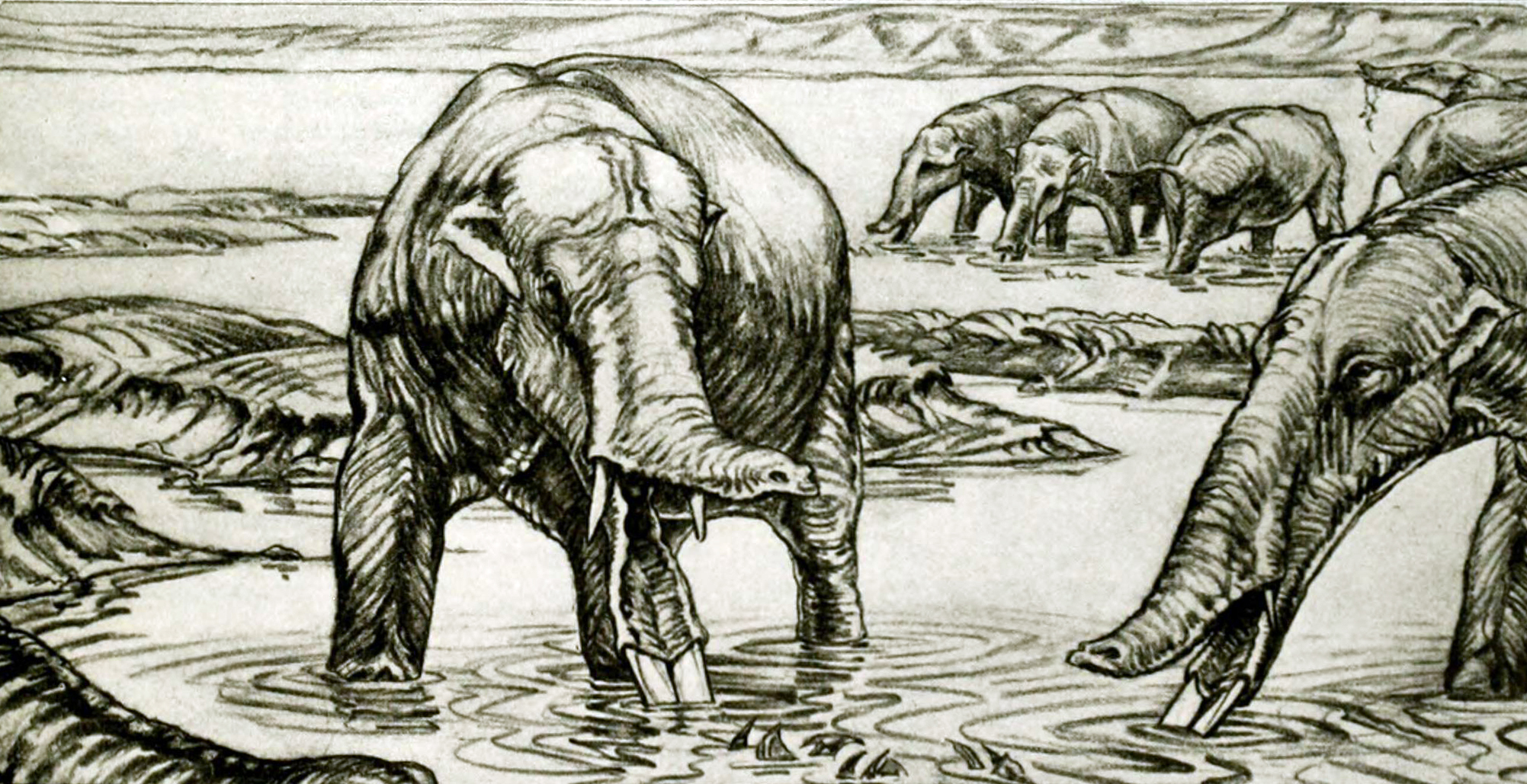
- Life restoration of the Miocene elephant relative Amebelodon. Margret Flinsch (1932).
  †Amebelodon
  - †Amebelodon britti
  - †Amebelodon floridanus
  - †Amebelodon fricki – or unidentified comparable form
- †Ameiurus
- †Amentogerdiopollenites – type locality for genus
  - †Amentogerdiopollenites oligocenensis – type locality for species
- †Amentoplexipollenites – type locality for genus
  - †Amentoplexipollenites catahoulaensis – type locality for species
- Amnicola
  - †Amnicola integra
- †Amphicyon
  - †Amphicyon longiramus
  - †Amphicyon pontoni
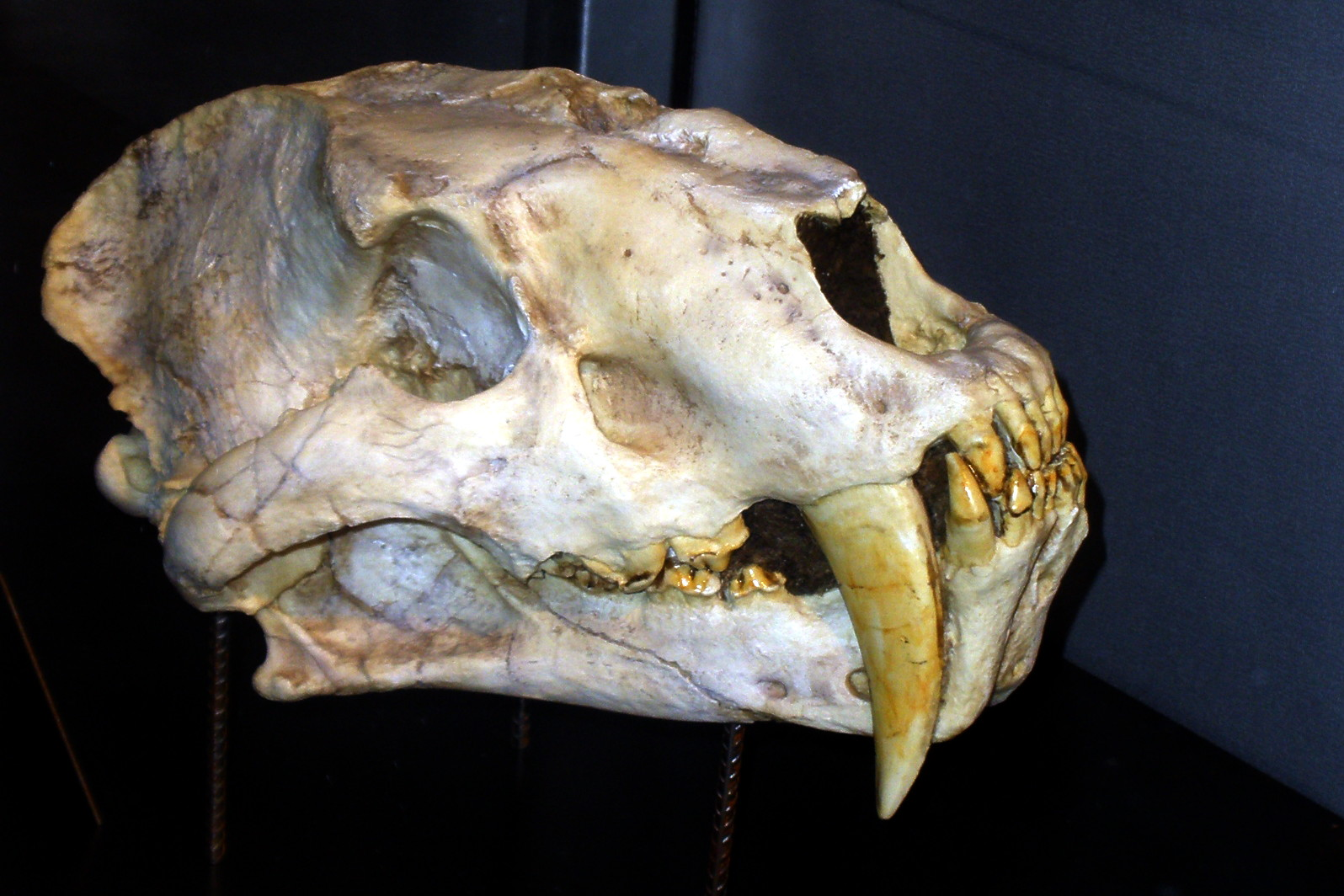
- Fossilized skull of the Miocene saber-toothed cat Amphimachairodus
  †Amphimachairodus
  - †Amphimachairodus coloradensis – or unidentified comparable form
- Amphiuma
  - †Amphiuma antica – type locality for species
- †Amplobalanus – type locality for genus
  - †Amplobalanus texensis – type locality for species
- †Ampullina
  - †Ampullina dumblei
  - †Ampullina recurva
- Amuletum
  - †Amuletum curvocostatum
- Amusium
  - †Amusium zinguli – type locality for species
- †Amynodon
  - †Amynodon advenus
- †Amynodontopsis
  - †Amynodontopsis bodei
- Anadara
  - †Anadara vaughani
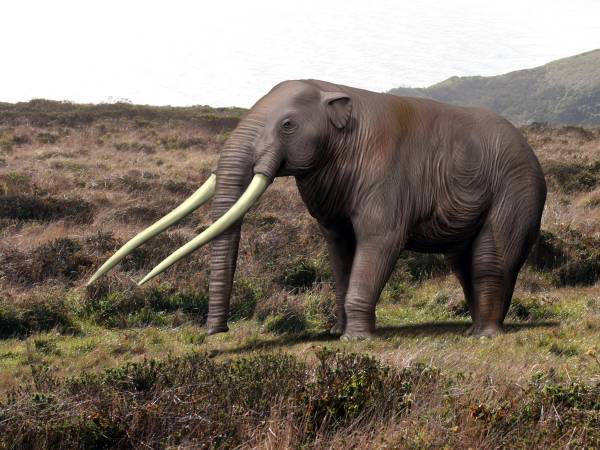
- Life restoration of the Miocene-Pleistocene elephant relative Anancus
  †Anancus
  - †Anancus defloccatus – type locality for species
  - †Anancus orarius – type locality for species
- †Anchitheriomys
- †Anchitherium
  - †Anchitherium navasotae – type locality for species
- Ancilla
  - †Ancilla staminea – type locality for species
  - †Ancilla staminea punctulifera
- †Angelarctocyon
  - †Angelarctocyon australis – type locality for species
- †Angulithes
  - †Angulithes elliotti
- †Anilioides
  - †Anilioides nebraskensis – or unidentified comparable form
- †Anisaster
  - †Anisaster mossomi
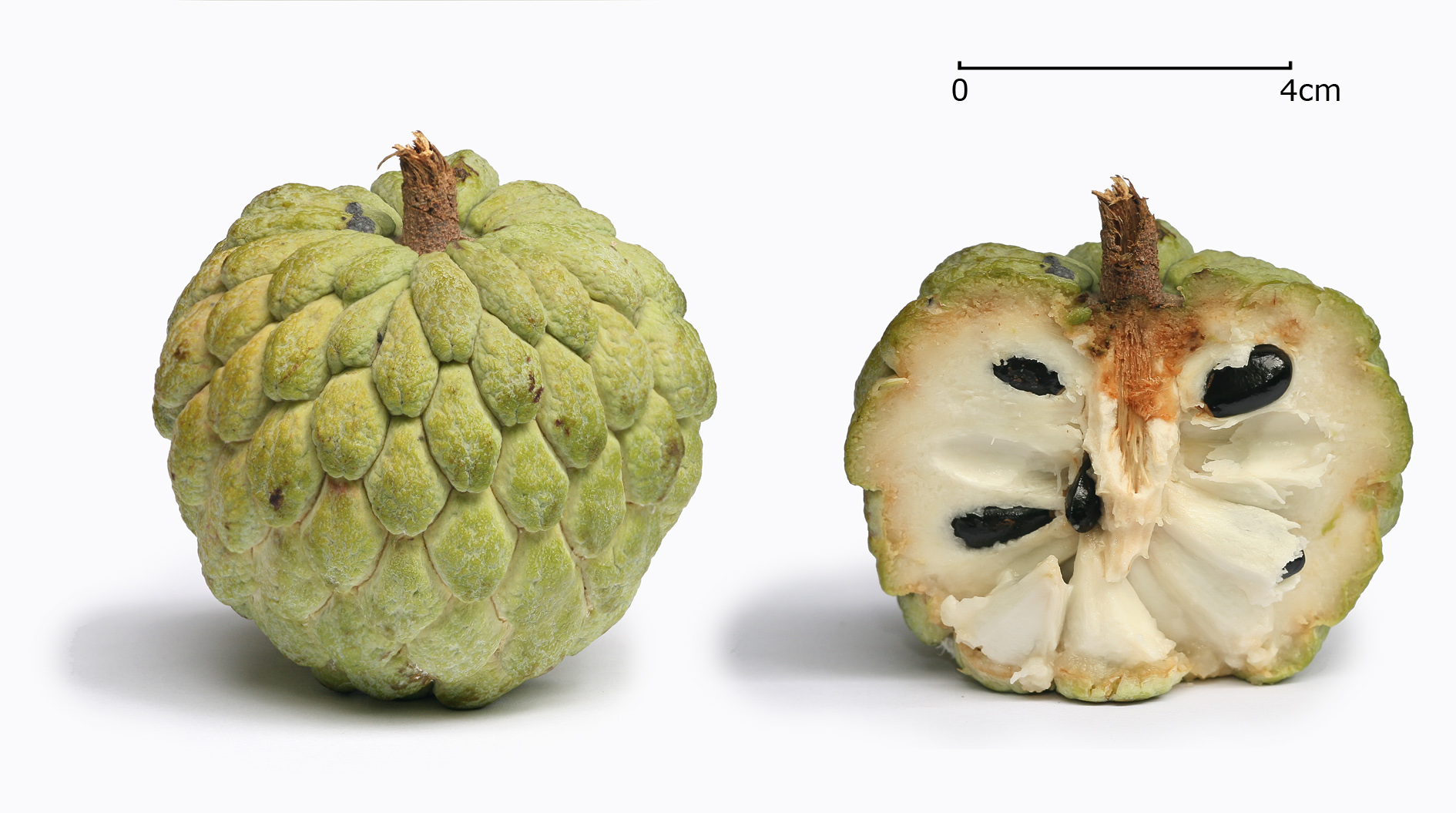
- Modern fruit, whole and in cross-section of an Annona tree
  †Annona
  - †Annona ampla
- Anodontia
  - †Anodontia reklawensis – type locality for species
- †Anomalofusus
- Anomia
  - †Anomia argentaria
  - †Anomia ephippioides
  - †Anomia lisbonensis
- Antalis
  - †Antalis minutistriatum
  - †Antalis mississippiense
  - †Antalis palmerae – type locality for species
- Anthonomus – tentative report
- †Antiguastrea
  - †Antiguastrea cellulosa
- Antillophos
  - †Antillophos multilineatum – type locality for species
- Antrozous
  - †Antrozous pallidus
- †Aphelops
  - †Aphelops malacorhinus
  - †Aphelops megalodus
  - †Aphelops mutilus
- †Aplexia
  - †Aplexia hypnorum
- Aplodinotus
  - †Aplodinotus grunniens
- †Apocynophyllum
  - †Apocynophyllum wilcoxense
- †Apternodus
  - †Apternodus iliffensis
- Aquila
  - †Aquila chrysaetos
- Arca
  - †Arca petropolitana
- †Archaeohippus
  - †Archaeohippus blackbergi – type locality for species
- †Archaeolagus
  - †Archaeolagus acaricolus – or unidentified comparable form
  - †Archaeolagus buangulus – type locality for species
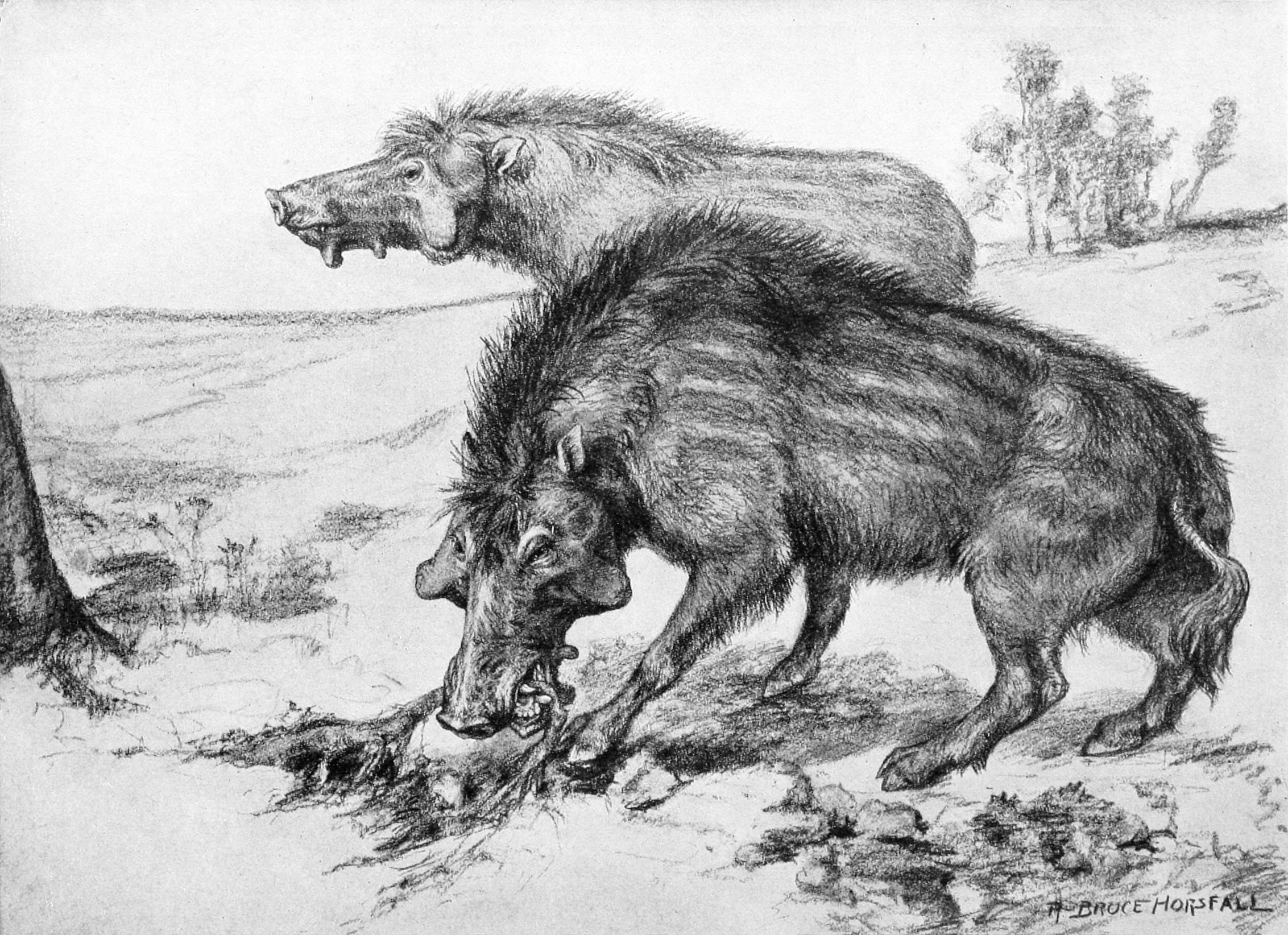
- Life restoration of the Eocene-Oligocene entelodont mammal Archaeotherium
  †Archaeotherium
  - †Archaeotherium mortoni – or unidentified comparable form
- Architectonica
  - †Architectonica aldrichi – type locality for species
  - †Architectonica alveatum
  - †Architectonica amoena
  - †Architectonica bellensis
  - †Architectonica bellistriata
  - †Architectonica bimixta
  - †Architectonica elaborata
  - †Architectonica fimbriaea – type locality for species
  - †Architectonica geminicostata – type locality for species
  - †Architectonica huppertzi
  - †Architectonica meekana
  - †Architectonica ornata
  - †Architectonica phoenicea
  - †Architectonica planiformis
  - †Architectonica reklawensis – type locality for species
  - †Architectonica texcarolina
  - †Architectonica vespertina
- Arcopagia
  - †Arcopagia trumani
- †Arctocyon
  - †Arctocyon mumak – or unidentified comparable form
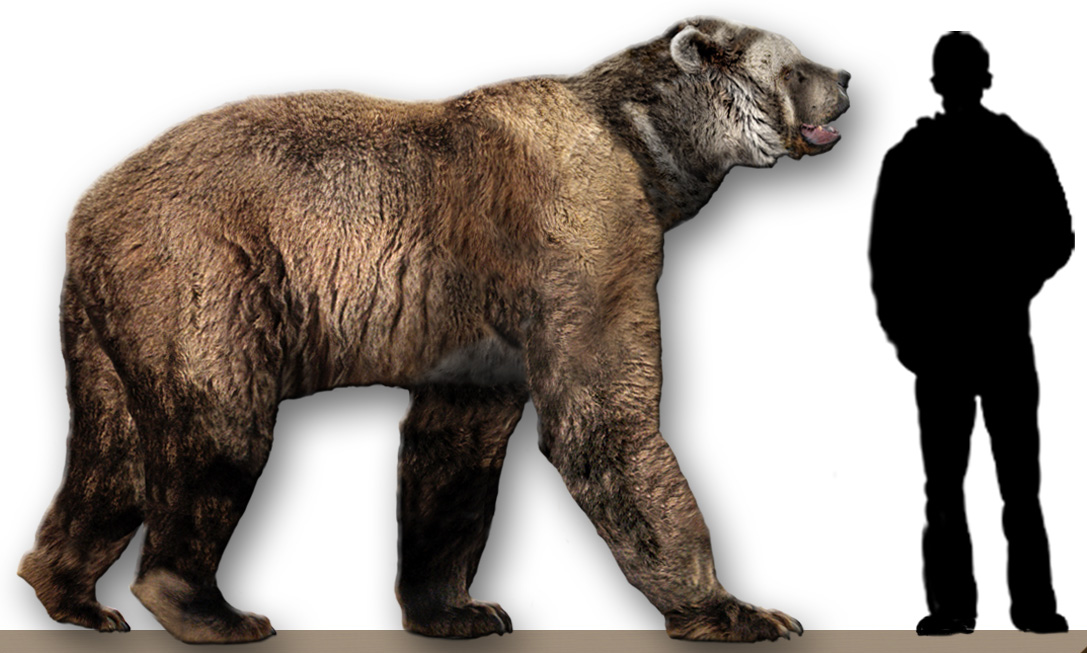
- Restoration of an Arctodus, or short-faced bear, with a human to scale
  †Arctodus
  - †Arctodus simus
- †Arctonasua
  - †Arctonasua gracilis – or unidentified comparable form
- †Ardynomys
  - †Ardynomys occidentalis
- Argobuccinum
- Argyrotheca
  - †Argyrotheca powersi
- Arius – or unidentified comparable form
- Arizona
  - †Arizona elegans
- †Arretotherium
  - †Arretotherium acridens
- †Artocarpus
  - †Artocarpus lessigiana
- Astarte
- Asthenotoma
  - †Asthenotoma eximia
- †Astrohippus
  - †Astrohippus ansae – type locality for species
  - †Astrohippus stockii
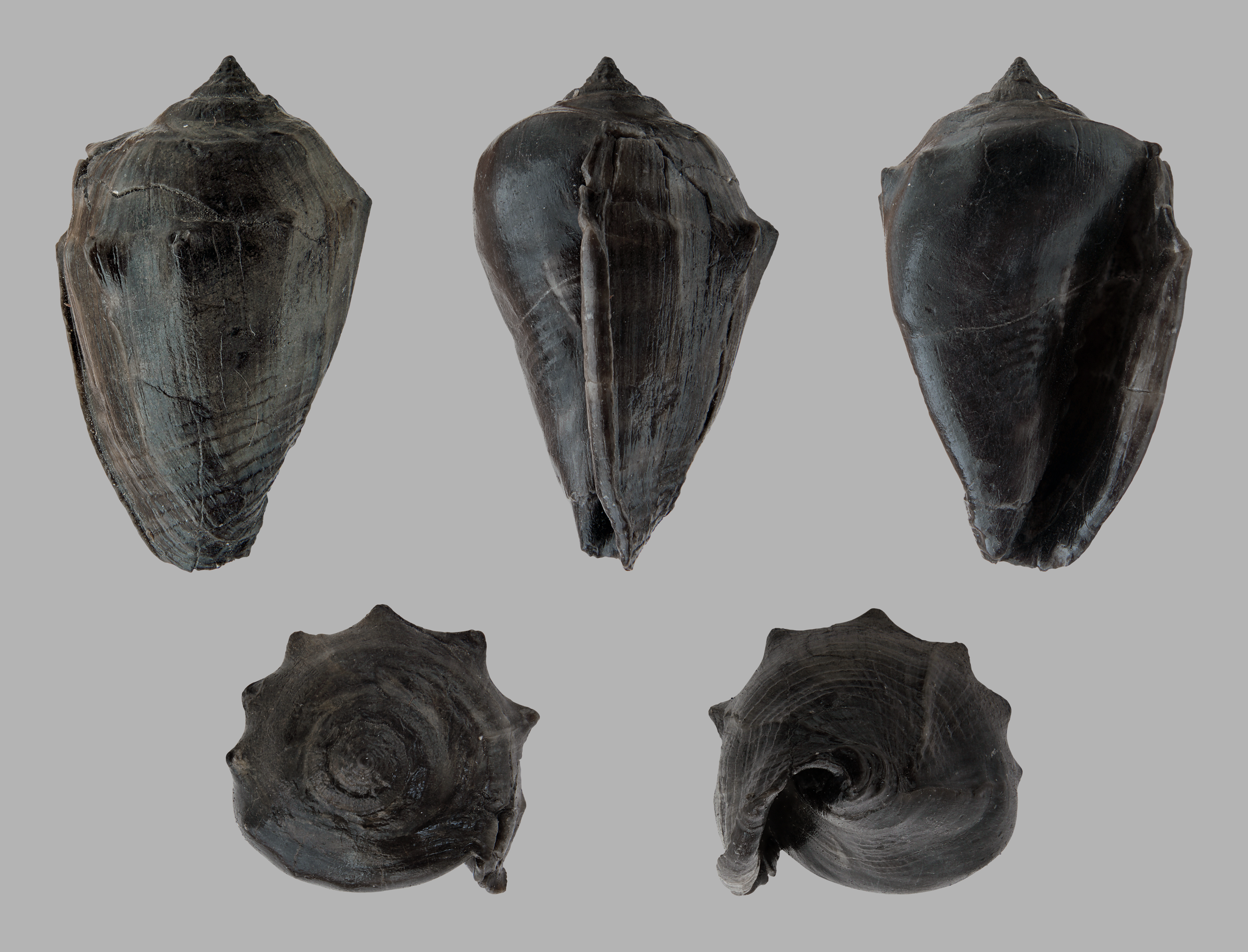
- Multiple views of a fossilized shell of the volute sea snail Athleta
  Athleta
  - †Athleta dalli
  - †Athleta kerensensis
  - †Athleta limopsis
  - †Athleta limposis
  - †Athleta lisbonensis
  - †Athleta olssoni
  - †Athleta petrosa
  - †Athleta rugatus
  - †Athleta stenzeli
  - †Athleta symmetricus
  - †Athleta texanus
  - †Athleta wheelockensis
- †Athletea
  - †Athletea petrosus
- Atlanta
  - †Atlanta eocenica
- †Atopomys
  - †Atopomys texensis
- Atractosteus
  - †Atractosteus spatula
  - †Atractosteus tristoechus – tentative report
- Atrina
  - †Atrina cawcawensis
  - †Atrina gardnerae
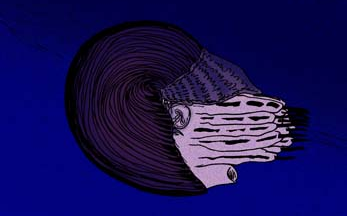
- Restoration of the Paleocene-Miocene nautiloid cephalopod Aturia
  †Aturia
  - †Aturia brazoensis
  - †Aturia laticlavia
  - †Aturia triangula
  - †Aturia turneri
- Atys
  - †Atys atysopsis
  - †Atys trapaquara
- †Aulolithomys
  - †Aulolithomys bounites
- †Australocamelus
  - †Australocamelus orarius – type locality for species
- †Auxontodon
- †Awateria
  - †Awateria retifera

== B ==
- †Baioconodon
- Baiomys
  - †Baiomys rexroadi
- †Baiotomeus
  - †Baiotomeus douglassi
- Bairdia
  - †Bairdia oviformis
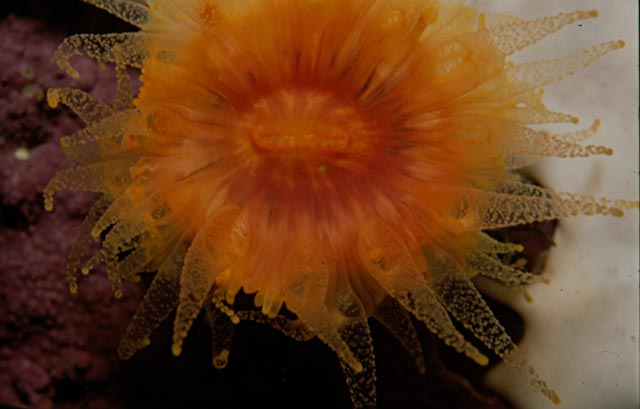
- A living Balanophyllia stony coral
  Balanophyllia
  - †Balanophyllia augustinensis – type locality for species
  - †Balanophyllia desmophyllum
  - †Balanophyllia irrorata
  - †Balanophyllia ponderosa
- Balanus
- Balcis
  - †Balcis exilis
  - †Balcis tenua
  - †Balcis wheeleri
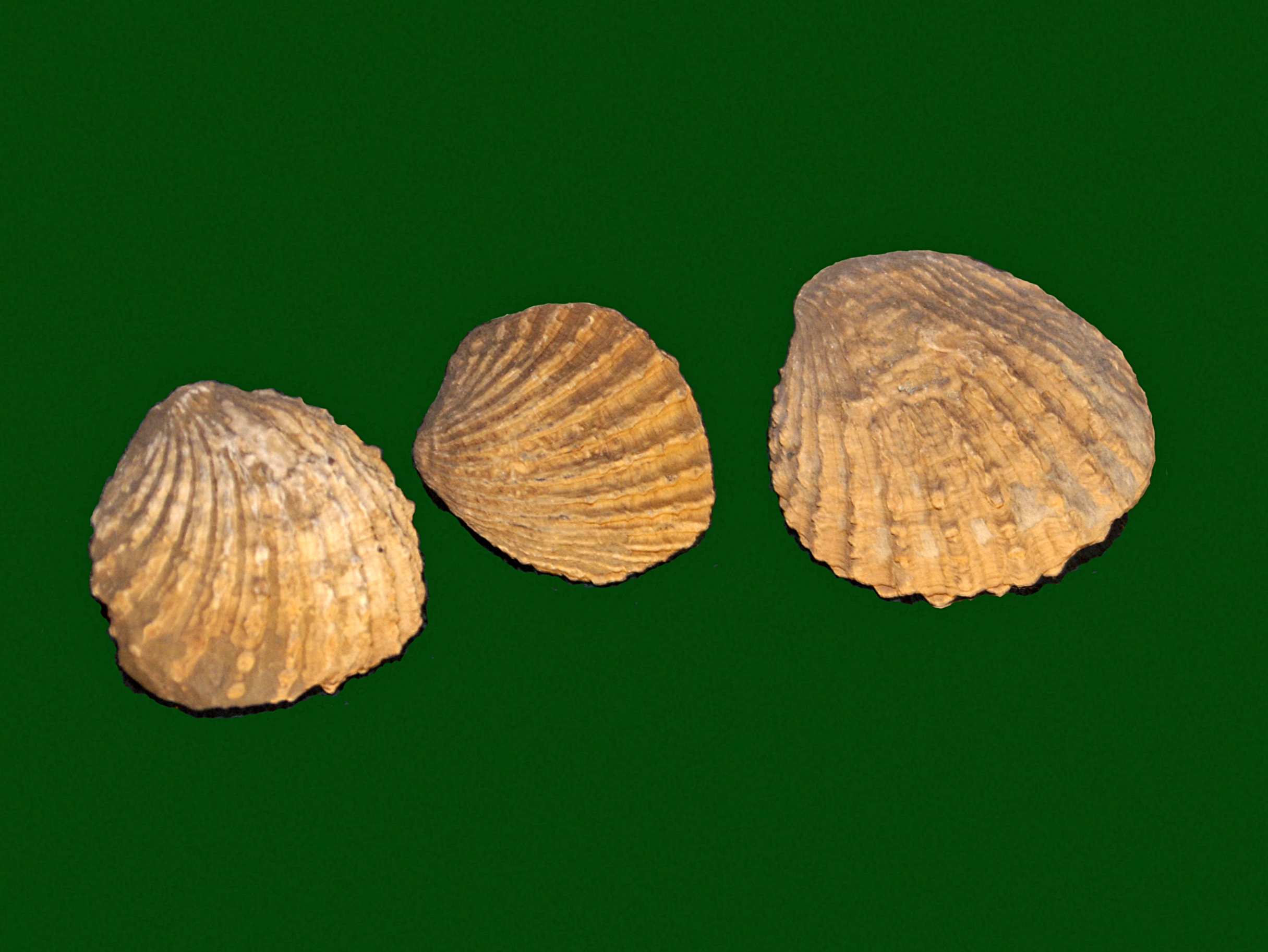
- Three fossilized shells of the Late Cretaceous-Eocene marine bivalve Baluchicardia
  †Baluchicardia
  - †Baluchicardia bulla
  - †Baluchicardia hesperia
  - †Baluchicardia moa
  - †Baluchicardia whitei
  - †Baluchicardia wilcoxensis
- Bankia
  - †Bankia petalus – type locality for species
- †Baptemys – or unidentified comparable form
- Barbatia
  - †Barbatia cuculloides
  - †Barbatia deusseni
  - †Barbatia ludoviciana
  - †Barbatia reklawensis – type locality for species
  - †Barbatia salebrosus – type locality for species
  - †Barbatia uxorispalmeri
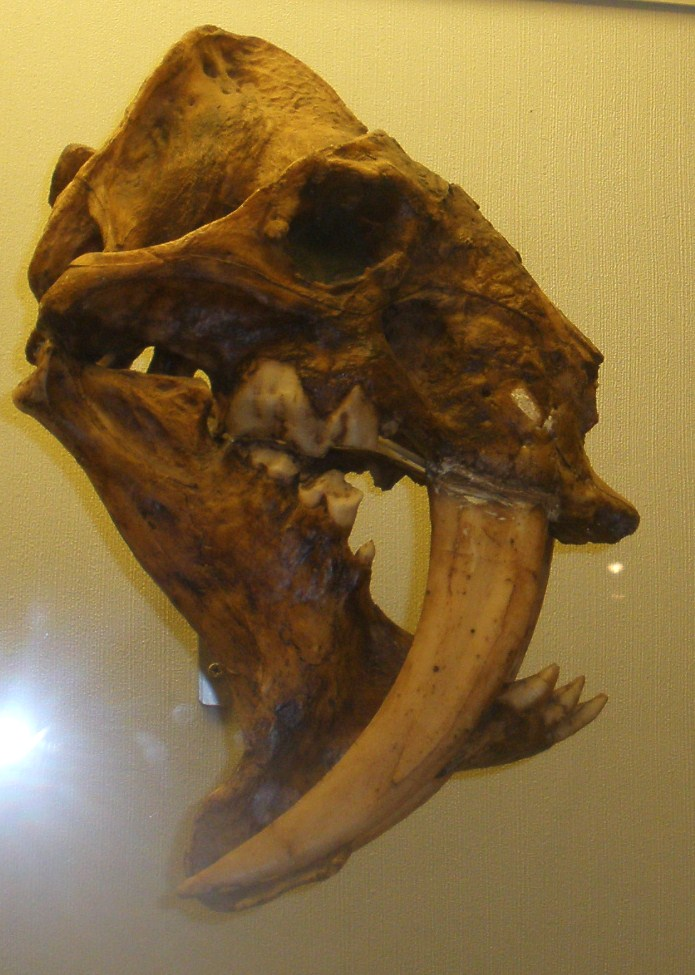
- Fossilized skull of the Miocene-Pliocene false saber-toothed cat Barbourofelis
  †Barbourofelis
  - †Barbourofelis whitfordi
- Bassariscus
  - †Bassariscus casei
- Bathyarca
  - †Bathyarca claibornica – type locality for species
- †Bathygenys
  - †Bathygenys reevesi – type locality for species
- Bathytoma
  - †Bathytoma nonplicata – or unidentified comparable form
- Bathytormus
  - †Bathytormus flexurus
- †Batrachosauroides
  - †Batrachosauroides dissimulans
- †Bauzaia – type locality for genus
  - †Bauzaia lamberi – type locality for species
  - †Bauzaia melrosensis
  - †Bauzaia mucronata
- †Beckiasorex
  - †Beckiasorex hibbardi
- Bela – report made of unidentified related form or using admittedly obsolete nomenclature
  - †Bela rebeccae
- †Belosaepia
  - †Belosaepia pennae – type locality for species
  - †Belosaepia ungula
  - †Belosaepia ungulata
- †Belosepia
  - †Belosepia pennae – type locality for species
- †Bensonomys
  - †Bensonomys coffeyi
- †Beretra
  - †Beretra ornatula – or unidentified related form
- Bison
  - †Bison alaskensis
  - †Bison antiquus
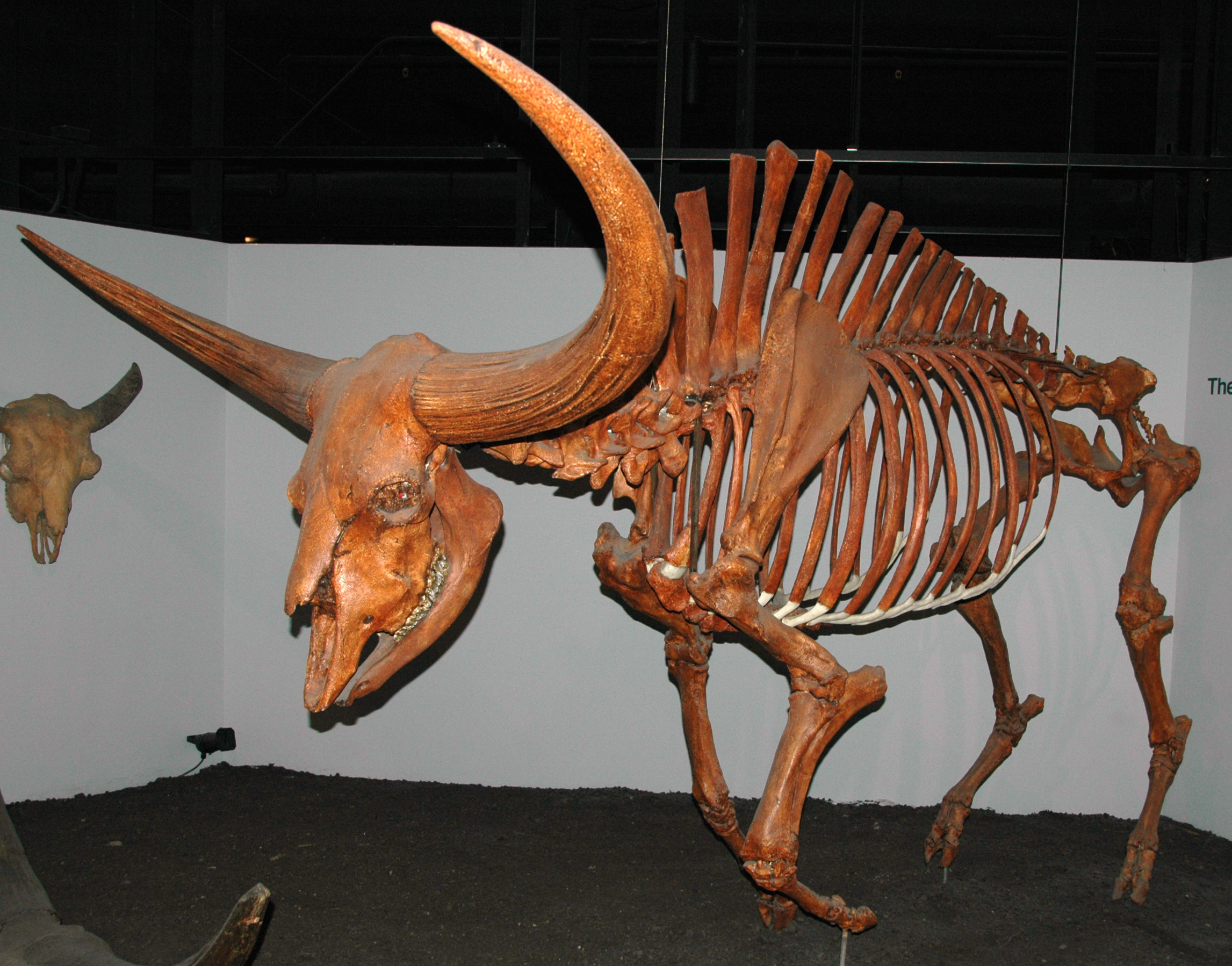
  - Mounted fossilized skeleton of the Pleistocene Bison latifrons, or long-horned bison
    †Bison latifrons
- Bittiolum – report made of unidentified related form or using admittedly obsolete nomenclature
  - †Bittiolum webbi
- Bittium
  - †Bittium anita
  - †Bittium estellense
  - †Bittium estellensis
  - †Bittium henryleai
  - †Bittium ridgei – type locality for species
  - †Bittium tresquatrum – type locality for species
- †Blancocamelus
  - †Blancocamelus meadei
- †Blancotherium – type locality for genus
  - †Blancotherium buckneri – type locality for species. Formerly known as Gnathabelodon buckneri.
- Blarina
  - †Blarina brevicauda – or unidentified comparable form
- †Blastomeryx
  - †Blastomeryx vigoratus – type locality for species
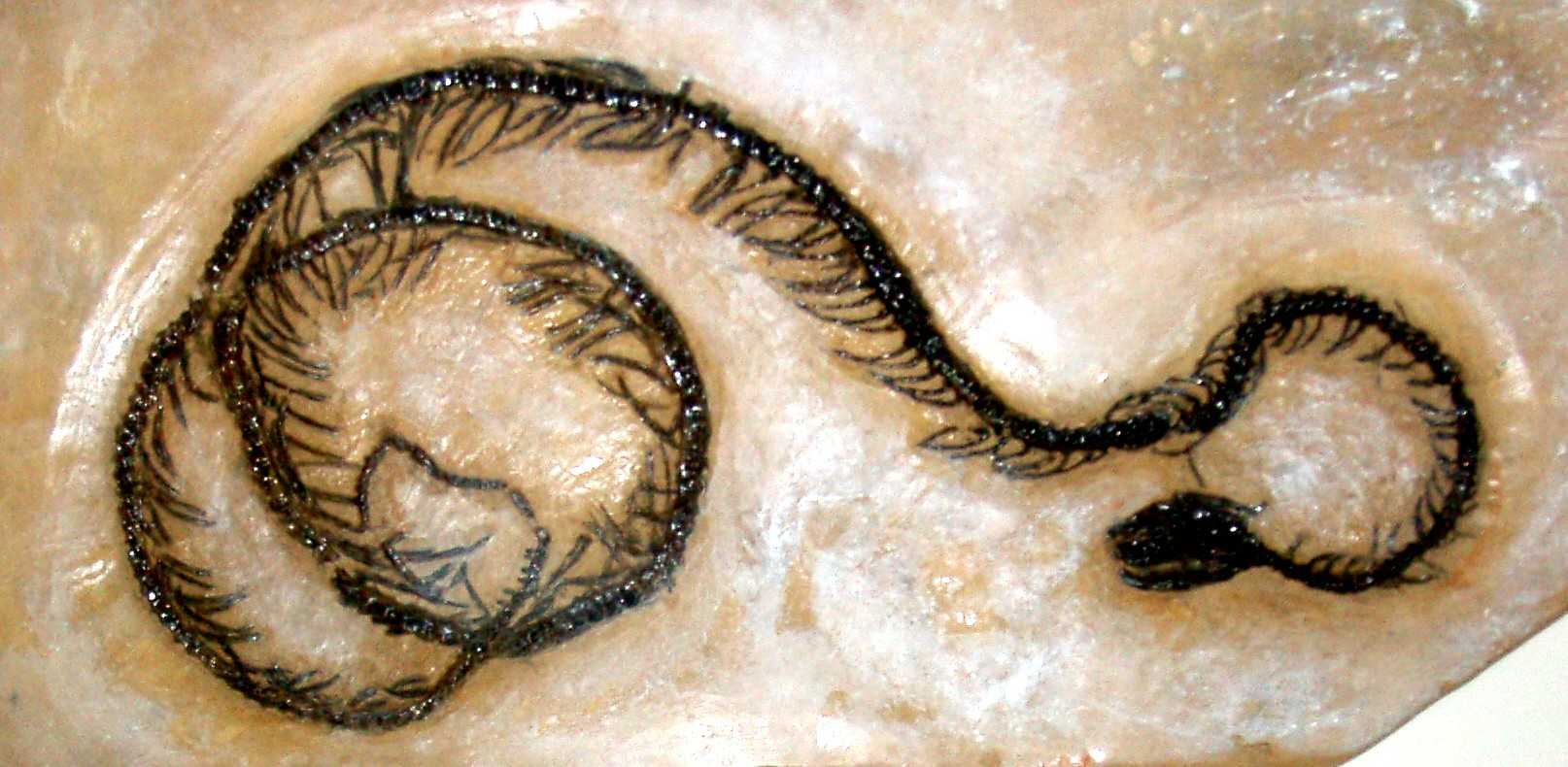
- Fossilized skeleton of the eocene-?Miocene boa snake Boavus
  †Boavus – tentative report
  - †Boavus affinis
- †Bolis
  - †Bolis enterogramma
- †Bombacacidites
  - †Bombacacidites paulus
- †Bomburia – or unidentified comparable form
- †Bonellitia
  - †Bonellitia bastropensis
  - †Bonellitia parilis
- †Borealosuchus
- Bornia
  - †Bornia prima
  - †Bornia zapataensis
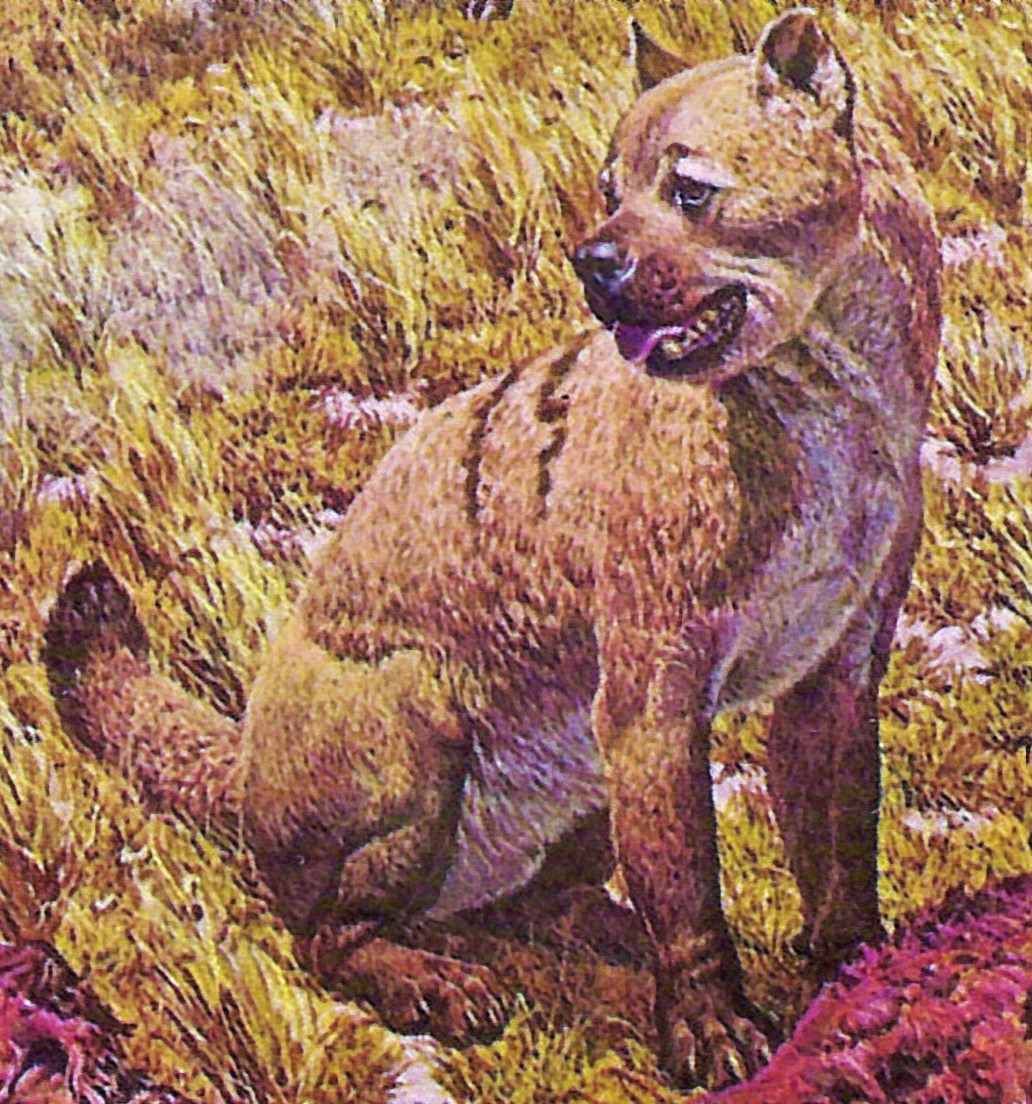
- Restoration of two of the Miocene-Pliocene bone-crushing dog genus Borophagus preying on a camel. Jay Matternes (1964).
  †Borophagus
  - †Borophagus diversidens
  - †Borophagus hilli – type locality for species
  - †Borophagus pugnator – or unidentified comparable form
  - †Borophagus secundus
- †Bouromeryx
  - †Bouromeryx submilleri
- †Boverisuchus
  - †Boverisuchus vorax – or unidentified comparable form
- Brachidontes
  - †Brachidontes alabamensis
  - †Brachidontes saffordi
  - †Brachidontes texanus
- Brachiodontes
- †Brachyerix – tentative report
  - †Brachyerix hibbardi – type locality for species
- †Brachyhyops
  - †Brachyhyops viensis
  - †Brachyhyops wyomingensis
- †Brachyopsigale
  - †Brachyopsigale dubius
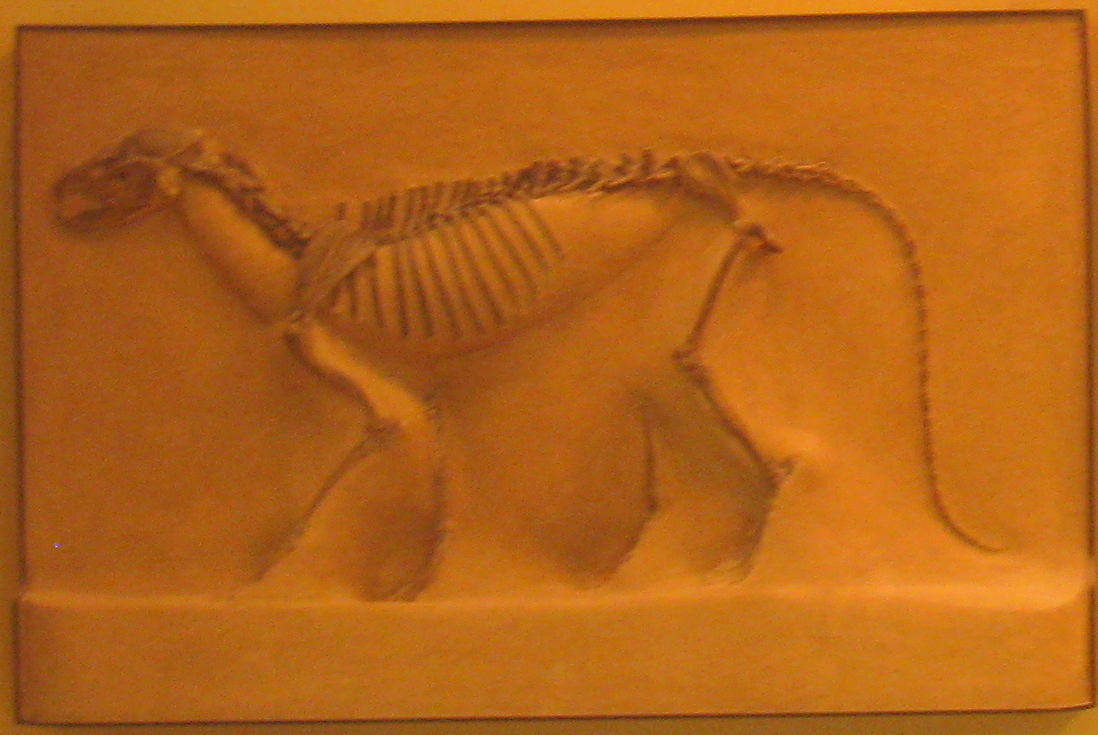
- Skeletal reconstruction of the Eocene-Oligocene bear-dog Brachyrhynchocyon
  †Brachyrhynchocyon
  - †Brachyrhynchocyon dodgei
- †Brauzaia
  - †Brauzaia melrosensis
- †Brazosiella – type locality for genus
  - †Brazosiella kokeni – type locality for species
  - †Brazosiella moselevi
  - †Brazosiella moseleyi – type locality for species
- Bregmaceros
  - †Bregmaceros troelli – type locality for species
- Brissus
  - †Brissus exiguus
- †Bryozoan
- Bufo
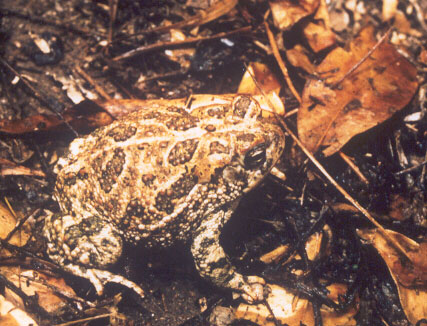
  - A living Anaxyrus cognatus (formerly Bufo cognatus), or Great Plains toad
    †Bufo cognatus
  - †Bufo woodhousei
- †Buisnictis
  - †Buisnictis breviramus
- Bulimulus
  - †Bulimulus dealbatus
- Bullia
  - †Bullia altilis – type locality for species
  - †Bullia ancillops
  - †Bullia ellipticum – type locality for species
  - †Bullia tenera
- †Bulovia
  - †Bulovia weisbordi

== C ==
- Cadulus
  - †Cadulus abruptus
  - †Cadulus aldrichi
  - †Cadulus bisissura – type locality for species
  - †Cadulus ouachitensis
  - †Cadulus phoenicea
  - †Cadulus subcoarcuatus
  - †Cadulus turgidus
- Caecum – or unidentified comparable form
- †Caenolambda
  - †Caenolambda jepseni
- Caestocorbula
  - †Caestocorbula wailesiana
- †Calamagras
  - †Calamagras weigeli
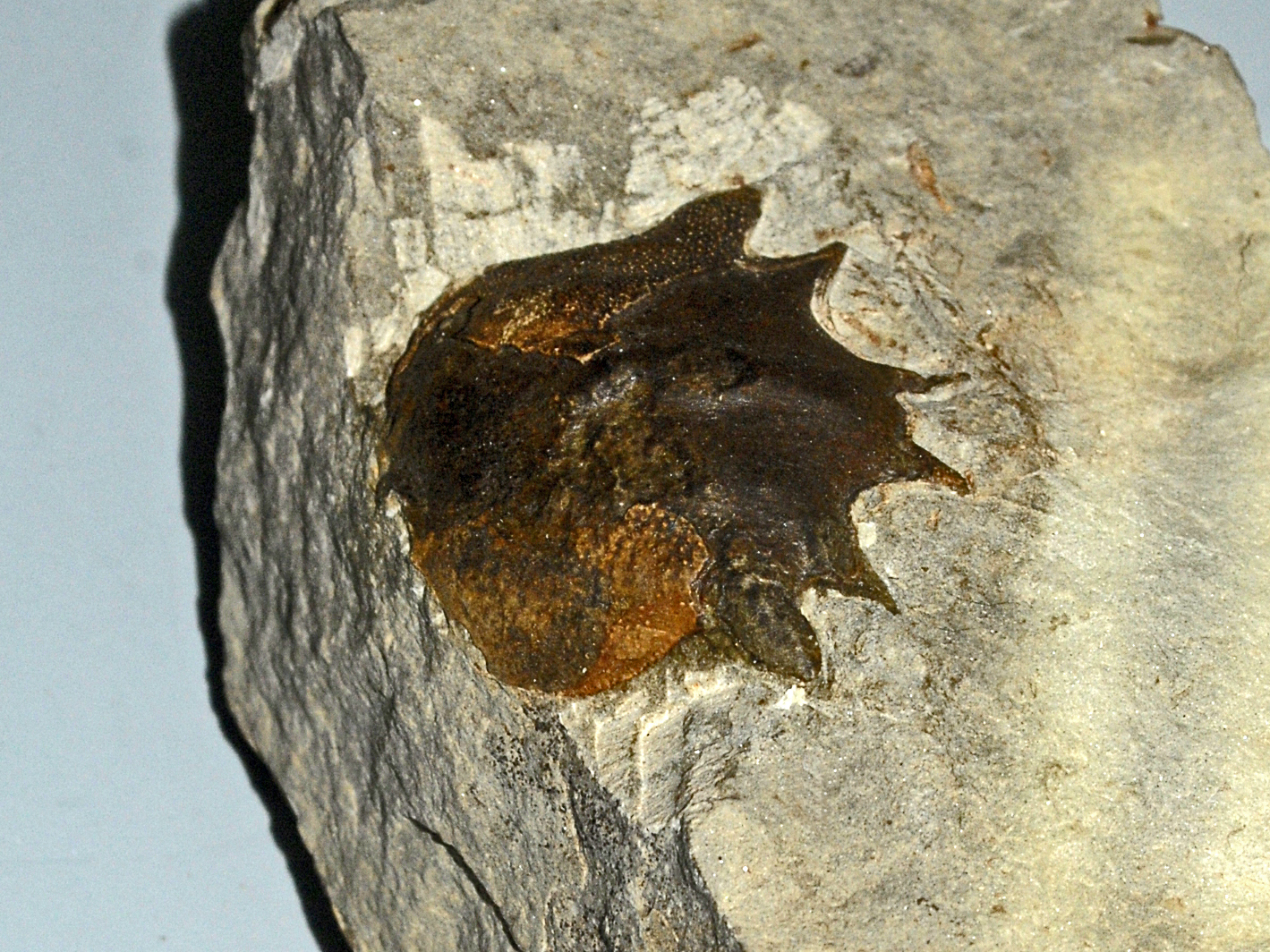
- Fossilized carapace of the Paleocene-Miocene crab Calappilia
  †Calappilia
  - †Calappilia diglypta
- †Calippus
  - †Calippus cerasinus – or unidentified comparable form
  - †Calippus circulus – type locality for species
  - †Calippus large informal
  - †Calippus martini
  - †Calippus placidus
  - †Calippus proplacidus
  - †Calippus regulus – type locality for species
- Callianassa
  - †Callianassa brazoensis
  - †Callianassa wechesensis
- Callucina
  - †Callucina sabelli
- †Calorhadia
  - †Calorhadia bella
  - †Calorhadia compsa
  - †Calorhadia diminutia – type locality for species
  - †Calorhadia opulenta
- Calyptraea
- †Calyptraphorus
  - †Calyptraphorus aldrichi
  - †Calyptraphorus popenoe
  - †Calyptraphorus trinodiferus
  - †Calyptraphorus velatus
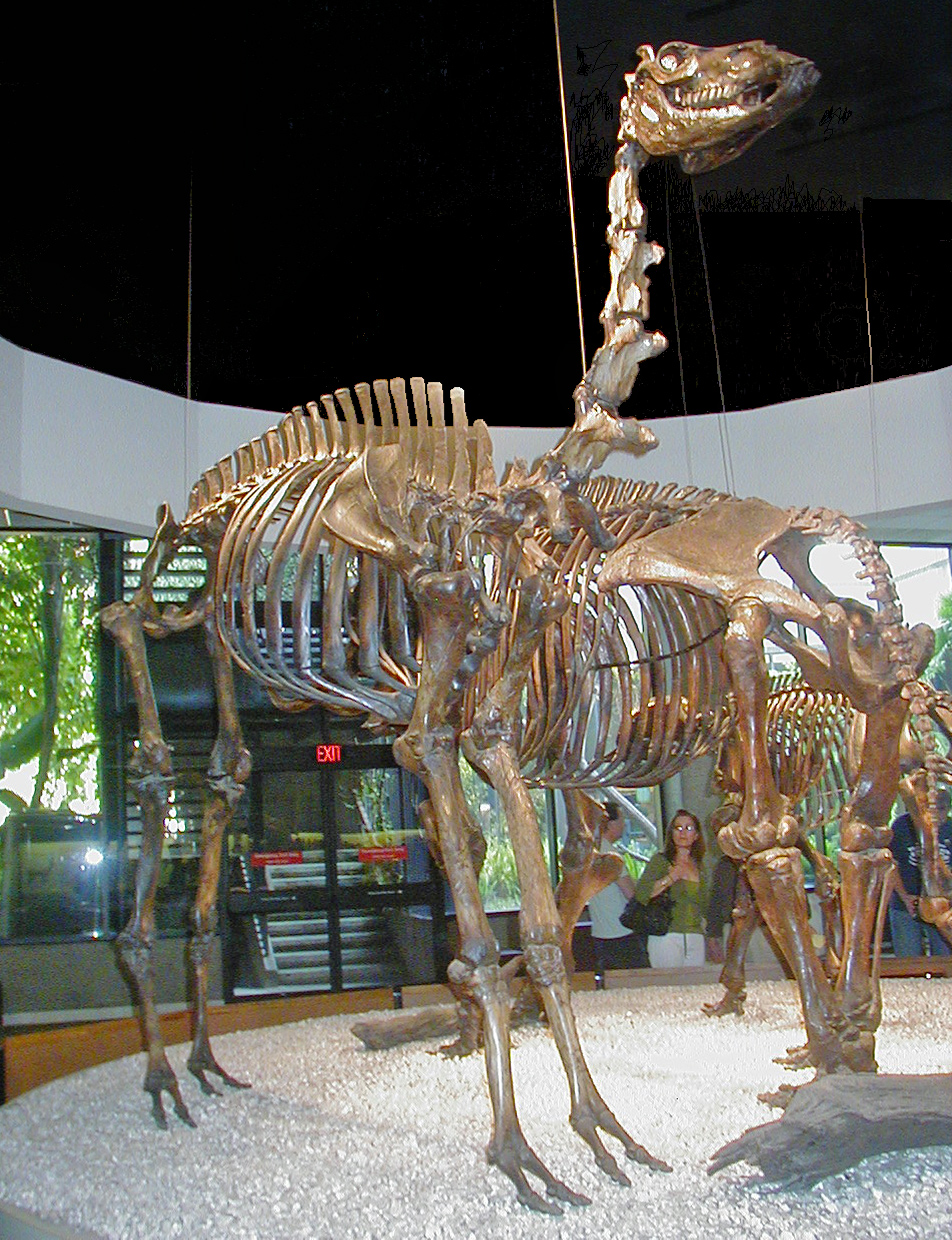
- Mounted fossilized skeleton of the Pliocene-Holocene camel Camelops
  †Camelops
  - †Camelops hesternus – type locality for species
  - †Camelops minidokae
- †Camptoceratops
  - †Camptoceratops priscus – type locality for species
- Cancellaria
- †Cancelrana
  - †Cancelrana finexa
- Candona
  - †Candona lactea – or unidentified comparable form
  - †Candona nyensis
- Canis
  - †Canis armbrusteri
  - †Canis dirus
  - †Canis edwardii
  - †Canis latrans
  - †Canis lepophagus – type locality for species
- Cantharus
  - †Cantharus casteri
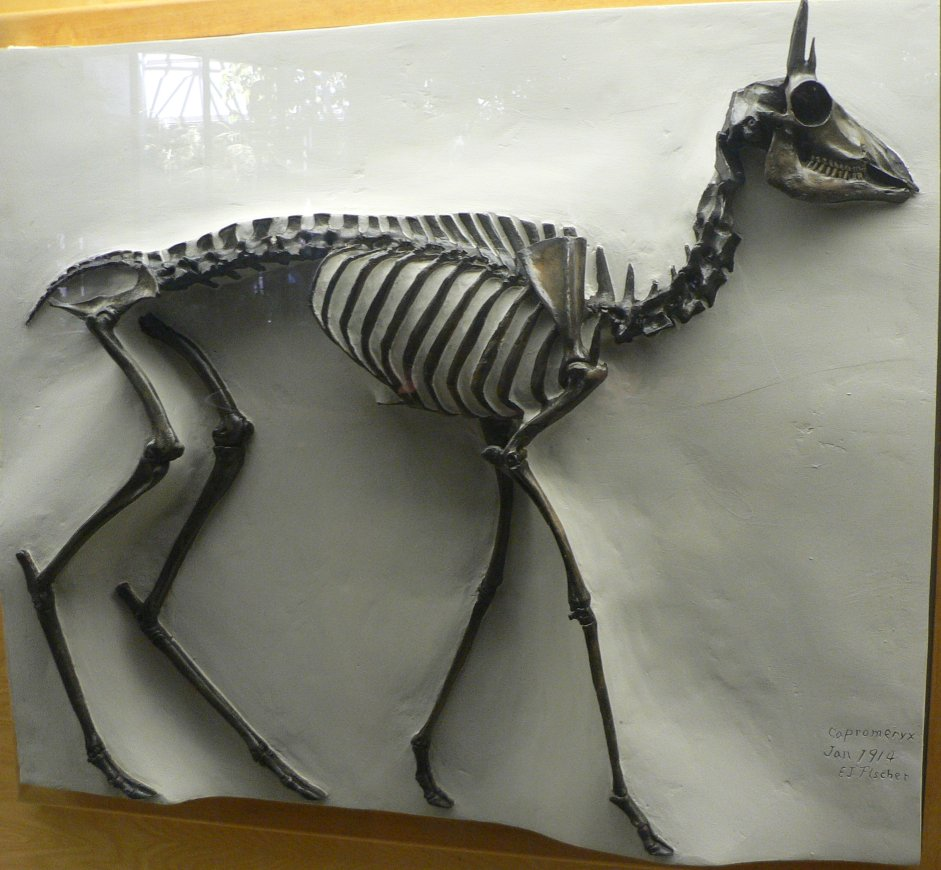
- Fossilized skeleton of the Pleistocene dwarf pronghorn Capromeryx
  †Capromeryx
  - †Capromeryx furcifer
- Capulus
  - †Capulus americanus
- Carapus
  - †Carapus smithvillensis – type locality for species
- Carcharhinus
  - †Carcharhinus gibbesi
- Cardiomya
  - †Cardiomya fredsmithi – type locality for species
- Cardium
- †Caricella
  - †Caricella cherokeensis
  - †Caricella demissa
  - †Caricella heilprini
  - †Caricella stenzeli
- †Carpocyon
  - †Carpocyon robustus
- †Carpolithus
- Carychium
  - †Carychium exiguum
- Caryocorbula
  - †Caryocorbula cappa
  - †Caryocorbula coloradoensis
  - †Caryocorbula deusseni
  - †Caryocorbula engonatoides
  - †Caryocorbula kennedyi
  - †Caryocorbula marquezensis – type locality for species
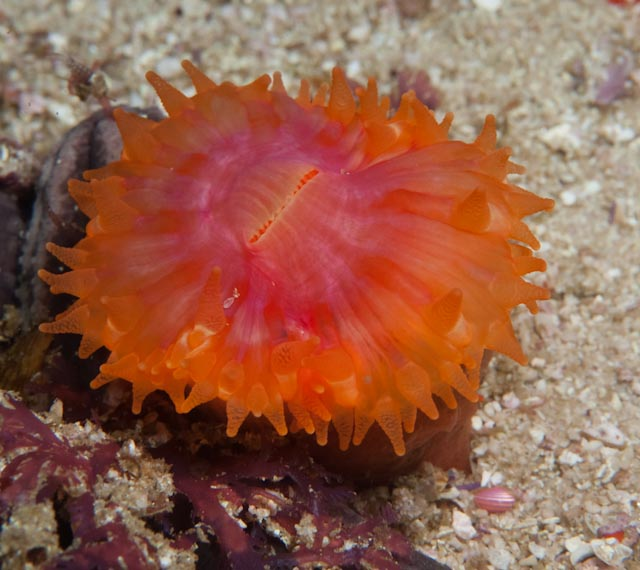
- A living Caryophyllia solitary coral
  Caryophyllia
  - †Caryophyllia constricta – type locality for species
  - †Caryophyllia mediavia – type locality for species
  - †Caryophyllia texana – type locality for species
- Castor
  - †Castor canadensis
- Catagonus
- †Caveola
  - †Caveola ostium – type locality for species
- Celleporaria
  - †Celleporaria granulosa
- Celtis
- †Centetodon
  - †Centetodon chadronensis
  - †Centetodon pulcher
- Centropomus – tentative report
- Ceratobulimina
  - †Ceratobulimina eximia
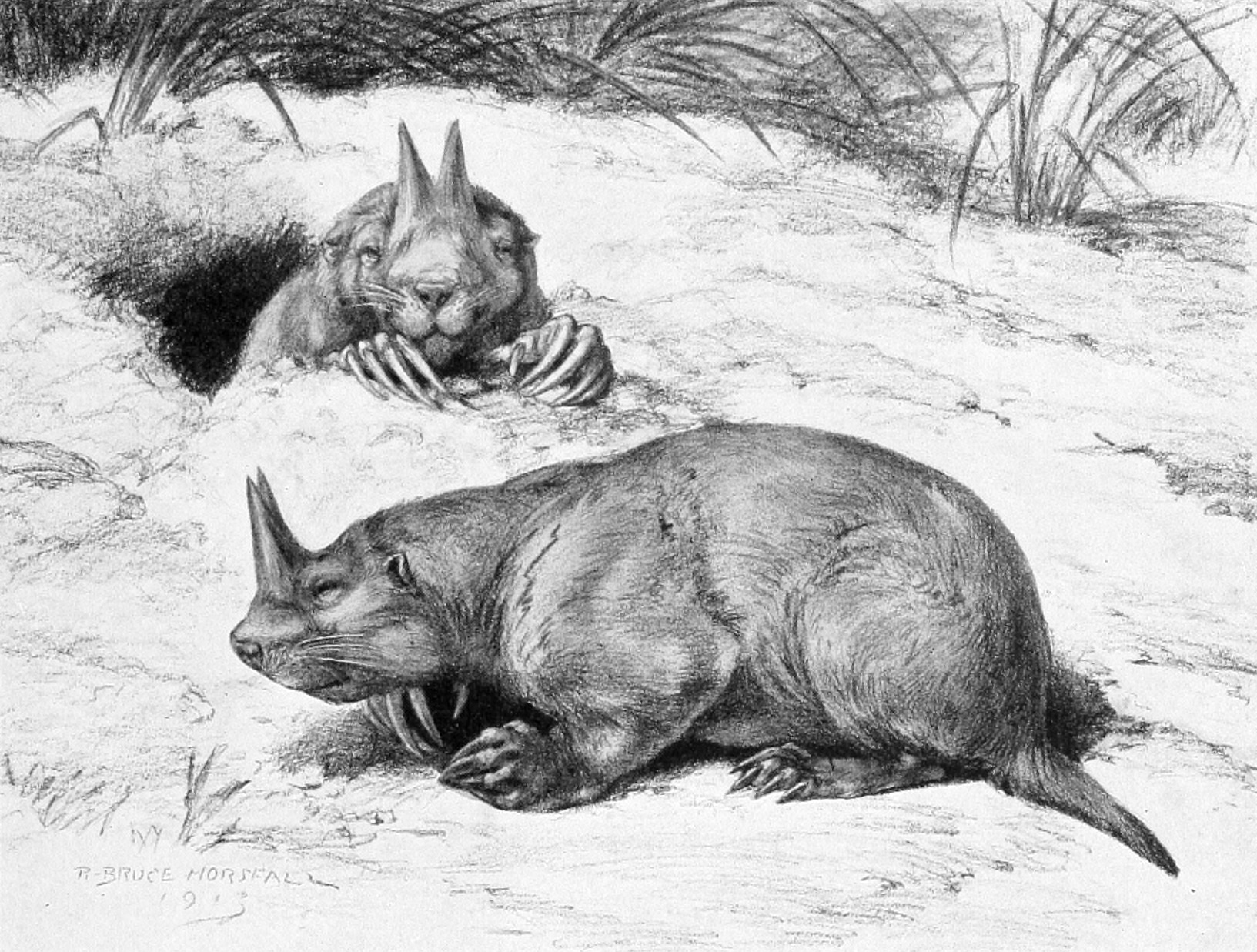
- Life restoration of the Miocene-Pleistocene horned gopher Ceratogaulus. Robert Bruce Horsfall (1913).
  †Ceratogaulus
  - †Ceratogaulus anecdotus – or unidentified comparable form
- †Cerdocyon
  - †Cerdocyon texanus – type locality for species
- Cerithiella
  - †Cerithiella terebropsis
- †Cerithioderma
  - †Cerithioderma primum
- Cerithiopsis
- Cerithium – tentative report
- Chaetodipus
  - †Chaetodipus hispidus
- Chama
  - †Chama taylorensis – type locality for species
- Charina
  - †Charina prebottae
- †Charophyte
  - †Charophyte oogonia
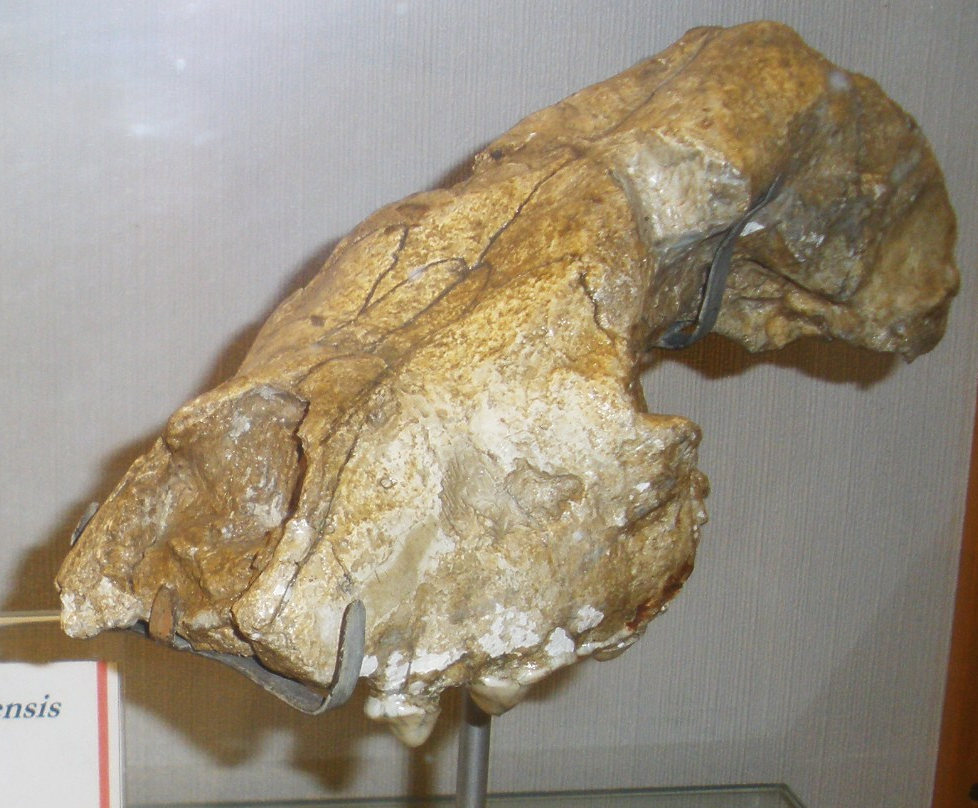
- Fossilized cranium of the Pliocene-Pleistocene hyena Chasmaporthetes
  †Chasmaporthetes
  - †Chasmaporthetes ossifragus
- †Chiromyoides
  - †Chiromyoides minor – or unidentified comparable form
  - †Chiromyoides potior
- Chironomus
  - †Chironomus kirklandi – type locality for species
- Chlamys
  - †Chlamys beverlyi
  - †Chlamys burlesonensis
- †Chriacus
  - †Chriacus baldwini
- †Cimolodon
- †Cimomia
  - †Cimomia vaughani – type locality for species
- Cirsotrema
  - †Cirsotrema nassulum
- Cissus
  - †Cissus pulcherrima
- †Claibornichthys
  - †Claibornichthys troelli – type locality for species
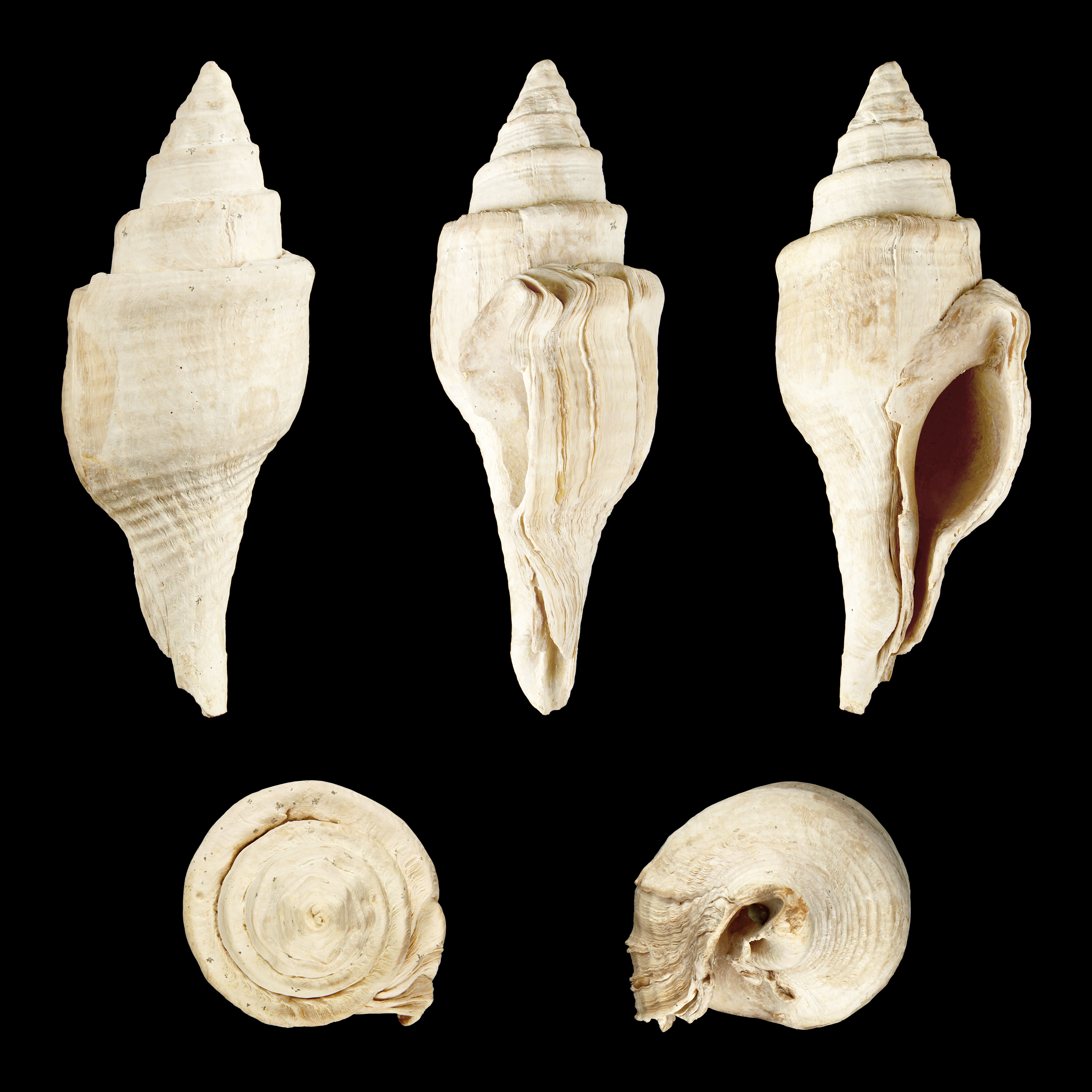
- Multiple views of a fossilized shell of the Paleocene-Pliocene spindle sea snail Clavilithes
  Clavilithes
  - †Clavilithes acus – type locality for species
  - †Clavilithes chamberlaini
  - †Clavilithes kennedyanus
  - †Clavilithes parvetorbis – type locality for species
  - †Clavilithes penrosei
  - †Clavilithes regexus
  - †Clavilithes texanus
- Clavus – tentative report
  - †Clavus dipta
- †Cleonidius
  - †Cleonidius channingensis – type locality for species
  - †Cleonidius ritablancaensis – type locality for species
- Clithrocytheridea
  - †Clithrocytheridea garretti
- Closia
  - †Closia semen
  - †Closia semenoides
- Clypeaster
  - †Clypeaster oxybaphon – or unidentified comparable form
  - †Clypeaster rogersi
- †Cochlefusia
  - †Cochlefusia serrae – type locality for species
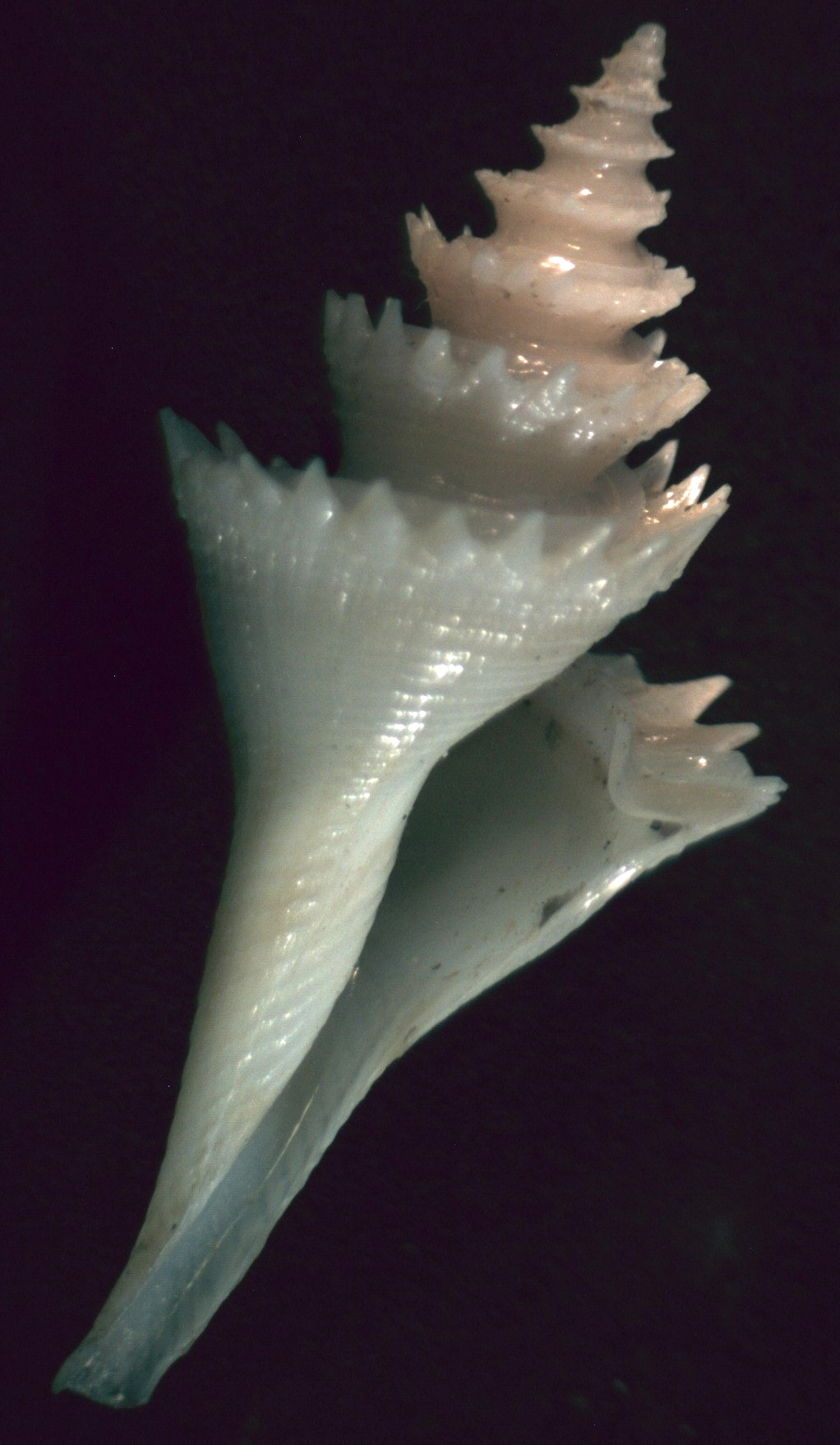
- Shell of a Cochlespira sea snail
  Cochlespira
  - †Cochlespira bastropensis
  - †Cochlespira bella
  - †Cochlespira columbaria
  - †Cochlespira engonata
  - †Cochlespira greggi – tentative report
- †Cochlespirella
  - †Cochlespirella nana
- †Cochlespiropsis
  - †Cochlespiropsis engonata
- Cochliolepis
  - †Cochliolepis palaeocenica – type locality for species
- Cochlodesma
  - †Cochlodesma howei – or unidentified comparable form
  - †Cochlodesma ovalis – type locality for species
- †Colodon
  - †Colodon stovalli
- Coluber
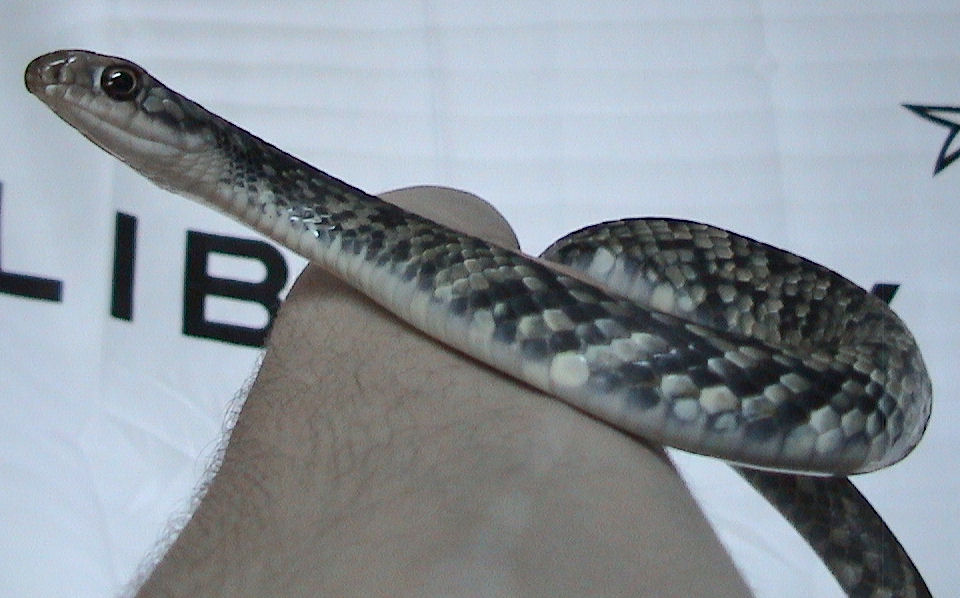
  - A living Coluber constrictor, or eastern racer
    †Coluber constrictor
- Colubraria
  - †Colubraria cedri
- Columbella – report made of unidentified related form or using admittedly obsolete nomenclature
  - †Columbella punctostriata
- †Colwellia
  - †Colwellia bilineata – type locality for species
- †Combretum
  - †Combretum bartonii
- Cominella – or unidentified comparable form
  - †Cominella pachecoi
- Conomitra
  - †Conomitra texana
- Conopeum
  - †Conopeum damicornis
- †Contracuparius – type locality for genus
  - †Contracuparius huntsvillensis – type locality for species
  - †Contracuparius robustus – type locality for species
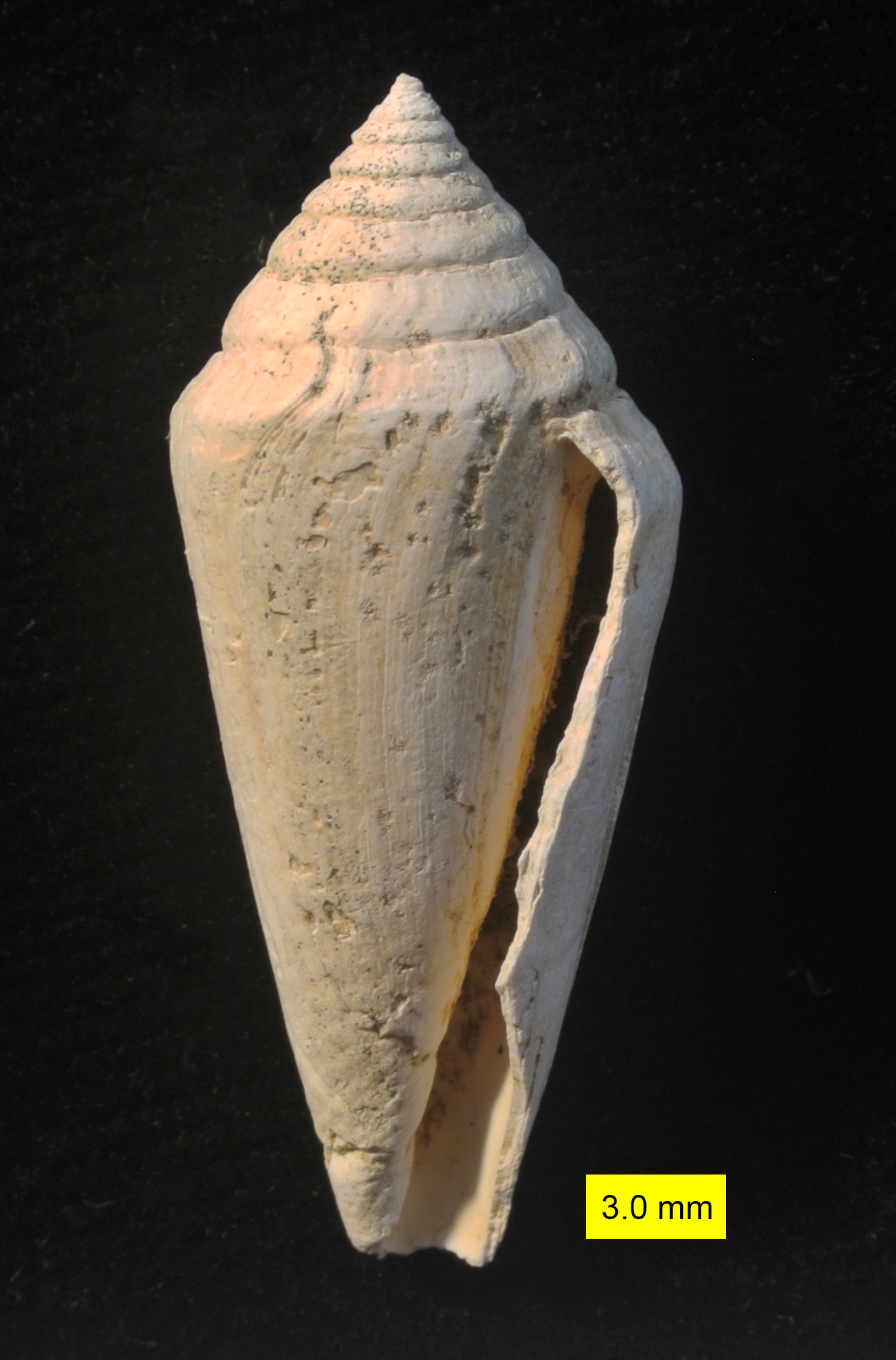
- Fossilized shell of a Conus cone snail
  Conus
  - †Conus sauridens – type locality for species
  - †Conus smithvillensis
- †Copemys
- †Coptostoma
  - †Coptostoma rameum
  - †Coptostoma ulmulum
- Corbicula
  - †Corbicula texana
- Corbula
  - †Corbula alabamiensis
  - †Corbula augustae
  - †Corbula cappa
  - †Corbula coloradoensis
  - †Corbula kennedyi
  - †Corbula marquezensis – type locality for species
  - †Corbula milium
  - †Corbula texana – type locality for species
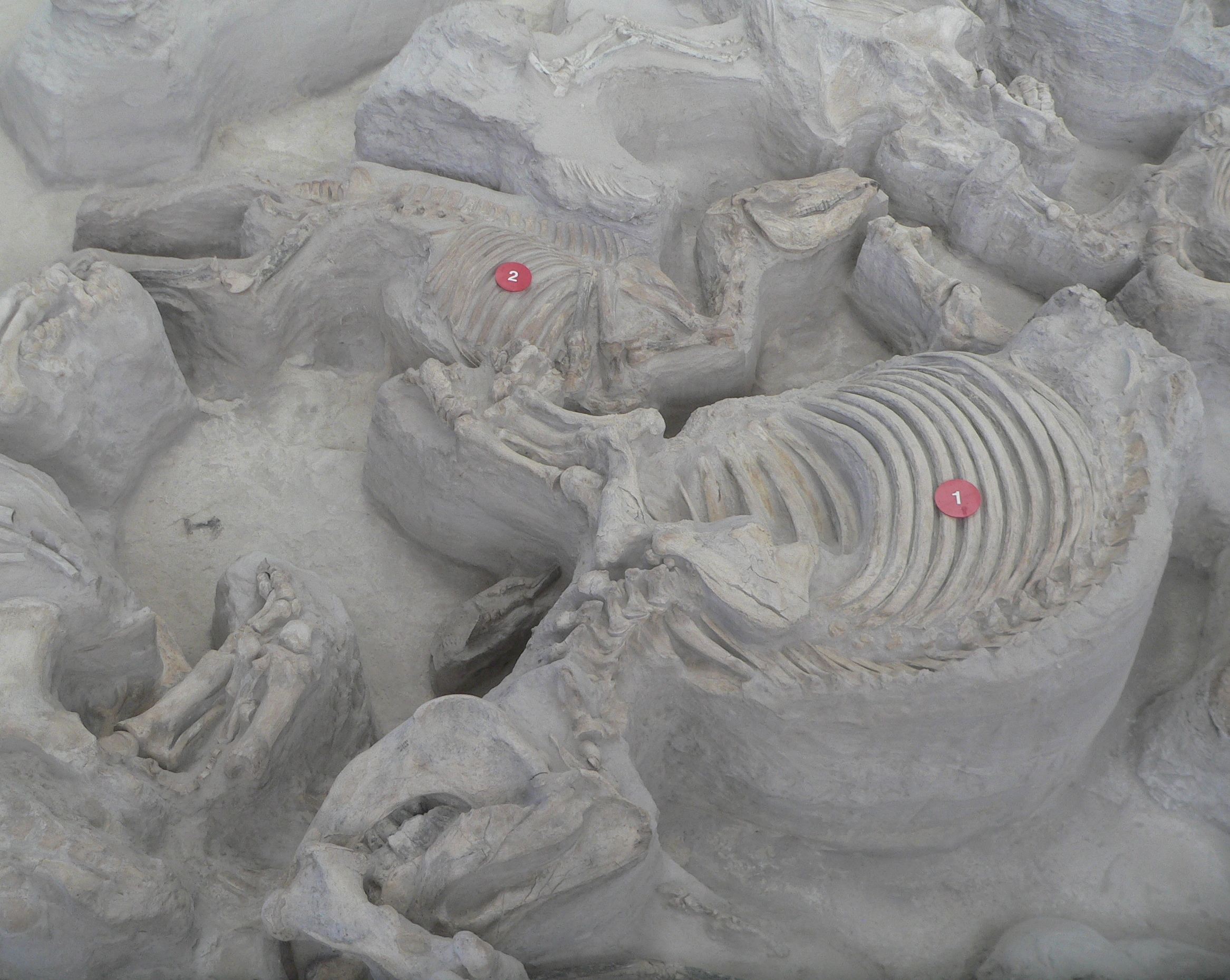
- Fossilized skeleton preserved in situ (upper left, 2) of the Miocene-Pliocene horse Cormohipparion
  †Cormohipparion
  - †Cormohipparion fricki – type locality for species
  - †Cormohipparion goorisi
  - †Cormohipparion ingenuum – type locality for species
  - †Cormohipparion skinneri – type locality for species
- †Cornulina
  - †Cornulina armigera
  - †Cornulina dalli
  - †Cornulina minax – type locality for species
- †Coronia
  - †Coronia alternata
  - †Coronia anacona
  - †Coronia childreni
  - †Coronia genitiva
  - †Coronia margaritosa
  - †Coronia mediavia
  - †Coronia nodoidea
  - †Coronia nucleata
  - †Coronia ostrarupis
  - †Coronia sublerchi
  - †Coronia taylori – type locality for species
- †Corvina
  - †Corvina intermedia
- Corvus
  - †Corvus brachyrhynchos
- †Coryphodon
  - †Coryphodon armatus
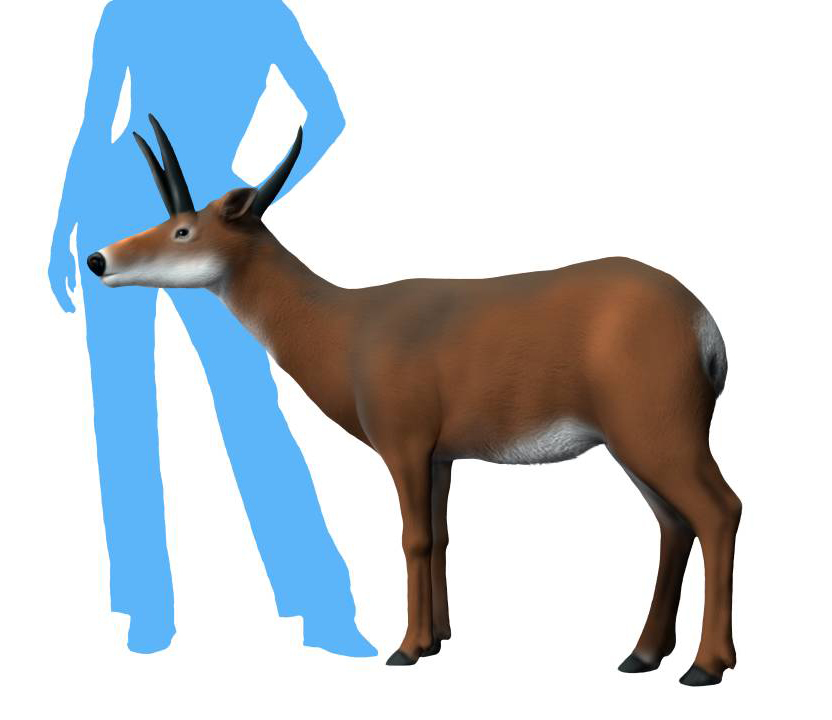
- Restoration of the Miocene palaeomerycid Cranioceras, a relative of modern deer, with anachronistic human to scale
  †Cranioceras
  - †Cranioceras teres – type locality for species
- Crassatella
  - †Crassatella antestriata
  - †Crassatella gabbi
  - †Crassatella ioannes
  - †Crassatella texalta
  - †Crassatella texana
  - †Crassatella trapaquara
- Crassinella
  - †Crassinella aldrichi
  - †Crassinella minor
  - †Crassinella pteleina
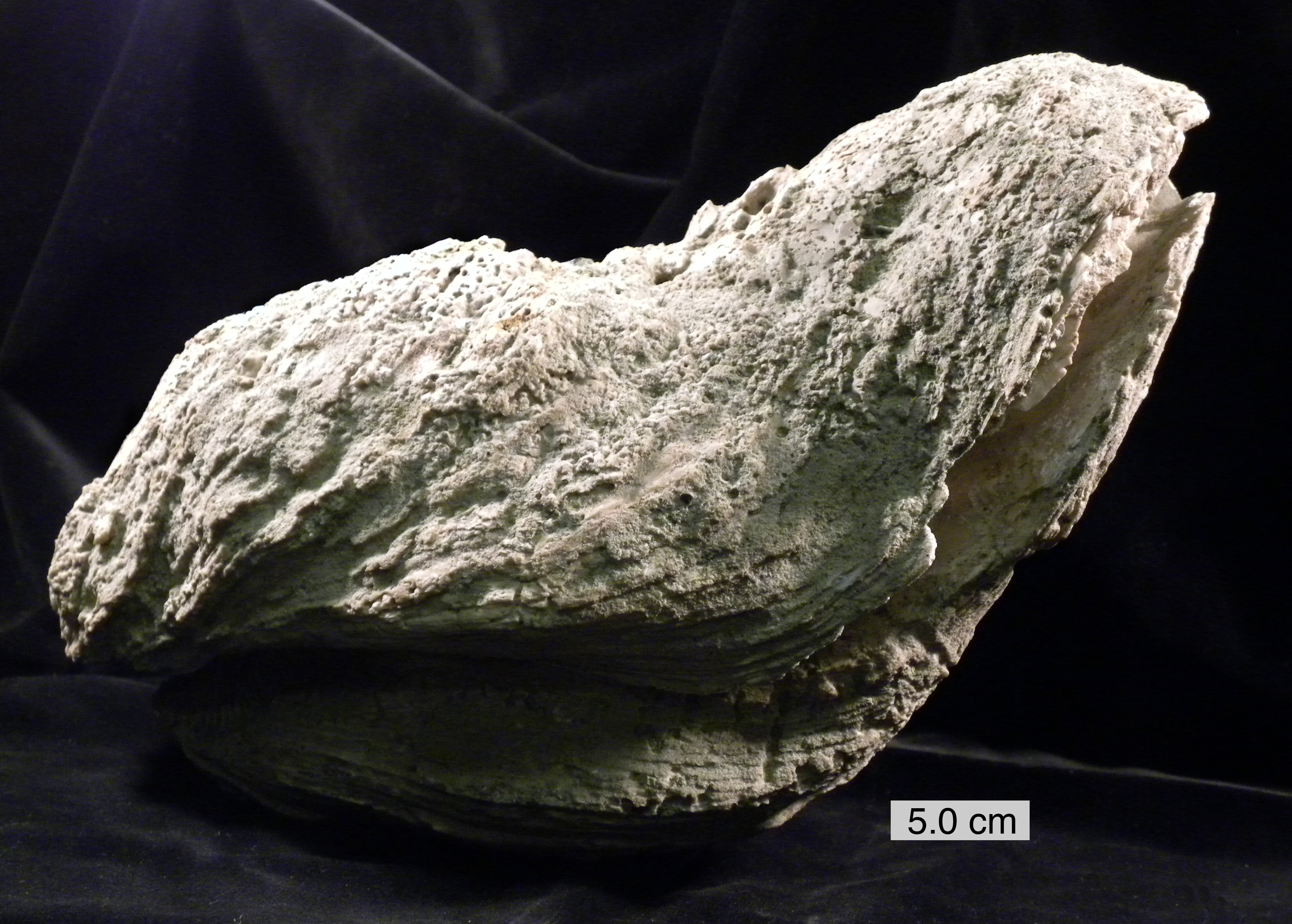
- Fossilized shell of the Cretaceous-modern oyster Crassostrea
  Crassostrea
  - †Crassostrea amichel
  - †Crassostrea contracta
  - †Crassostrea frionis
- Cratogeomys
  - †Cratogeomys castanops
- Crenella
  - †Crenella margaritacea
- †Crenodonta
  - †Crenodonta perplicata
- †Creonella
- Creseis
- †Cristellaria
  - †Cristellaria orelliana
  - †Cristellaria rotulata
  - †Cristellaria torrida
- Crotalus
  - †Crotalus atrox
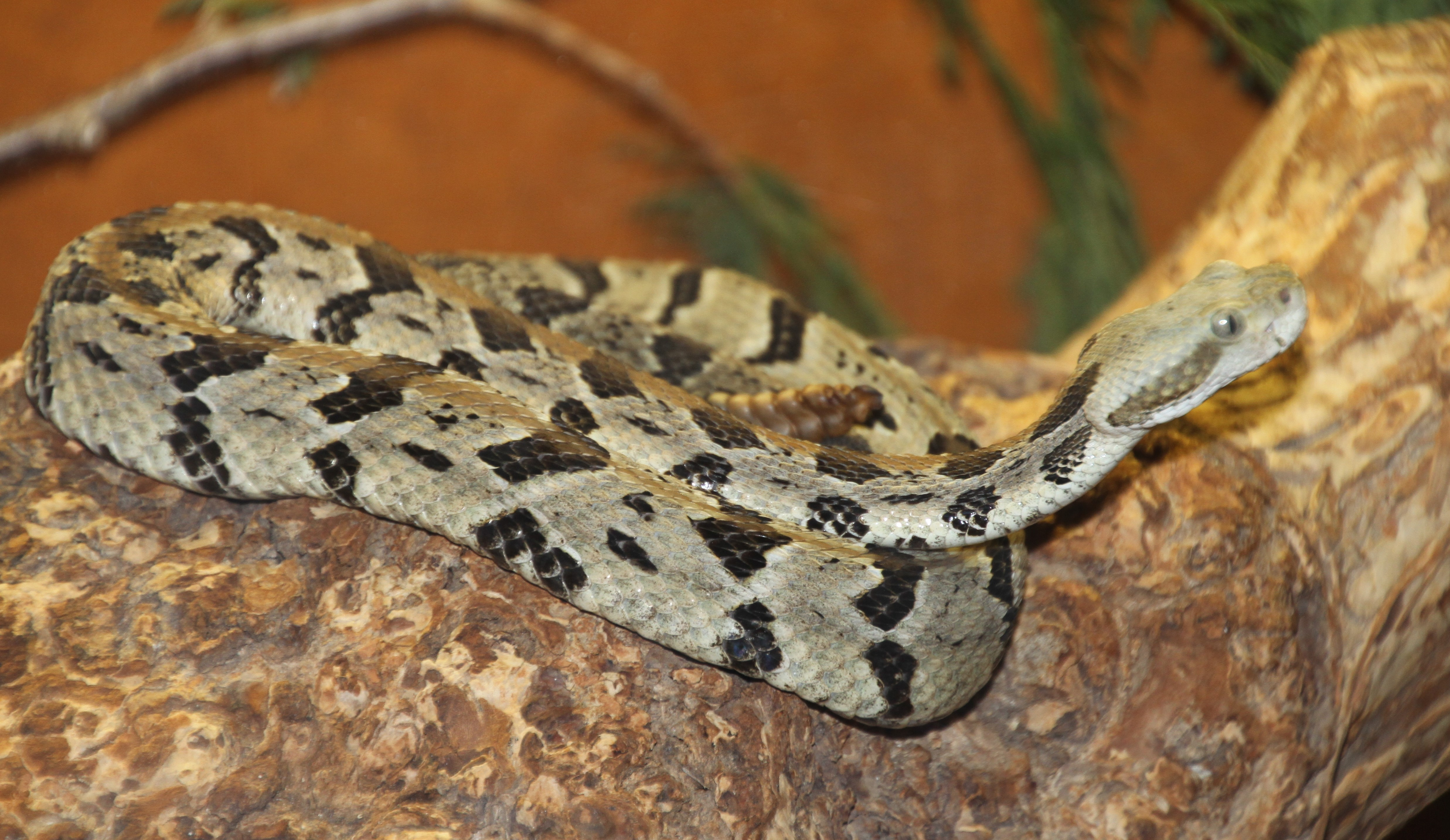
  - A living Crotalus horridus, or timber rattlesnake
    †Crotalus horridus
- Crotaphytus
  - †Crotaphytus collaris
  - †Crotaphytus reticulatus
- †Cryptochorda
  - †Cryptochorda eureia
  - †Cryptochorda stenostoma
- Cryptotis
  - †Cryptotis parva
- Ctenoides
  - †Ctenoides bastropensis
- †Cubitostrea
  - †Cubitostrea divaricata
  - †Cubitostrea lisbonensis
  - †Cubitostrea petropolitana
  - †Cubitostrea sanctiaugustini
  - †Cubitostrea sellaeformis
  - †Cubitostrea smithvillensis
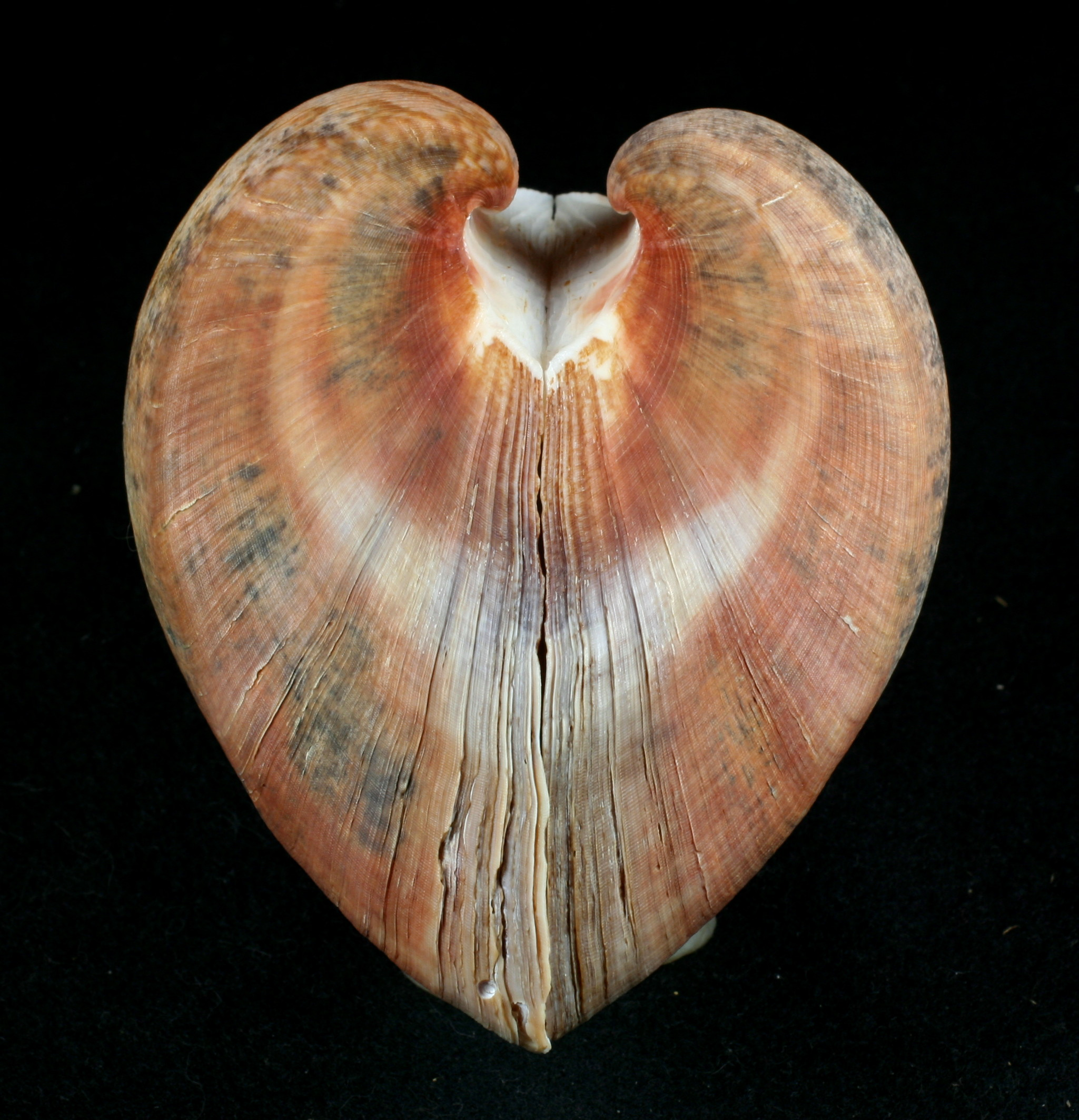
- Shell of a Cucullaea, or false ark shell
  Cucullaea
  - †Cucullaea kaufmanensis
  - †Cucullaea macrodonta
  - †Cucullaea saffordi
  - †Cucullaea texana
- Culex
- Cuna
- †Cuneocorbula
  - †Cuneocorbula subengonata
- †Cupanites
  - †Cupanites formosus
- †Cupidinimus
- Cuspidaria
  - †Cuspidaria grandis
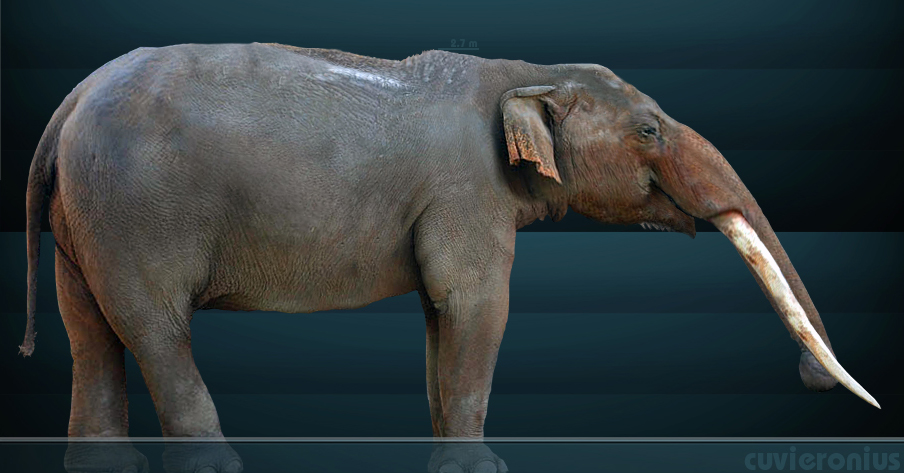
- Life restoration of the Pliocene-Holocene elephant relative Cuvieronius
  †Cuvieronius
- Cyclammina
- Cyclostremiscus
  - †Cyclostremiscus axacuus
  - †Cyclostremiscus dalli
  - †Cyclostremiscus exacuus
  - †Cyclostremiscus sylvaerupis
- Cylichna
  - †Cylichna bicarinata – type locality for species
- †Cylindracanthus
- †Cylindrodon
- Cyllene – or unidentified comparable form
  - †Cyllene bellana
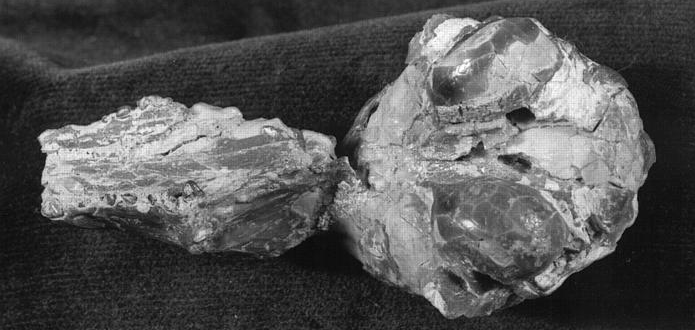
- Underside of a fossilized cranium of the Oligocene-Miocene bone-crushing dog Cynarctoides
  †Cynarctoides
  - †Cynarctoides whistleri
- †Cynarctus
  - †Cynarctus crucidens
- Cynomys
  - †Cynomys ludovicianus
  - †Cynomys spenceri
- Cypraea
- Cypraedia
  - †Cypraedia subcancellata – type locality for species
- †Cypraeorbis
  - †Cypraeorbis bulbus – type locality for species
- Cypridopsis
  - †Cypridopsis vidua
- Cythara
  - †Cythara schotti
- Cythere
  - †Cythere claiborniana
  - †Cythere evergreenica
  - †Cythere leeana
  - †Cythere orelliana
  - †Cythere texana
- †Cythereis
  - †Cythereis bursilloides
  - †Cythereis davidwhitei
  - †Cythereis elmana
  - †Cythereis elongata – type locality for species
  - †Cythereis fragillissima – type locality for species
  - †Cythereis hilgardi
  - †Cythereis linospinosa – type locality for species
  - †Cythereis montgomeryensis
  - †Cythereis quinquespinosa – type locality for species
  - †Cythereis reklawensis – type locality for species
  - †Cythereis russelli
  - †Cythereis sinuata – type locality for species
  - †Cythereis smithvillensis – type locality for species
  - †Cythereis spinosa – type locality for species
  - †Cythereis splendens – type locality for species
  - †Cythereis uptonensis – type locality for species
  - †Cythereis washburni – type locality for species
- Cytherella
  - †Cytherella fimbricinctus – type locality for species
  - †Cytherella texana
- Cytheridea
  - †Cytheridea compressa – type locality for species
  - †Cytheridea habropapillosa – type locality for species
  - †Cytheridea mulleri
  - †Cytheridea subovata – type locality for species
  - †Cytheridea subpyriformis – type locality for species
- Cytheropteron
  - †Cytheropteron minutum – type locality for species
  - †Cytheropteron virgineum

== D ==
- †Dakotaophis
  - †Dakotaophis greeni
- †Daphoenictis
- †Daphoenodon
  - †Daphoenodon notionastes
- †Daphoenus
  - †Daphoenus lambei – or unidentified comparable form
- Dasyatis
- Dasypus
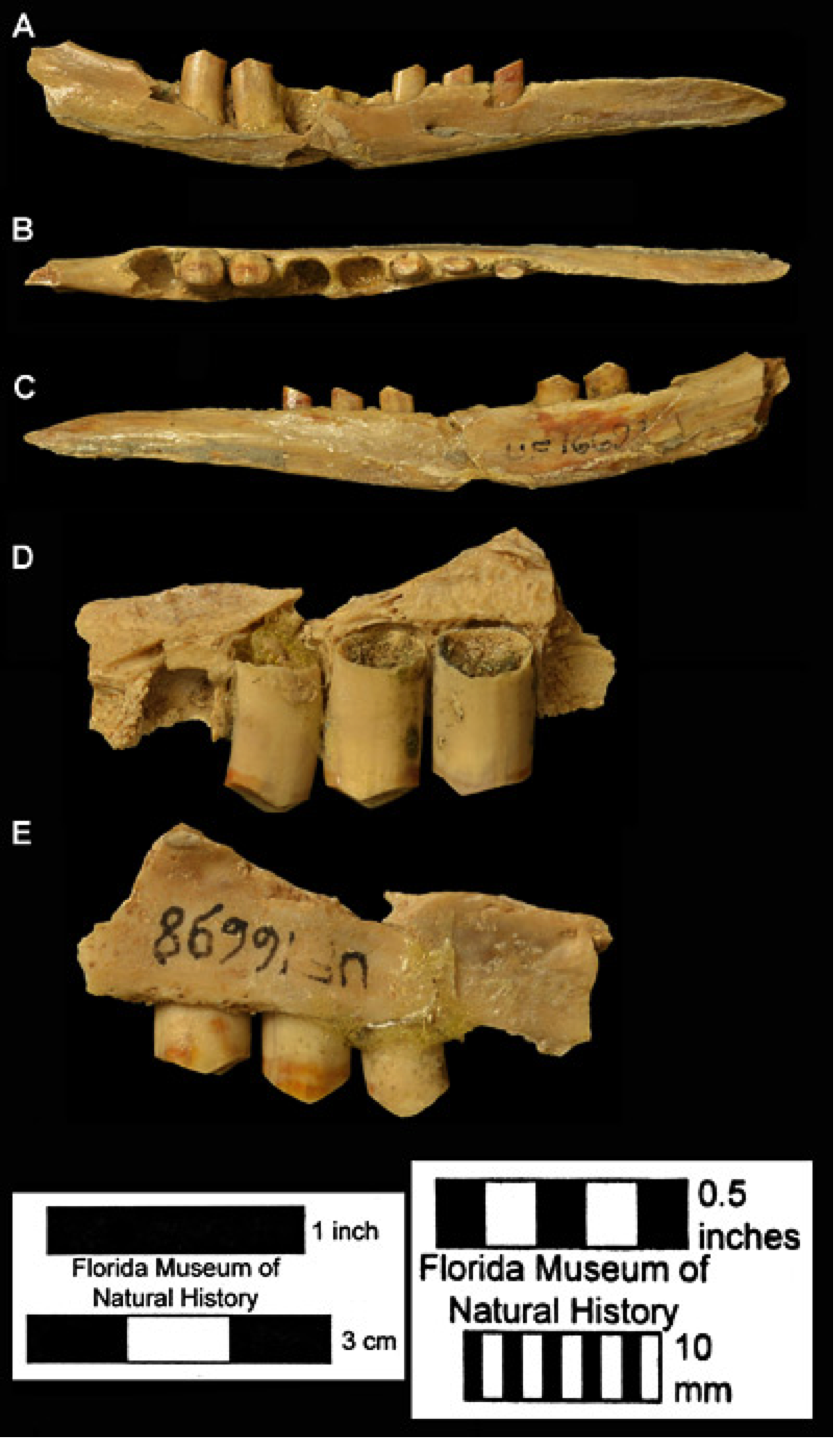
  - Fossilized mandible in multiple views of the Pleistocene Dasypus bellus, or beautiful armadillo
    †Dasypus bellus
- †Delahomeryx
  - †Delahomeryx browni – type locality for species
- Dentalium
  - †Dentalium mediaviense
  - †Dentalium palmerae – type locality for species
  - †Dentalium thalloides – or unidentified related form
- Dermatemys
- †Desmatippus
  - †Desmatippus texanus
- †Diablomomys – type locality for genus
  - †Diablomomys dalquesti – type locality for species
- †Diaphyodus
  - †Diaphyodus wilsoni – type locality for species
- †Dibelodon
  - †Dibelodon praecursor
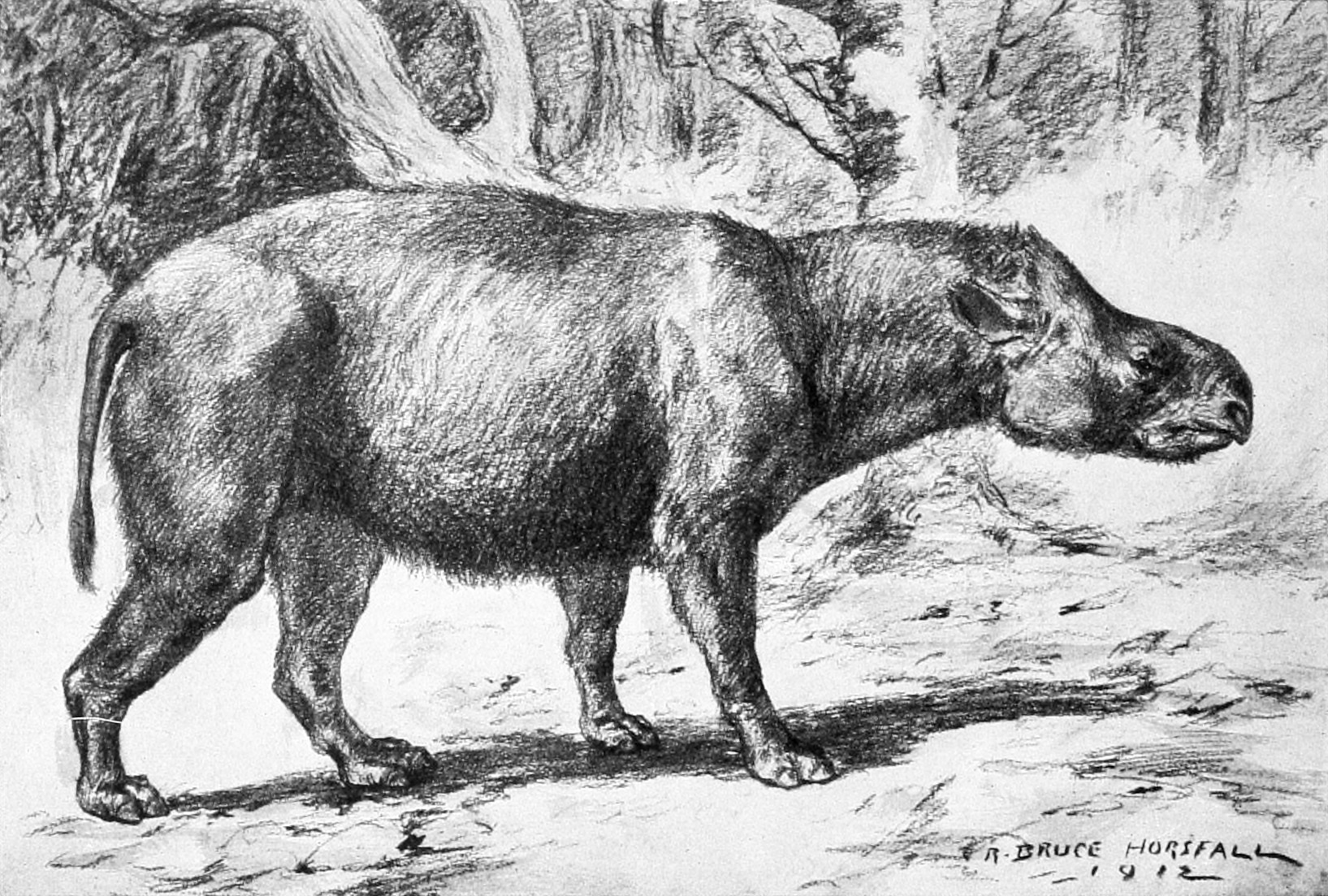
- Restoration of the Oligocene-Miocene hornless rhinoceros Diceratherium. Robert Bruce Horsfall (1913).
  †Diceratherium
  - †Diceratherium annectens
  - †Diceratherium armatum
- Didelphis
  - †Didelphis marsupialis
- †Dillenites
  - †Dillenites microdentatus
  - †Dillenites texensis
- †Dinofelis
  - †Dinofelis palaeoonca
- †Dinohippus
  - †Dinohippus interpolatus – type locality for species
  - †Dinohippus mexicanus – or unidentified comparable form
- †Dinohyus
  - †Dinohyus hollandi
- Diplodonta
  - †Diplodonta anterproductus
  - †Diplodonta petropolitana
  - †Diplodonta satex
- Diplotaxis – or unidentified comparable form
- Dipodomys
  - †Dipodomys merriami
  - †Dipodomys ordii
  - †Dipodomys pattersoni – type locality for species
  - †Dipodomys spectabilis
- †Dirocerithium
  - †Dirocerithium wechesense
- †Discotrochus
  - †Discotrochus orbignianus
- †Discradisca
  - †Discradisca littigensis
- Disonycha
- †Dolicholatirus
  - †Dolicholatirus harrisi
  - †Dolicholatirus leaensis
  - †Dolicholatirus obtusus
  - †Dolicholatirus singleyi
- †Domenginella
  - †Domenginella ridgei – type locality for species
- †Domingella
  - †Domingella ridgei – type locality for species
- Dorsanum
  - †Dorsanum – type locality for species informal
  - †Dorsanum scalatum
- †Drepanomeryx
  - †Drepanomeryx falciformis
- †Dryophyllum
  - †Dryophyllum tennesseensee
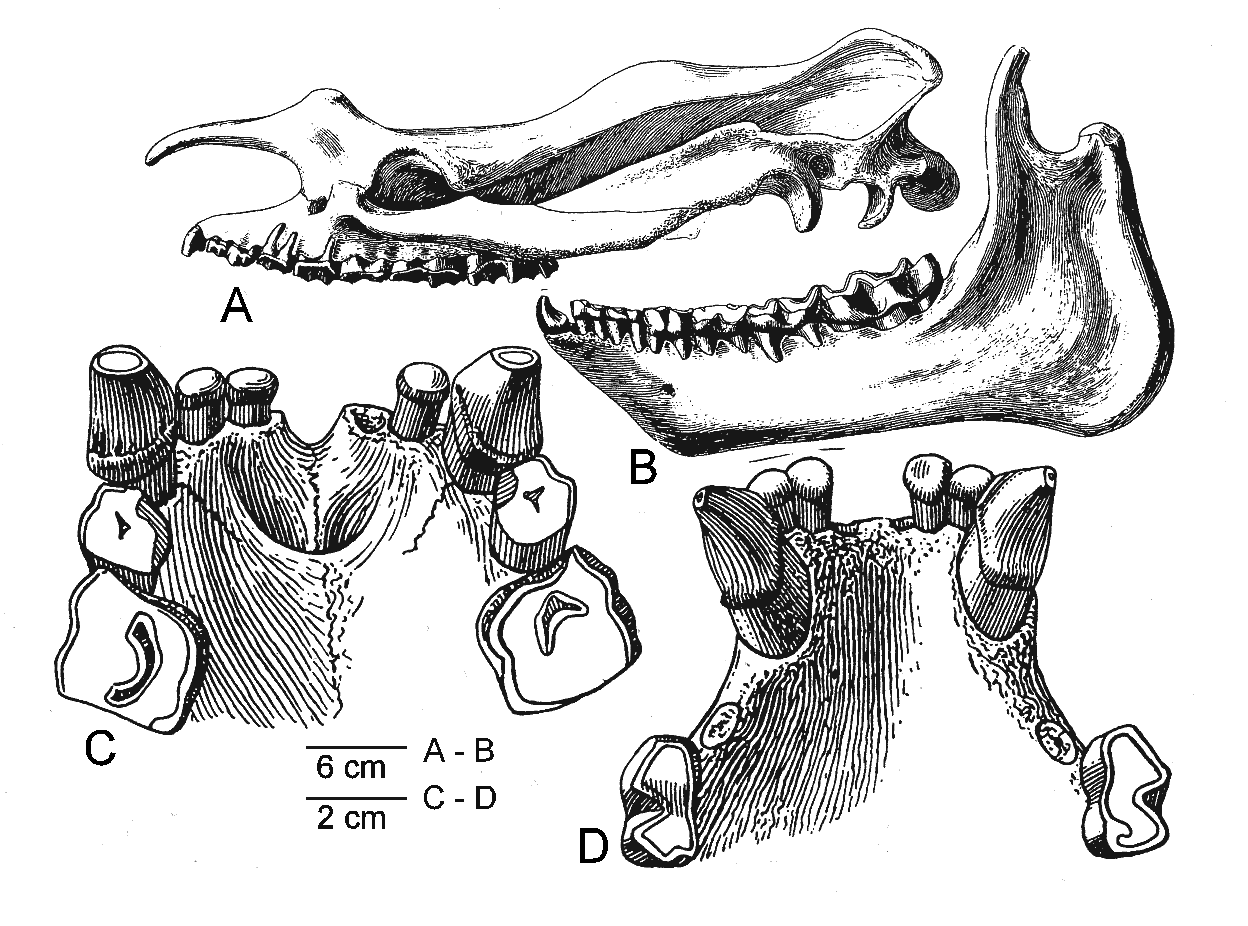
- Illustration of the fossilized jaws and teeth of the Eocene brontothere mammal Duchesneodus
  †Duchesneodus
  - †Duchesneodus uintensis

== E ==
- †Eburneopecten
  - †Eburneopecten scintillatus
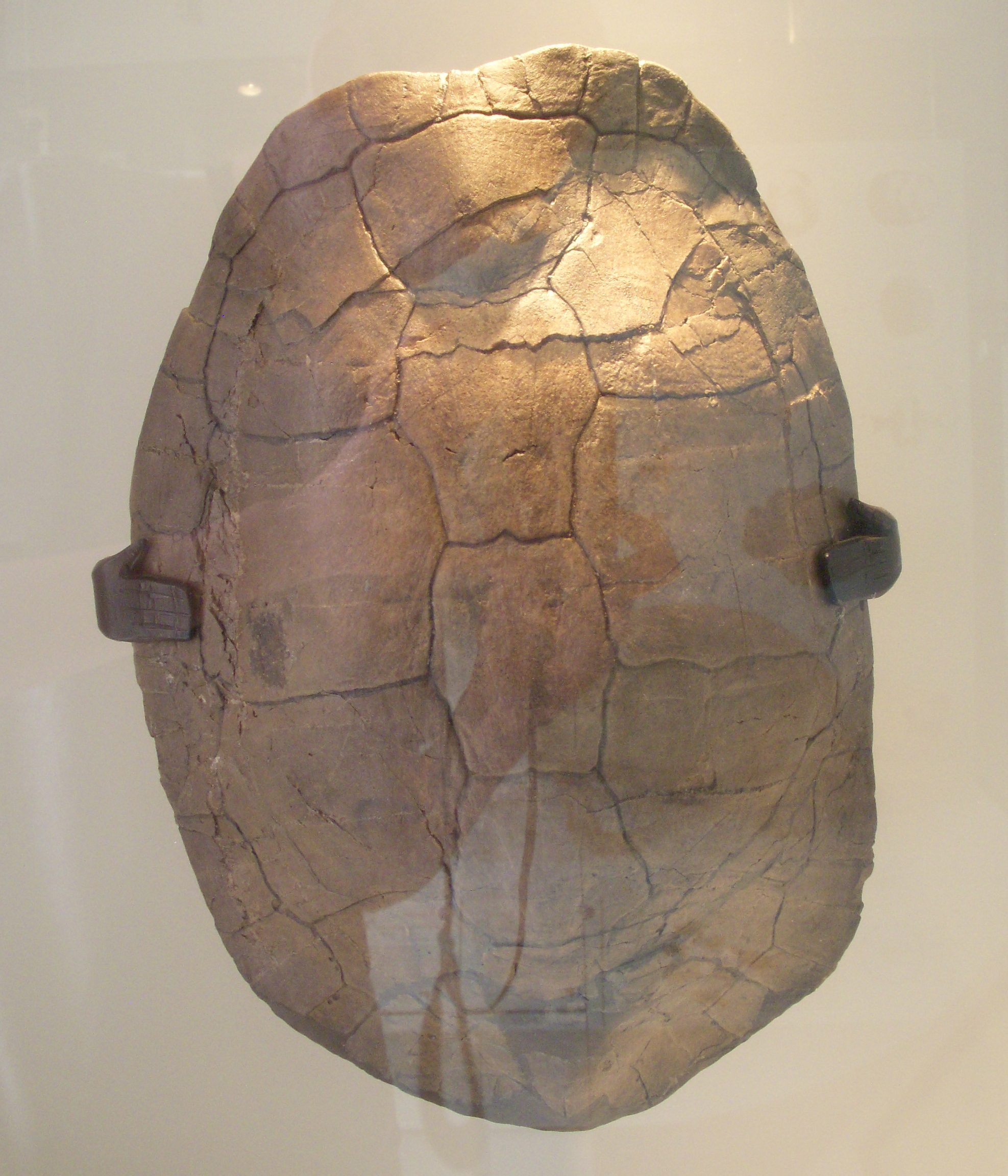
- Fossilized shell of the Eocene turtle Echmatemys
  †Echmatemys
- †Ectypodus
  - †Ectypodus musculus
- †Edaphocyon
  - †Edaphocyon pointblankensis – type locality for species
- †Ekokenia
  - †Ekokenia eporrecta
- Elaphe
  - †Elaphe guttata
  - †Elaphe nebraskensis
  - †Elaphe obsoleta
- Eleutherodactylus
  - †Eleutherodactylus augusti
- †Ellipsechinus
  - †Ellipsechinus prisca
- †Ellisella
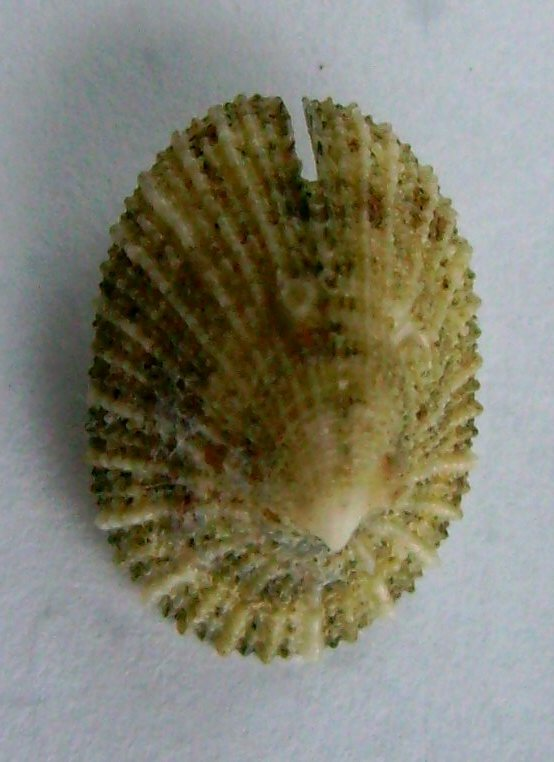
- Shell of an Emarginula keyhole limpet
  Emarginula – or unidentified comparable form
- Endochironomus
- Endopachys
  - †Endopachys maclurii
- Engelhardia
  - †Engelhardia trinitiensis – type locality for species
- †Eoancilla
  - †Eoancilla hordea – type locality for species
- †Eocypraea
  - †Eocypraea estellensis
- †Eocythara – type locality for genus
  - †Eocythara lineata – type locality for species
  - †Eocythara texanum – type locality for species
- †Eodichroma – type locality for genus
  - †Eodichroma mirifica – type locality for species
- †Eodrilla
  - †Eodrilla texana
- †Eodrillia
  - †Eodrillia texana
  - †Eodrillia texanopsis
- †Eomellivora
- †Eopleurotoma
  - †Eopleurotoma bimoniata
  - †Eopleurotoma lisboncola
  - †Eopleurotoma nodocarinata
- †Eosolea – type locality for genus
  - †Eosolea texana – type locality for species
- †Eosurcula
  - †Eosurcula moorei – type locality for species
  - †Eosurcula superpons
- †Eotylopus
  - †Eotylopus reedi – or unidentified comparable form
- Epicauta
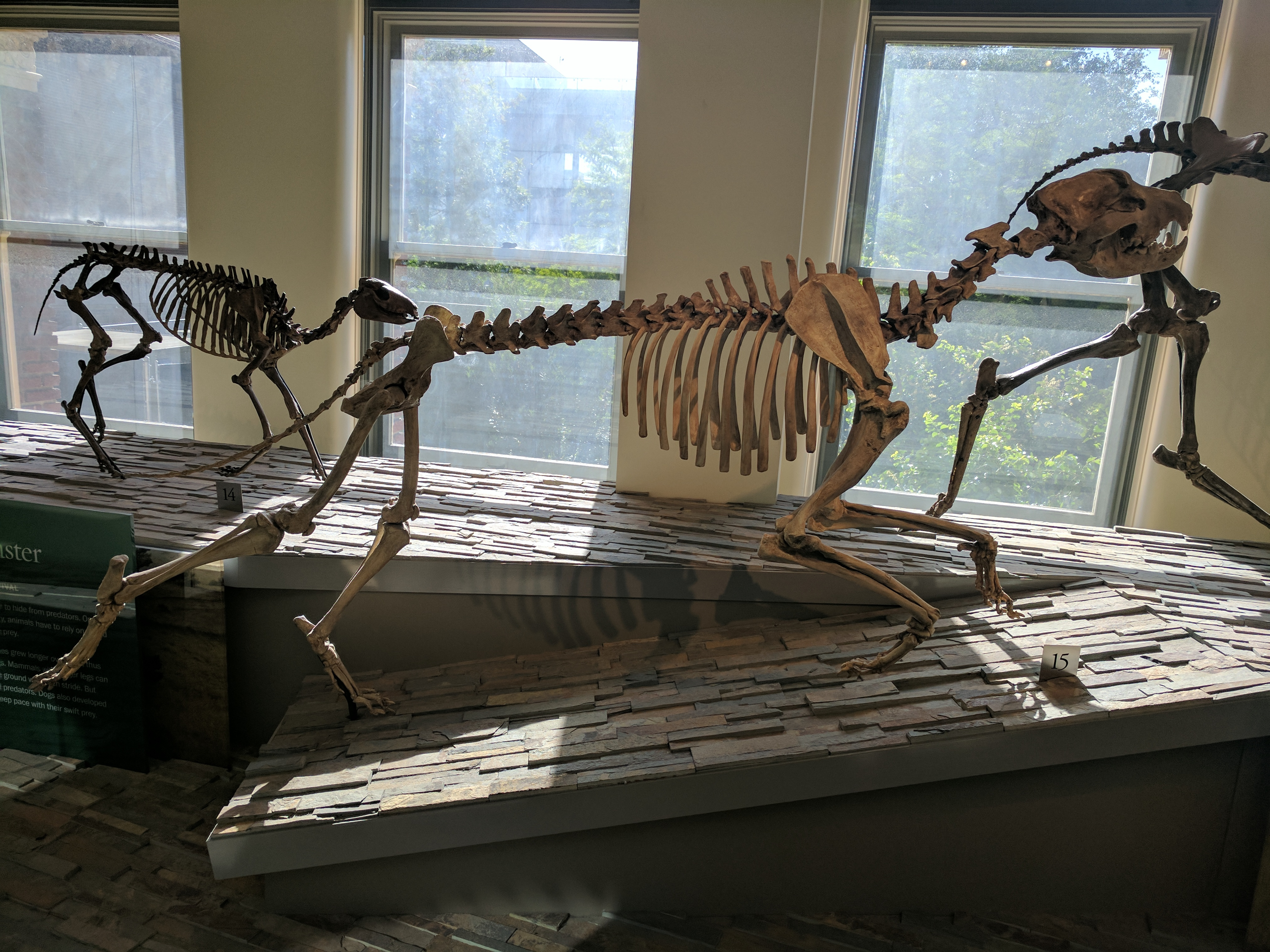
- Mounted fossilized skeleton of the Miocene bone-crushing dog Epicyon
  †Epicyon
  - †Epicyon haydeni
  - †Epicyon saevus
- †Epihippus
  - †Epihippus gracilis
- Epilucina
- Episcynia
  - †Episcynia bastropensis
- Episiphon
  - †Episiphon gracilis – type locality for species
- Epitonium
  - †Epitonium cookii
  - †Epitonium dolosum
  - †Epitonium multiliniferum
- †Epitriplopus
- Eponides
  - †Eponides patelliformis
  - †Eponides texana
- Eptesicus
  - †Eptesicus fuscus
  - †Eptesicus hemphillensis – type locality for species
- Equus
  - †Equus alaskae – or unidentified comparable form
  - †Equus complicatus
  - †Equus conversidens
  - †Equus francisci – type locality for species
  - †Equus giganteus
  - †Equus idahoensis
  - †Equus midlandensis
  - †Equus scotti – type locality for species
  - †Equus semiplicatus
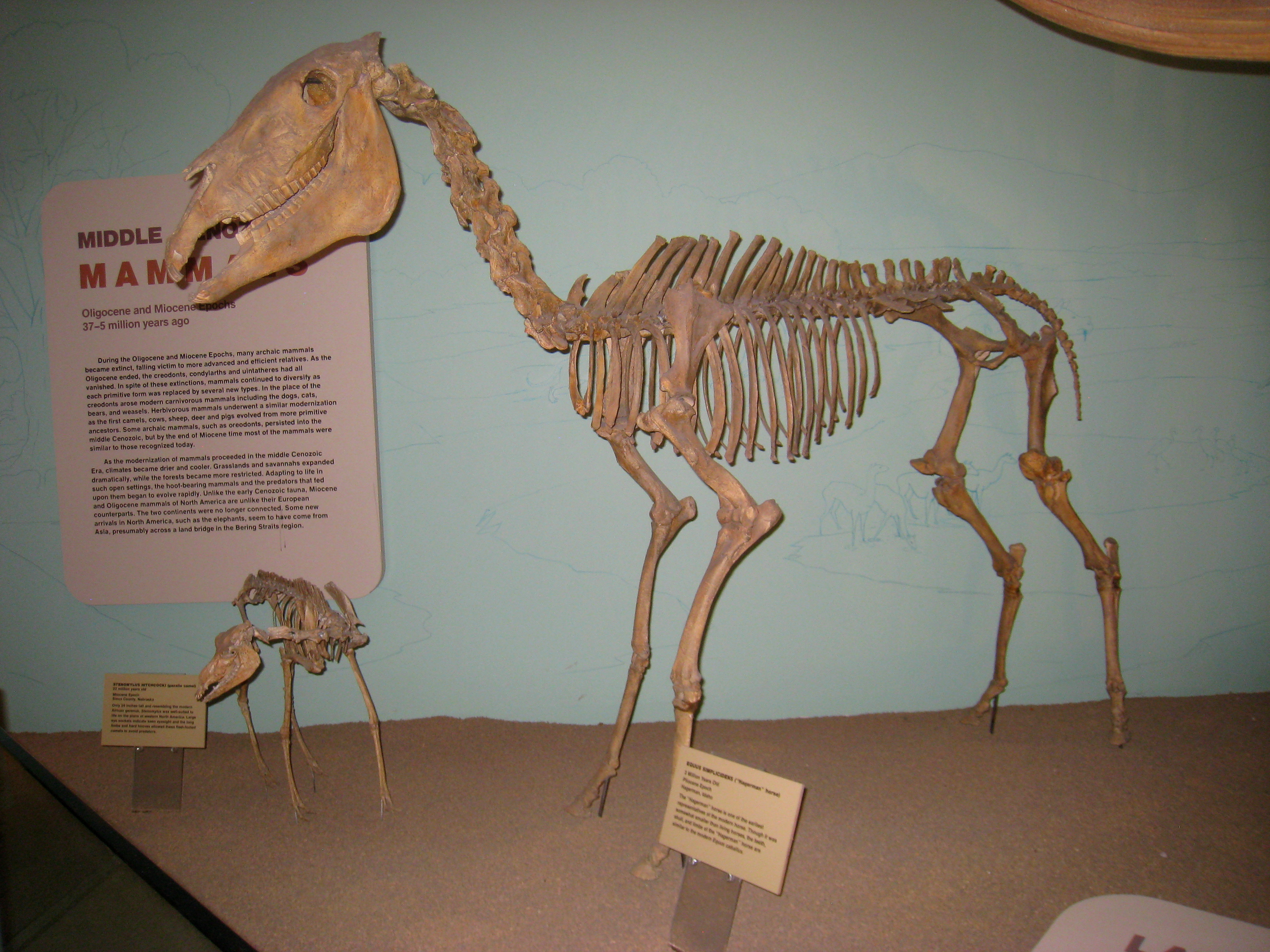
  - Fossilized skeleton of the Pliocene-Pleistocene horse Equus simplicidens, also known as the Hagerman horse or American zebra
    †Equus simplicidens
- Erethizon
  - †Erethizon dorsatum
- †Eucheilodon
  - †Eucheilodon reticulata
- †Eucyon
  - †Eucyon davisi
- Eucytherura
  - †Eucytherura claibornensis – type locality for species
- Eulima
  - †Eulima extremis
  - †Eulima tenaxa
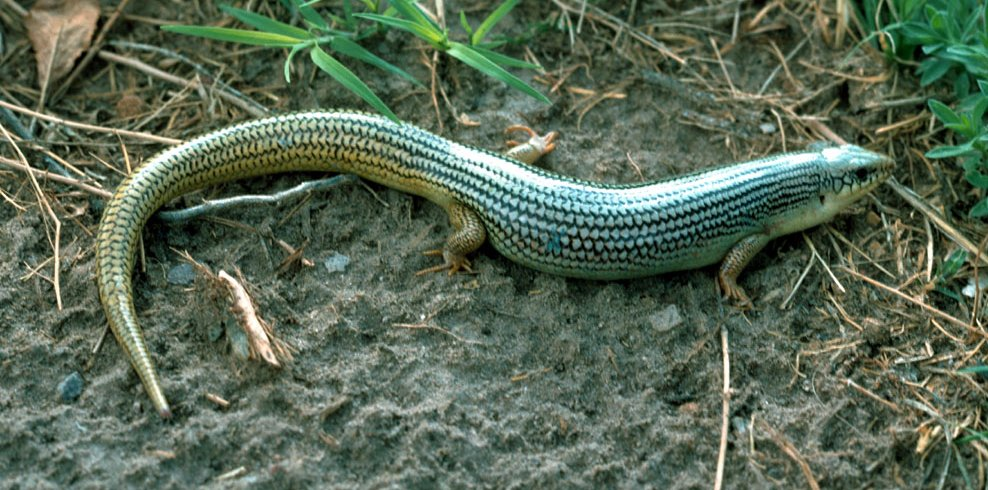
- A living Plestiodon obsoletus (formerly Eumeces obsoletus), or Great Plains skink
  Eumeces
  - †Eumeces fasciatus
  - †Eumeces miobsoletus – type locality for species
  - †Eumeces obsoletus
- †Euonymus
  - †Euonymus glanduliferus
- Eupleura
  - †Eupleura morula
- †Euryochetus
  - †Euryochetus punctatum – type locality for species
- Eurytellina
  - †Eurytellina milamensis – type locality for species
  - †Eurytellina mooreana
  - †Eurytellina papyria
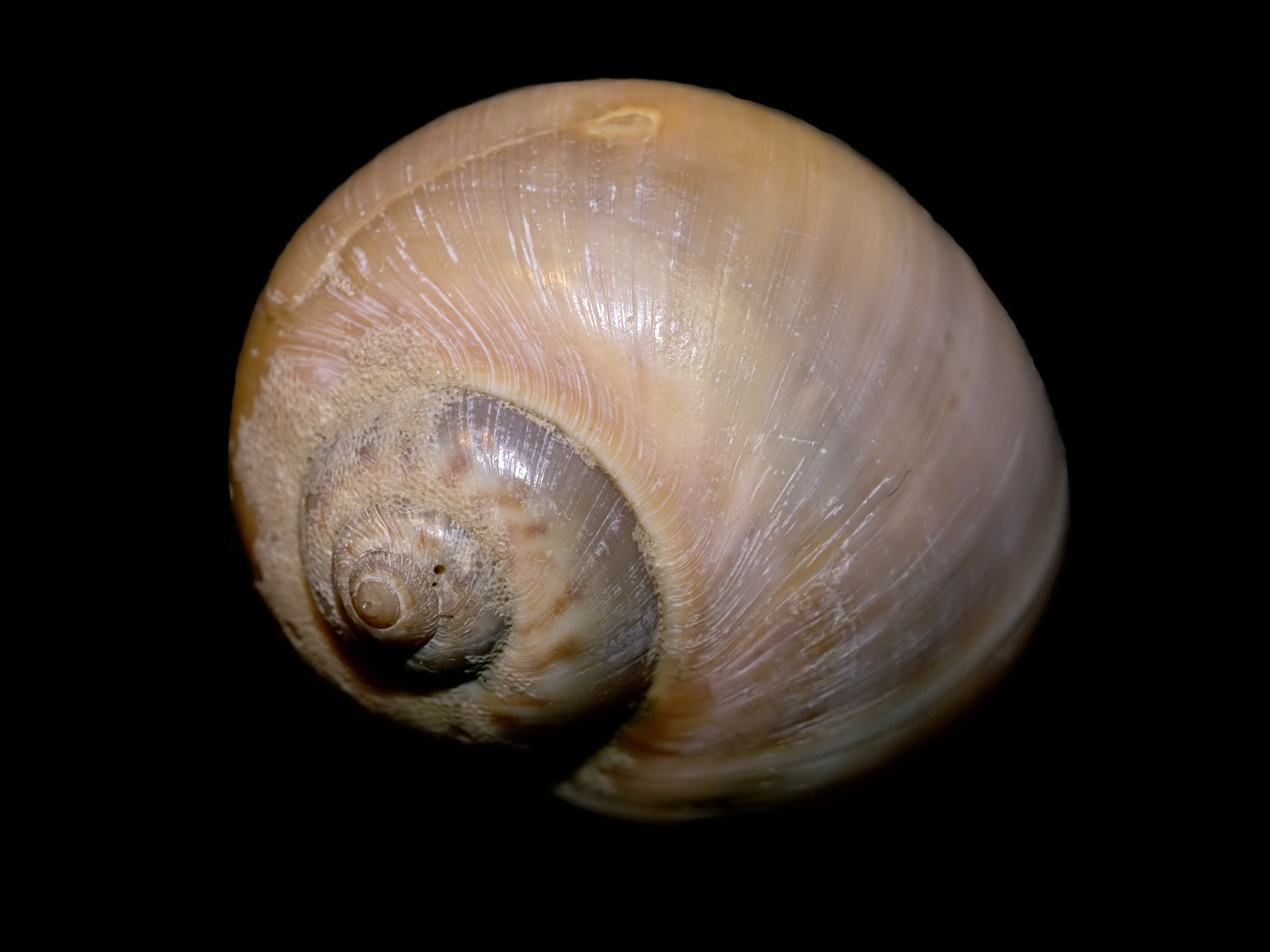
- Shell of a Euspira moon sea snail
  Euspira
  - †Euspira aldrichi
  - †Euspira jacksonensis
  - †Euspira marylandica
  - †Euspira perspecta
- †Eutrephoceras
  - †Eutrephoceras reesidei
- †Eutypomys
  - †Eutypomys inexpectatus – type locality for species
- †Exilia
  - †Exilia pergracilis

== F ==
- Falsifusus
  - †Falsifusus apicalis
  - †Falsifusus bastropensis
  - †Falsifusus harrisi
  - †Falsifusus houstonensis
  - †Falsifusus ludlovicianus
  - †Falsifusus ottonis
  - †Falsifusus perobliquus
  - †Falsifusus tobar
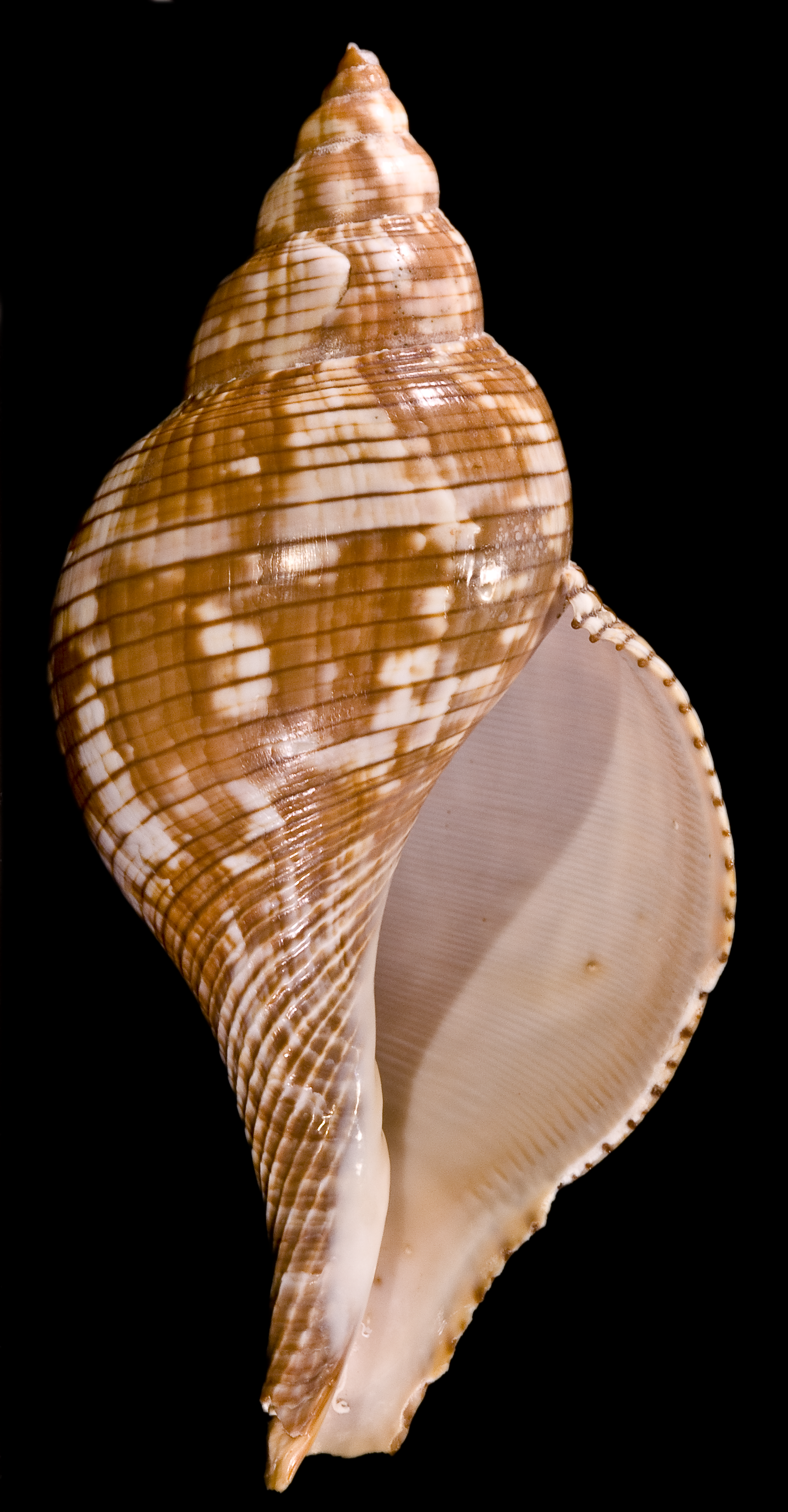
- Shell of a Fasciolaria, or tulip sea snail
  Fasciolaria – tentative report
  - †Fasciolaria plummeri
- Felis
  - †Felis lacustris
  - †Felis rexroadensis
- Fibularia
  - †Fibularia texana
- †Ficopsis
  - †Ficopsis nucleoides – type locality for species
  - †Ficopsis penita
  - †Ficopsis texana
- Ficus
  - †Ficus berryi
  - †Ficus mississippiensis
- †Fimbriatella
  - †Fimbriatella iugum – type locality for species
- Flabellum
  - †Flabellum concoideum
  - †Flabellum conodeum – tentative report
  - †Flabellum conoideum – type locality for species
  - †Flabellum cuneiforme
  - †Flabellum johnsonae
- †Floridachoerus – tentative report
  - †Floridachoerus olseni
- †Floridatragulus
  - †Floridatragulus hesperus
  - †Floridatragulus nanus
  - †Floridatragulus texanus
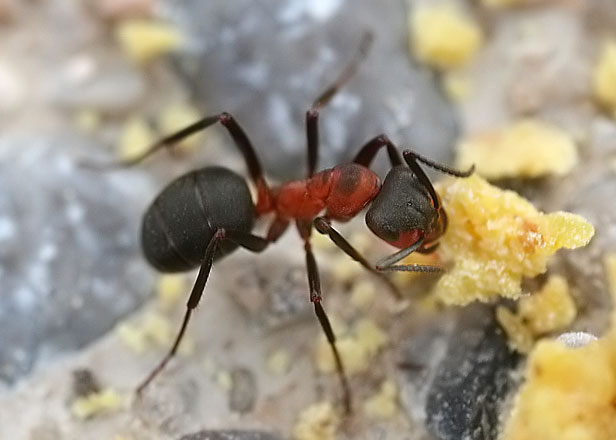
- A living Formica, or wood ant
  Formica
  - †Formica eoptera – type locality for species
- Fossaria
  - †Fossaria dalli
  - †Fossaria obrussa
- Fulgurofusus
  - †Fulgurofusus quercollis
- †Fusconaia
  - †Fusconaia undulata – or unidentified comparable form
- Fusimitra
  - †Fusimitra adamsi
  - †Fusimitra millingtoni
  - †Fusimitra perexilis
  - †Fusimitra polita
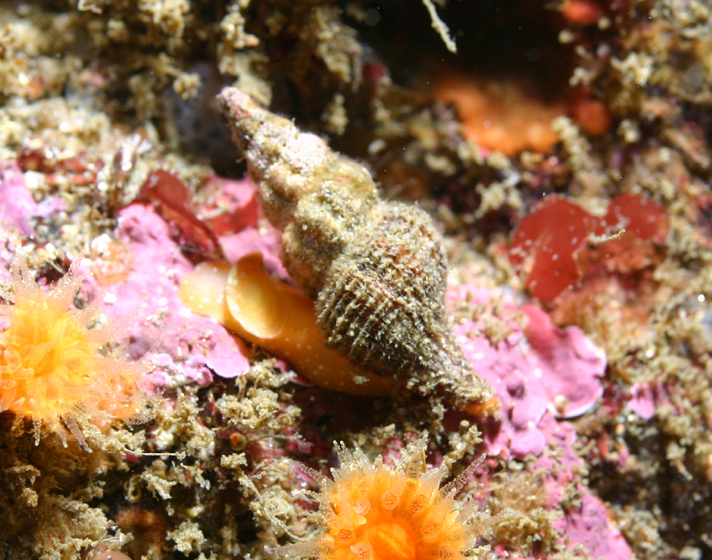
- A living Fusinus sea snail
  Fusinus
  - †Fusinus claibornica – type locality for species
- †Fusoficula
  - †Fusoficula angelinensis
- Fustiaria
  - †Fustiaria aciculata – type locality for species

== G ==
- Gadila
  - †Gadila palmerae
- Galeocerdo
  - †Galeocerdo eaglesomei
  - †Galeocerdo latidens
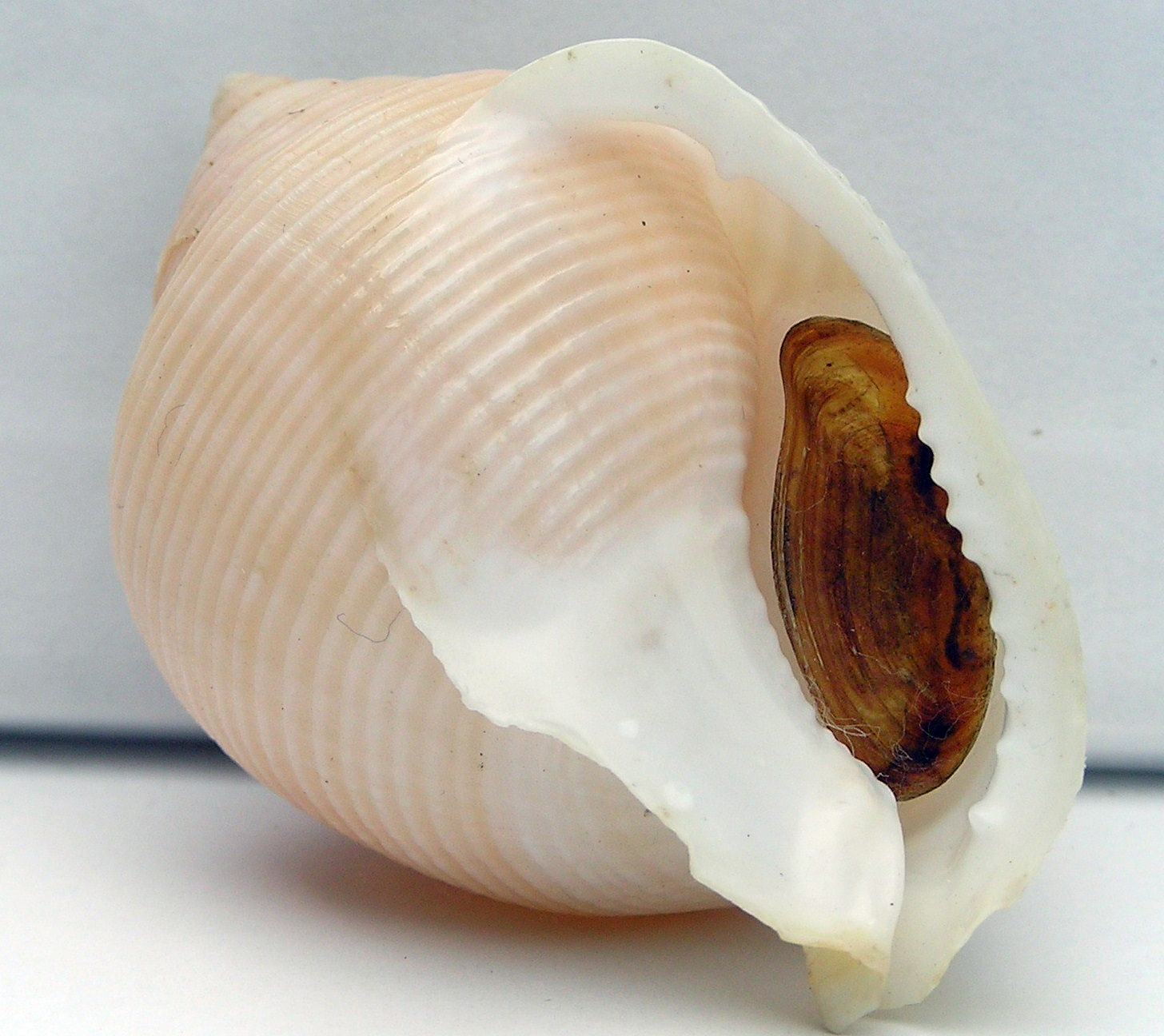
- Shell of a Galeodea helmet snail
  Galeodea
  - †Galeodea dubia
  - †Galeodea koureos
  - †Galeodea petersoni
  - †Galeodea planotecta
- Gastrocopta
  - †Gastrocopta armifera
  - †Gastrocopta contracta
  - †Gastrocopta cristata
  - †Gastrocopta pellicuda
  - †Gastrocopta pellucida
  - †Gastrocopta pentodon
  - †Gastrocopta procera
  - †Gastrocopta tappaniana
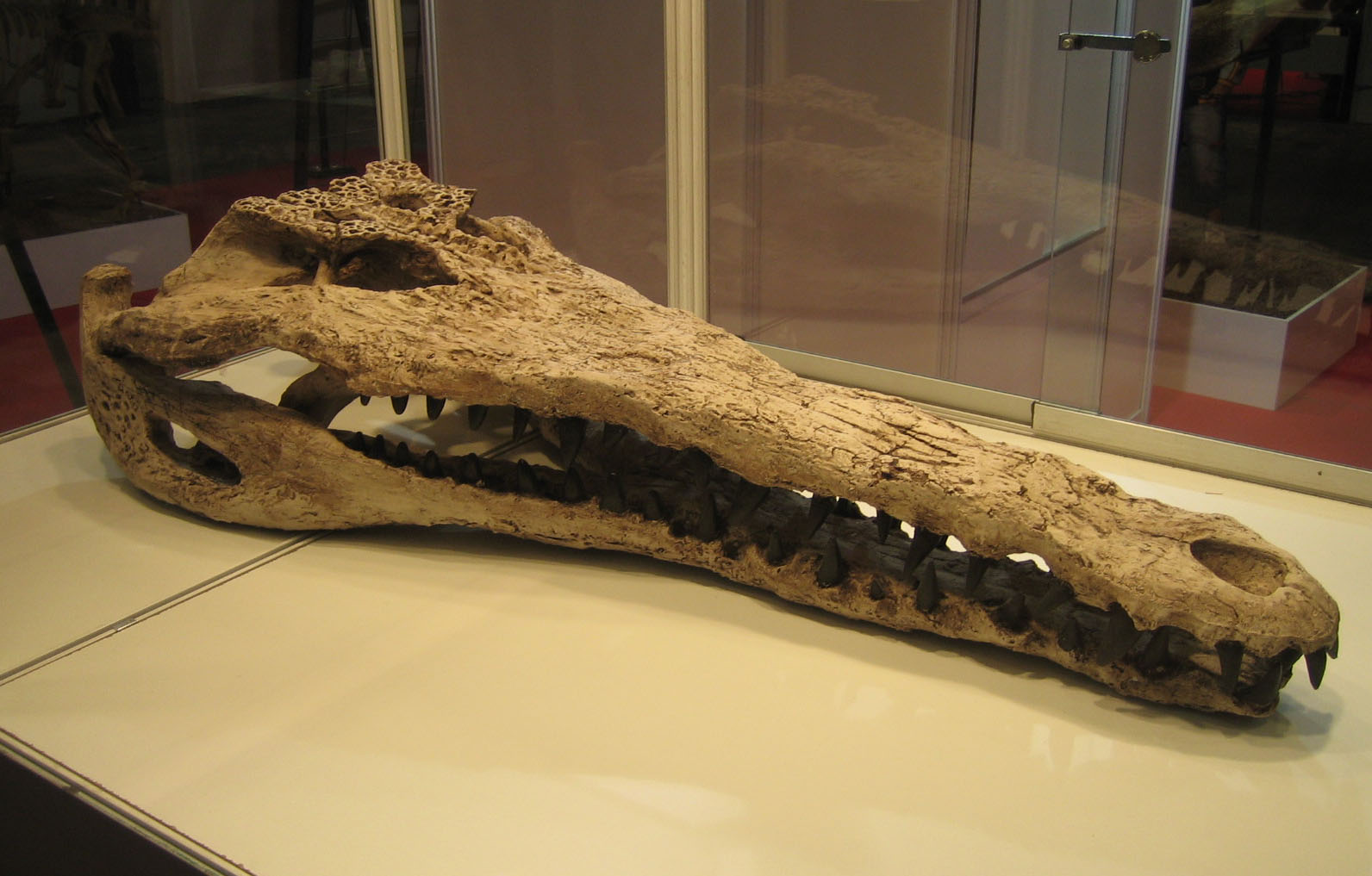
- Fossilized skull of the Miocene crocodile relative Gavialosuchus
  †Gavialosuchus
- Gegania
  - †Gegania antiquata
- †Gelastops
- †Genartina – type locality for genus
  - †Genartina texana – type locality for species
- Geochelone
- Geomys
  - †Geomys bursarius
  - †Geomys minor
  - †Geomys tobinensis
- †Gigantocamelus
  - †Gigantocamelus spatulus
- †Gilbertina
  - †Gilbertina texana
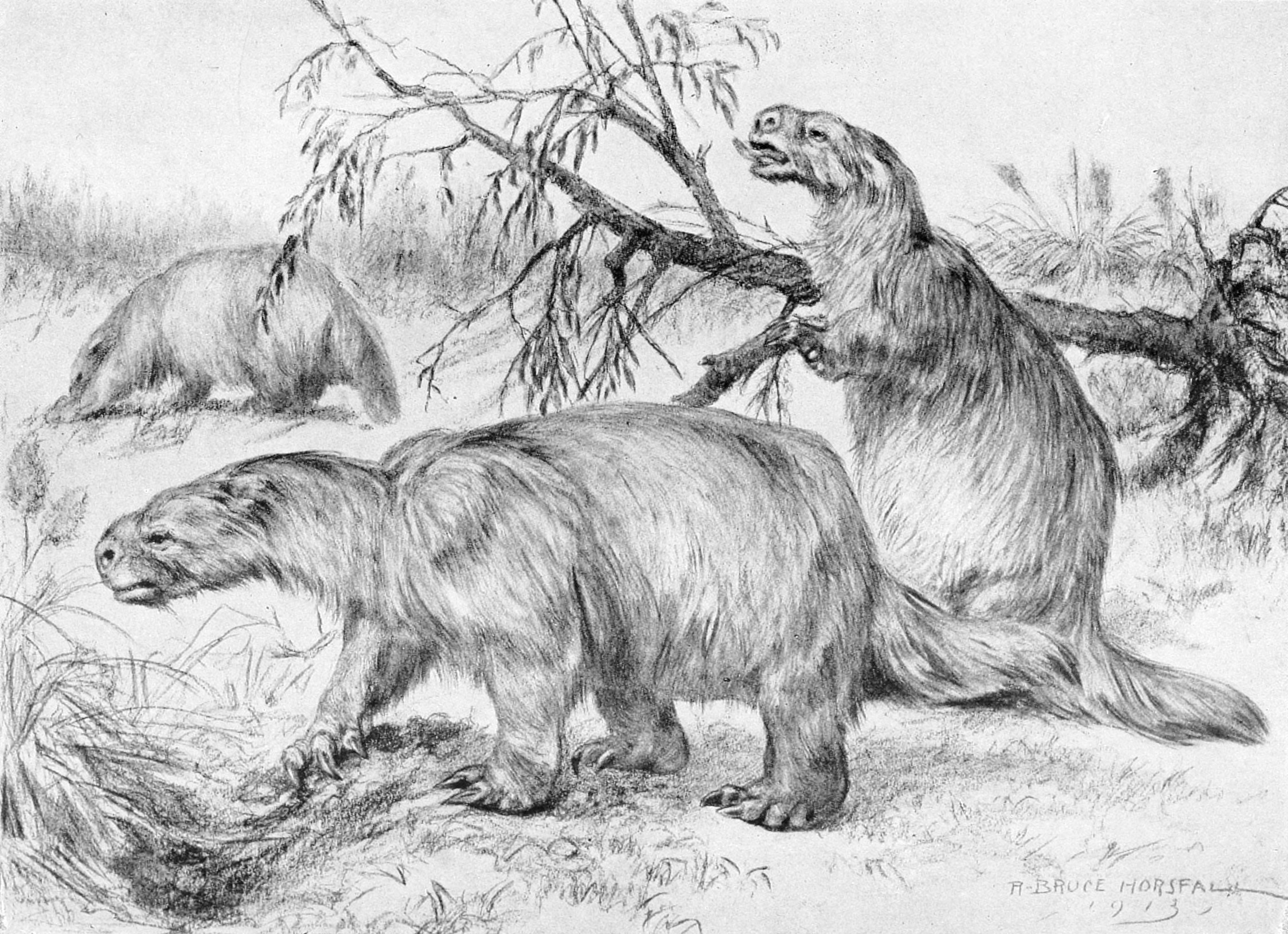
- Restoration of a herd of the Pliocene-Holocene ground sloth Glossotherium
  †Glossotherium
  - †Glossotherium chapadmalense
- †Glottidia
  - †Glottidia antarctica – type locality for species
- Glycymeris
  - †Glycymeris petropolitana
- †Glyphalini
  - †Glyphalini identata
- Glyptoactis
  - †Glyptoactis alticostata
  - †Glyptoactis coloradonis
  - †Glyptoactis crenaea
  - †Glyptoactis eoa
  - †Glyptoactis linguinodifera – type locality for species
  - †Glyptoactis milamensis – type locality for species
  - †Glyptoactis trapaquara
- †Glyptotherium
  - †Glyptotherium cylindricum
  - †Glyptotherium texanum
- †Glyptotoma
  - †Glyptotoma conradiana
  - †Glyptotoma crassiplicata
- Glyptozaria
  - †Glyptozaria americanae – type locality for species
- †Gnathabelodon – only reported species reclassified new genus Blancotherium.
  - †Gnathabelodon buckneri – type locality for species. Later reclassified as Blancotherium buckneri
- †Gomphopages
  - †Gomphopages turneri
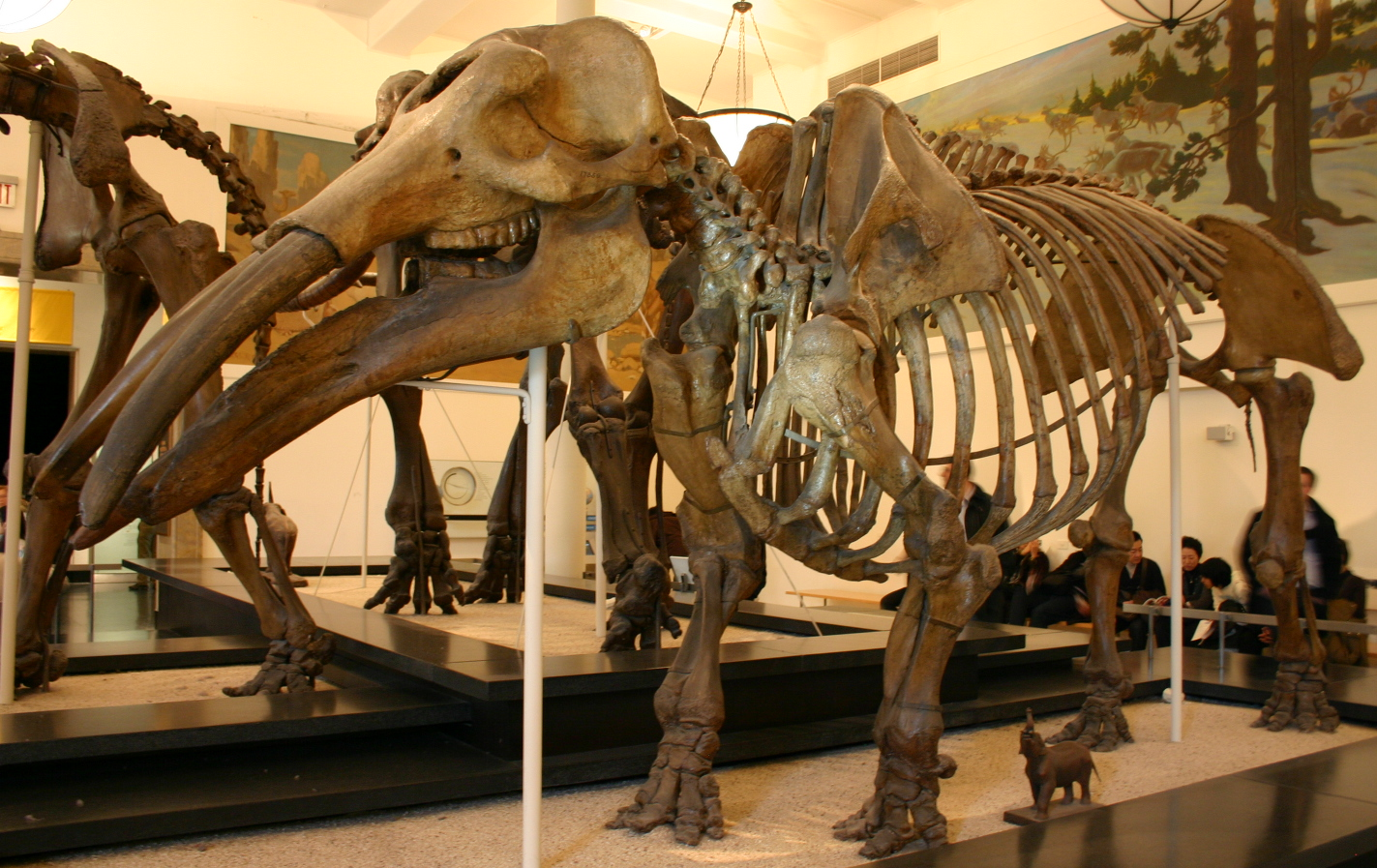
- Mounted fossilized skeleton of the Miocene-Pleistocene elephant relative Gomphotherium
  †Gomphotherium
  - †Gomphotherium gratum – type locality for species
  - †Gomphotherium obscurum
- †Goniobasis
  - †Goniobasis miocaenica
- Gopherus – type locality for genus
  - †Gopherus canyonensis – type locality for species
  - †Gopherus hexagonatus
  - †Gopherus polyphemus – type locality for species
- †Granocardium
- Graptemys
  - †Graptemys geographica
- Gregariella
  - †Gregariella ridgei – type locality for species
- †Gregorymys
  - †Gregorymys riograndensis – type locality for species
- †Gulfoceras
  - †Gulfoceras westfalli – type locality for species
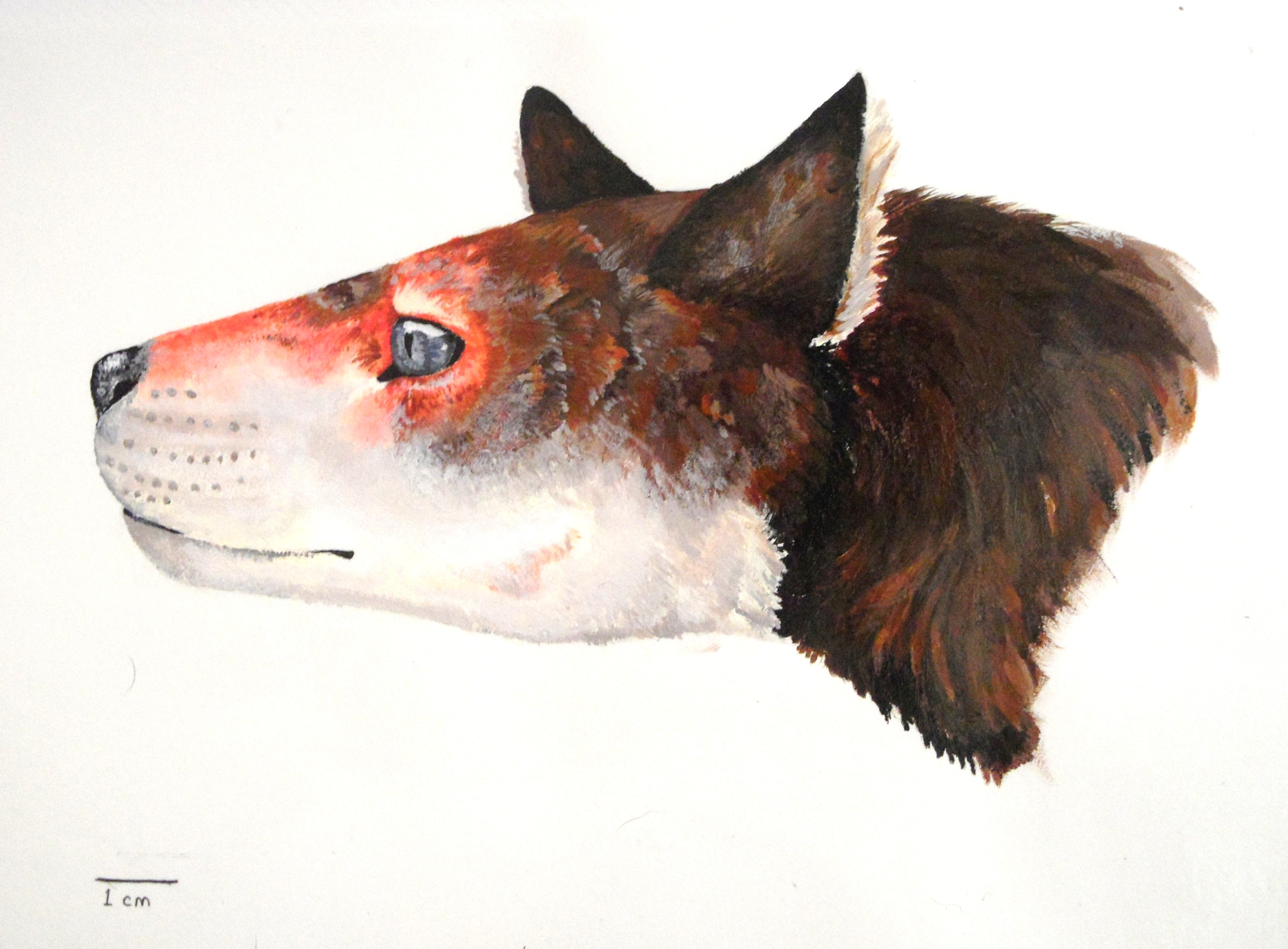
- Restorative portrait of the Eocene-Oligocene bear dog Gustafsonia
  †Gustafsonia
  - †Gustafsonia cognita
- Guttulina
  - †Guttulina problema
- Gyraulus
  - †Gyraulus circumstriatus
  - †Gyraulus parvus

== H ==
- †Hadrianus
- †Haimesiastraea
  - †Haimesiastraea conferta
- †Haplaletes
  - †Haplaletes disceptatrix
- †Haploconus
  - †Haploconus angustus
- Haplocytheridea
  - †Haplocytheridea habropapillosa
  - †Haplocytheridea lisbonensis
  - †Haplocytheridea stenzeli
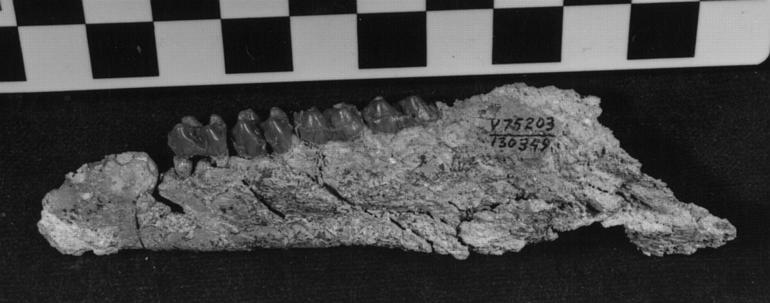
- Fossilized mandible of the Eocene horse Haplohippus
  †Haplohippus
  - †Haplohippus texanus
- Harpa
- †Harpactocarcinus
  - †Harpactocarcinus americanus
  - †Harpactocarcinus rathbunnae
- †Harpagolestes
  - †Harpagolestes uintensis
- †Harrisianella
  - †Harrisianella plicifera
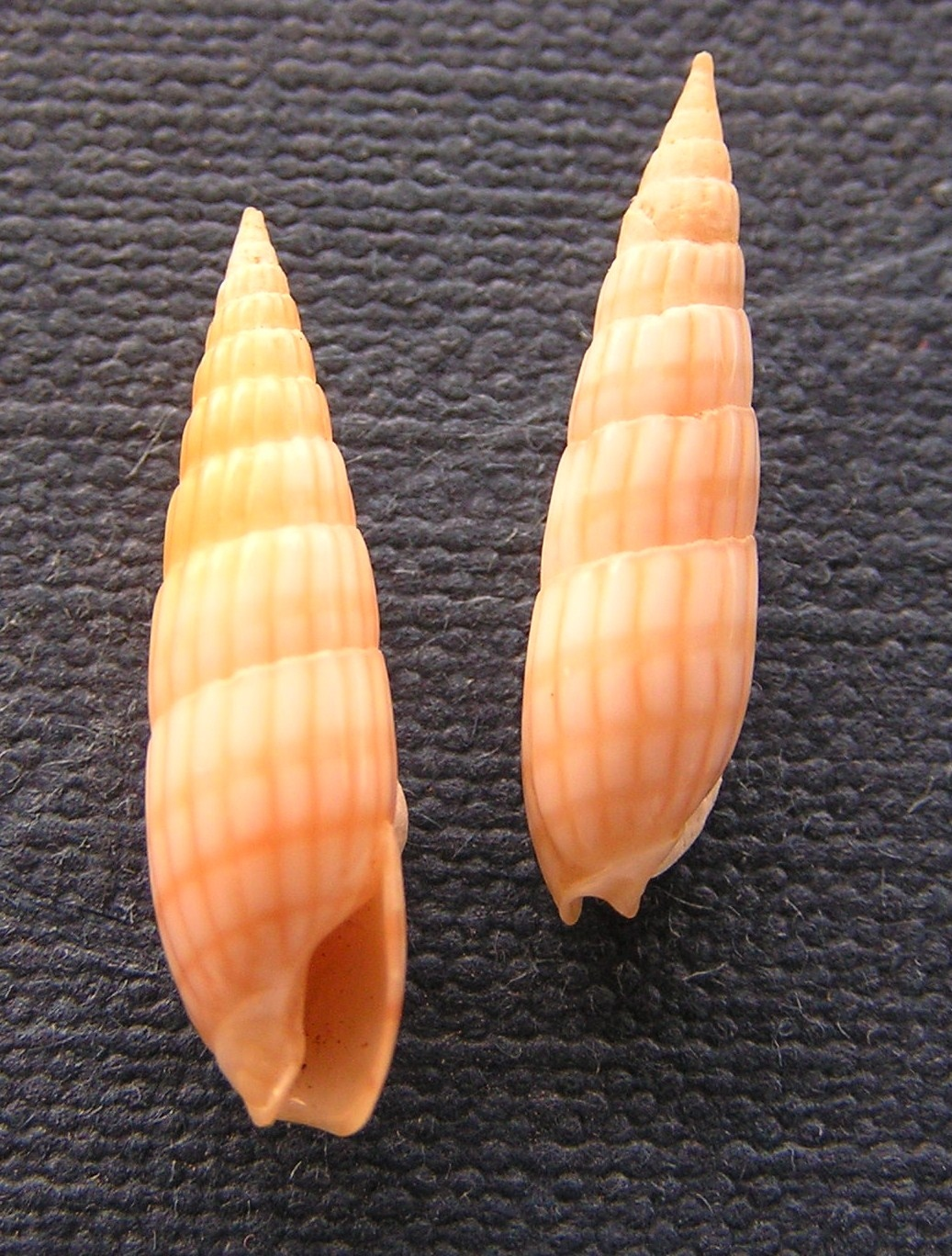
- Shells in differing orientations of Hastula augur sea snails
  Hastula
  - †Hastula ampulla – type locality for species
  - †Hastula houstonia
  - †Hastula longifera – type locality for species
  - †Hastula milamensis – type locality for species
  - †Hastula sabina
  - †Hastula venusta
- Haustator
  - †Haustator infans
  - †Haustator rina
- Hawaiia
  - †Hawaiia minuscula
- †Hawiia
  - †Hawiia minuscula
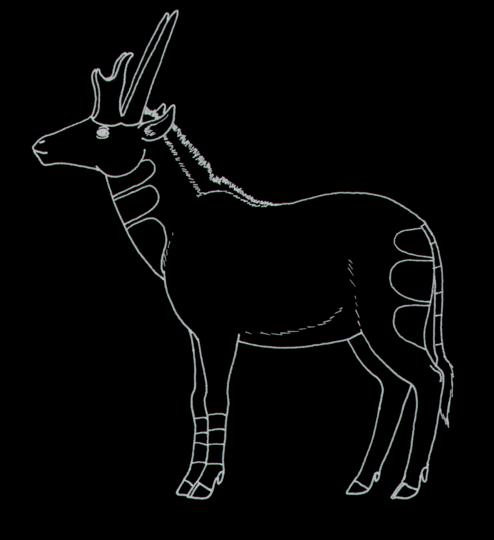
- Life restoration of the Pleistocene pronghorn Hayoceros
  †Hayoceros
  - †Hayoceros falkenbachi
- Helicina
  - †Helicina orbiculata
- Helicodiscus
  - †Helicodiscus paralellus
  - †Helicodiscus parallelus
  - †Helicodiscus singleyanus
- †Heliconoides
  - †Heliconoides auriformis – type locality for species
- Helisoma
  - †Helisoma anceps
  - †Helisoma trivolvis
- Heloderma
  - †Heloderma texana – type locality for species
- †Helohyus
  - †Helohyus lentus – or unidentified comparable form
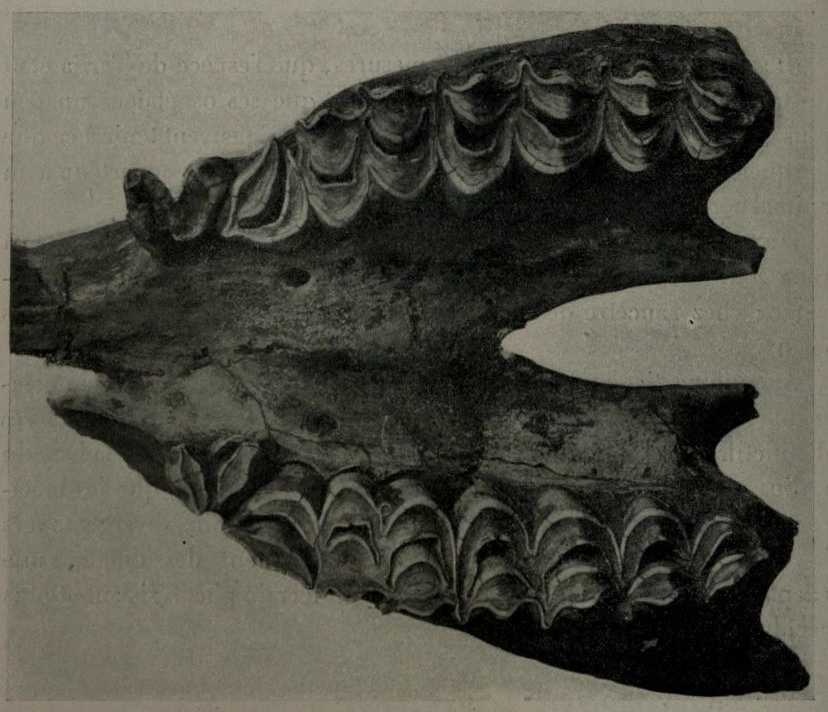
- Fossilized lower jaw of the Miocene-Pleistocene llama relative Hemiauchenia
  †Hemiauchenia
  - †Hemiauchenia macrocephala
- †Hemipsalodon
  - †Hemipsalodon viejaensis – type locality for species
- †Hendryomeryx
  - †Hendryomeryx defordi
  - †Hendryomeryx wilsoni
- †Heptacodon
  - †Heptacodon yeguaensis – type locality for species
- †Hercoglossa
  - †Hercoglossa – type locality for species A informal
  - †Hercoglossa gardnerae
  - †Hercoglossa splendens
  - †Hercoglossa ulrichi
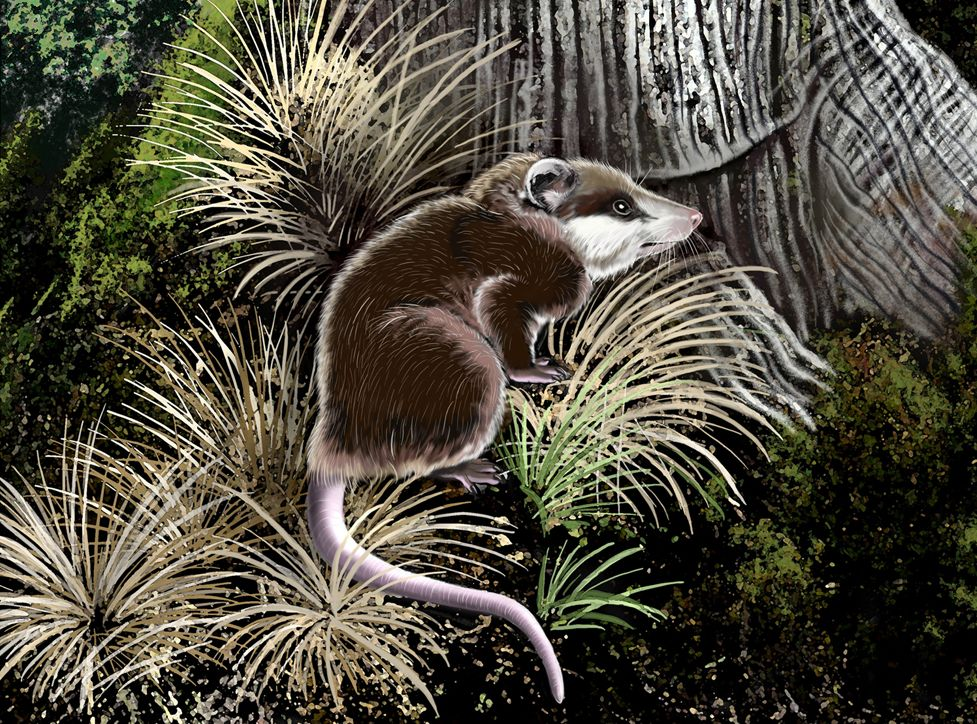
- Life restoration of the Eocene-Miocene mammal Herpetotherium
  †Herpetotherium
- †Hesperhys – tentative report
- †Hesperiturris
  - †Hesperiturris monilis – type locality for species
  - †Hesperiturris nodocarinatus – type locality for species
- †Hesperoscalops
  - †Hesperoscalops blancoensis
  - †Hesperoscalops rexroadi
  - †Hesperoscalops ruficervus
- †Hesperotestudo
  - †Hesperotestudo crassiscutata – type locality for species
  - †Hesperotestudo johnstoni – type locality for species
  - †Hesperotestudo turgida – type locality for species
  - †Hesperotestudo wilsoni
- †Hessolestes
- †Heteraletes
  - †Heteraletes leotanus – or unidentified comparable form
- Heterodon
  - †Heterodon nasicus – or unidentified comparable form
  - †Heterodon platyrhinos – or unidentified comparable form
- †Heteromeryx
  - †Heteromeryx dispar
- Hexaplex
  - †Hexaplex colei
  - †Hexaplex eoa – type locality for species
  - †Hexaplex silvaticus
  - †Hexaplex texanus – type locality for species
  - †Hexaplex vanuxemi
- †Hexobelomeryx – tentative report
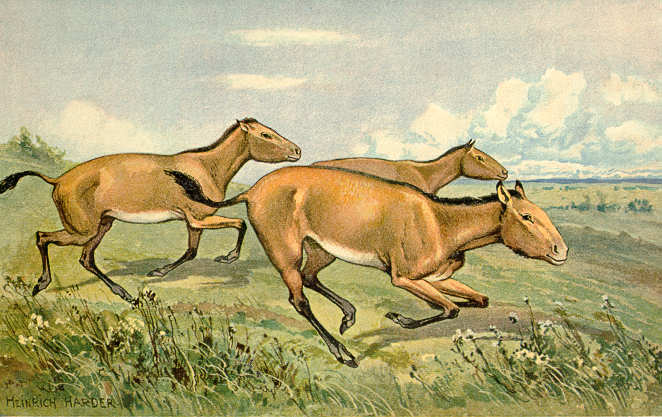
- Life restoration of a herd of the Miocene-Pleistocene horse Hipparion. Heinrich Harder (1920).
  †Hipparion
  - †Hipparion brevidontus
  - †Hipparion shirleyae
  - †Hipparion tehonense
- †Hippidion
- Hippodamia
  - †Hippodamia convergens – tentative report
- Hipponix
  - †Hipponix pygmaeus
- †Hippotherium
- Holbrookia
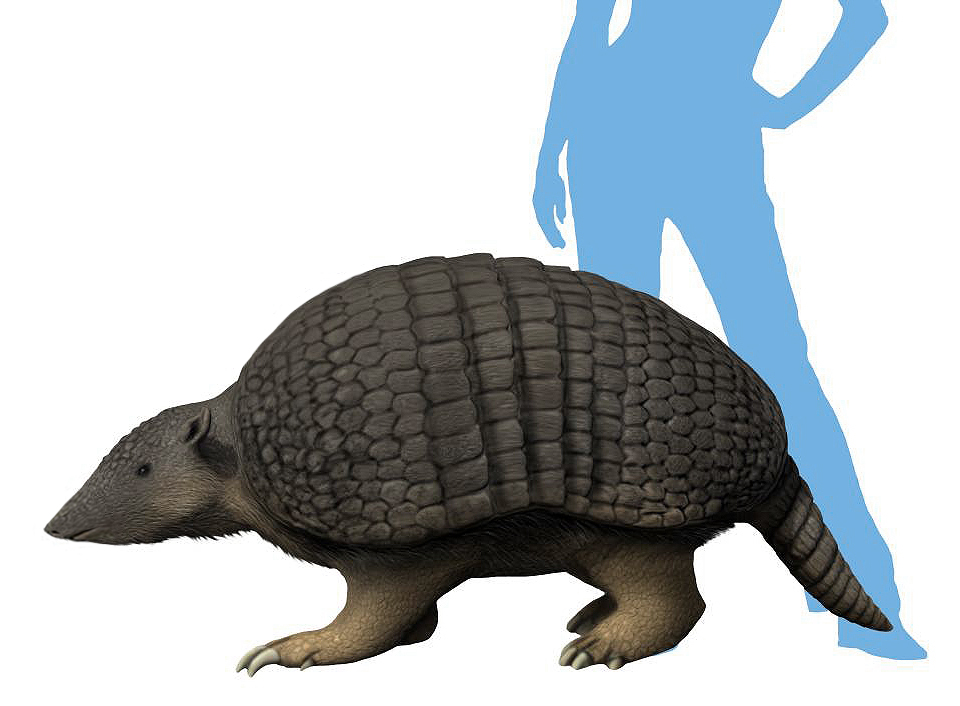
- Life restoration of the Pleistocene armadillo relative Holmesina with a human to scale
  †Holmesina
  - †Holmesina septentrionalis
- †Homotherium
  - †Homotherium johnstoni
  - †Homotherium serum
- †Hyaenodon
  - †Hyaenodon crucians
  - †Hyaenodon horridus – or unidentified comparable form
  - †Hyaenodon montanus
  - †Hyaenodon raineyi
  - †Hyaenodon vetus – or unidentified comparable form
- Hyla
  - †Hyla holmani – type locality for species
  - †Hyla miocenica – type locality for species
- †Hylomeryx
- †Hyopsodus
  - †Hyopsodus paulus
  - †Hyopsodus uintensis – or unidentified comparable form
  - †Hyopsodus wortmani – or unidentified comparable form
- Hyotissa
  - †Hyotissa offemanae – type locality for species
  - †Hyotissa offmanna
- †Hypertragulus
  - †Hypertragulus heikeni – or unidentified comparable form
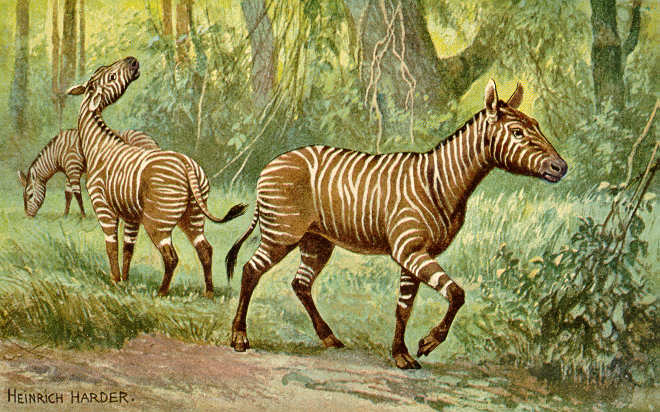
- Life restoration of the Miocene horse Hypohippus. Heinrich Harder (1920).
  †Hypohippus
  - †Hypohippus affinis – type locality for species
- †Hypolagus
  - †Hypolagus edensis
  - †Hypolagus fontinalis
  - †Hypolagus furlongi
  - †Hypolagus gidleyi
  - †Hypolagus regalis
  - †Hypolagus ringoldensis
  - †Hypolagus vetus
- †Hyrachyus
  - †Hyrachyus modestus – or unidentified comparable form
- †Hyracodon
  - †Hyracodon medius
  - †Hyracodon petersoni
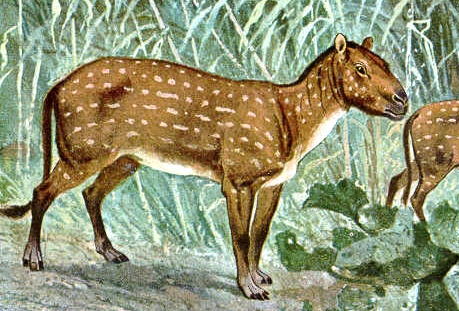
- Life restoration of the Eocene horse Eohippus. Heinrich Harder (1920).
  †Hyracotherium
  - †Hyracotherium vasacciense

== I ==
- †Icacorea
  - †Icacorea prepaniculata
- Ictalurus
  - †Ictalurus punctatus
- †Ictiobus
- †Ignacius
  - †Ignacius frugivorus
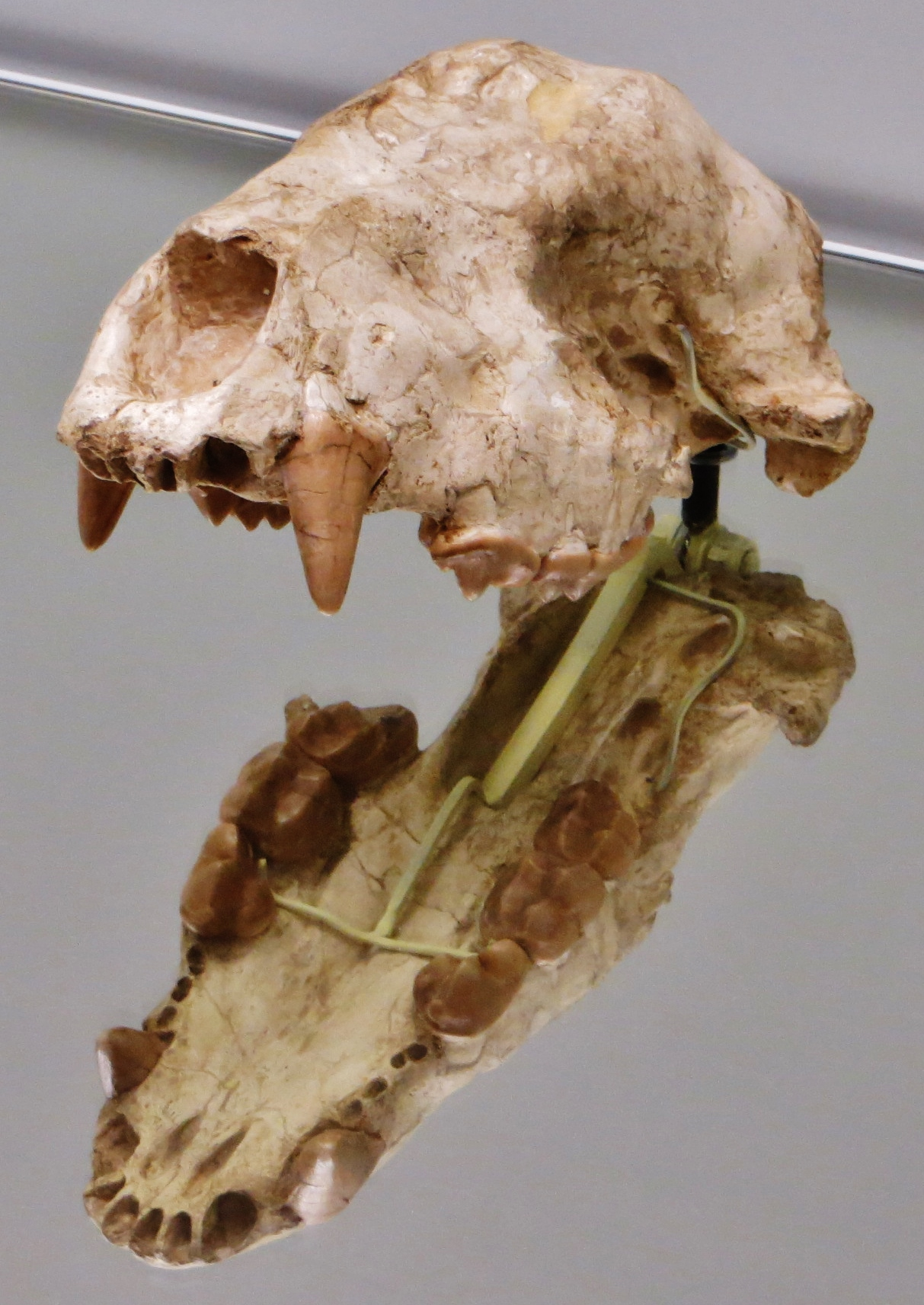
- Fossilized skull of the Miocene bear Indarctos
  †Indarctos
- †Infracoronia
  - †Infracoronia ludoviciana
- †Inga
  - †Inga laurinafolia
- †Ischnognathus
  - †Ischnognathus savagei – type locality for species
- †Ischyrocyon
  - †Ischyrocyon gidleyi – type locality for species
- †Ischyromys
  - †Ischyromys blacki – type locality for species
- Isognomon

== J ==
- †Jefitchia – type locality for genus
  - †Jefitchia copelandi – type locality for species
- †Jepsenella
- †Jimomys
  - †Jimomys labaughi
- Juglans
  - †Juglans bastropensis
- Jupiteria
  - †Jupiteria smirna

== K ==
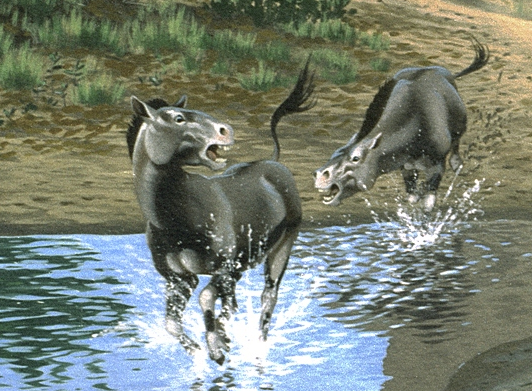
- Restoration of the Oligocene-Miocene horse Kalobatippus
  †Kalobatippus
  - †Kalobatippus australis
- †Kansasimys
  - †Kansasimys dubius
- †Kapalmerella
  - †Kapalmerella arenicola
  - †Kapalmerella dumblei
  - †Kapalmerella mortoni
  - †Kapalmerella pleboides
- Katherinella
  - †Katherinella smithvillensis
  - †Katherinella texitrina
  - †Katherinella trinitatis
- Kelliella
  - †Kelliella aldrichi
  - †Kelliella evansi
- Kellyella
  - †Kellyella texana – type locality for species
- Kinosternon
  - †Kinosternon flavescens
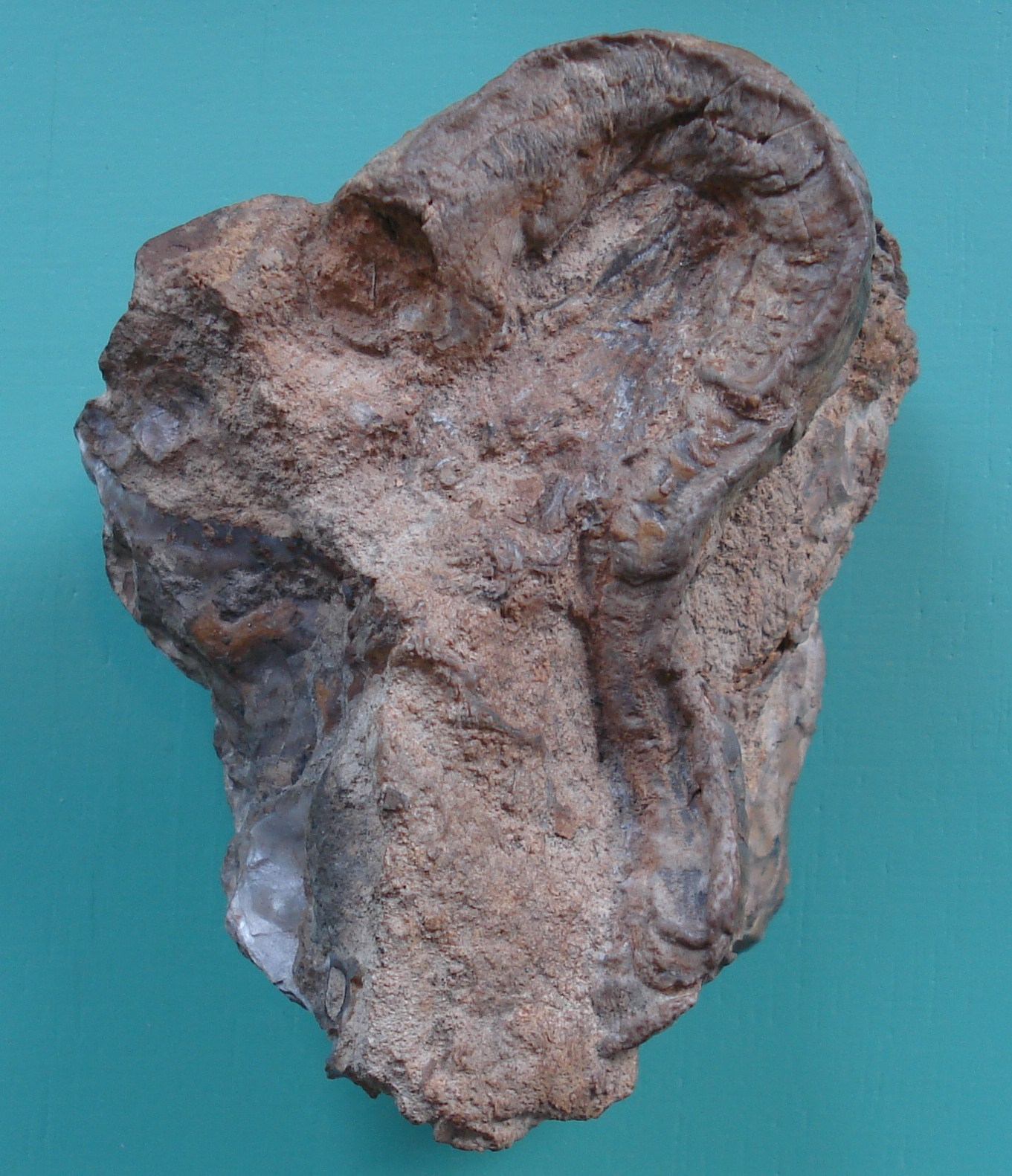
- Fossilized "worm" tube, possibly of the Oligocene-modern shipworm marine bivalve genus Kuphus
  Kuphus

== L ==
- †Lacinia
  - †Lacinia alveata
- †Lacunaria
  - †Lacunaria lithae
- †Laevibuccinum
  - †Laevibuccinum constrictum
  - †Laevibuccinum lineatum
- †Lambdoceras
  - †Lambdoceras trinitiensis
- †Lambertocyon
  - †Lambertocyon eximius
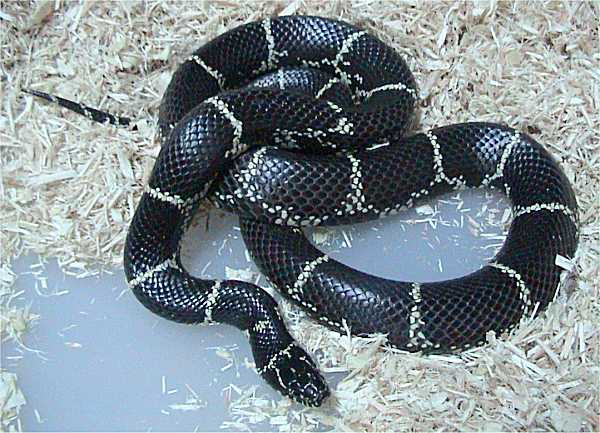
- A living Lampropeltis getula, or eastern kingsnake
  Lampropeltis
  - †Lampropeltis getulus
  - †Lampropeltis triangulum
- †Langiopollis
  - †Langiopollis eocaenica
- †Lapparia
  - †Lapparia crassa
  - †Lapparia dumosa
  - †Lapparia elongata
  - †Lapparia mooreana
  - †Lapparia nuda
- †Laredochoerus – type locality for genus
  - †Laredochoerus edwardsi – type locality for species
- †Laredomys
  - †Laredomys riograndensis – type locality for species
- Lasionycteris
  - †Lasionycteris noctivagans
- Lasiurus
  - †Lasiurus borealis
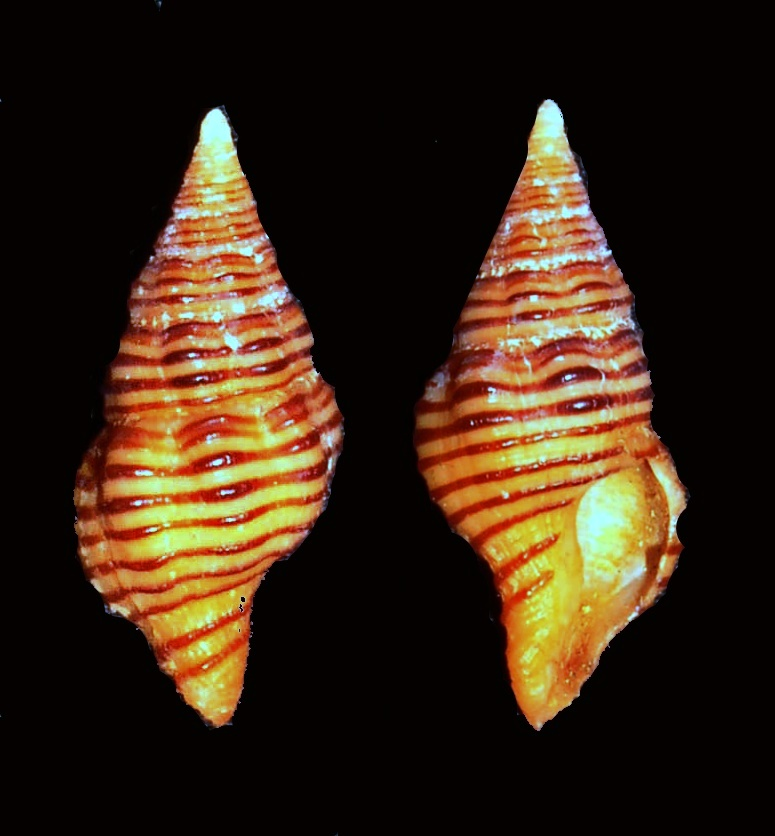
- Two views of a shell of a Latirus sea snail
  Latirus
  - †Latirus humilior
  - †Latirus moorei
  - †Latirus ostrarupis
  - †Latirus sexcostatus
  - †Latirus stephensoni
  - †Latirus traceyi – type locality for species
- †Latrius
  - †Latrius traceyi – type locality for species
- †Ledina
  - †Ledina smirna
  - †Ledina turgeo – type locality for species
- †Leea
- Lepisosteus
  - †Lepisosteus spatula – or unidentified comparable form
- Lepomis
  - †Lepomis cyanellus – or unidentified comparable form
- †Leptarctus
  - †Leptarctus supremus – type locality for species
- †Leptictis
  - †Leptictis douglassi – type locality for species
  - †Leptictis wilsoni – type locality for species
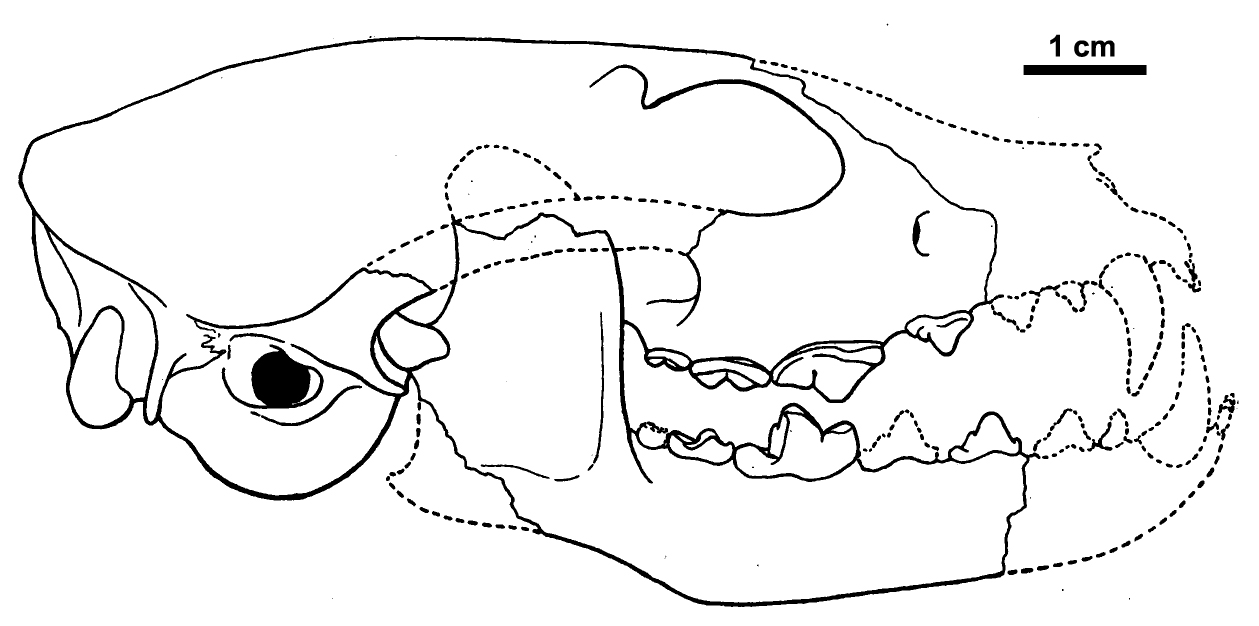
- Illustration of a fossilized skull of the Oligocene-Miocene dog Leptocyon
  †Leptocyon
  - †Leptocyon vafer
- †Leptoreodon
  - †Leptoreodon edwardsi
  - †Leptoreodon leptolophus
  - †Leptoreodon major
  - †Leptoreodon marshi
  - †Leptoreodon pusillus
- †Leptosurcula
  - †Leptosurcula beadata
  - †Leptosurcula carinata – type locality for species
- †Leptotomus
- Lepus
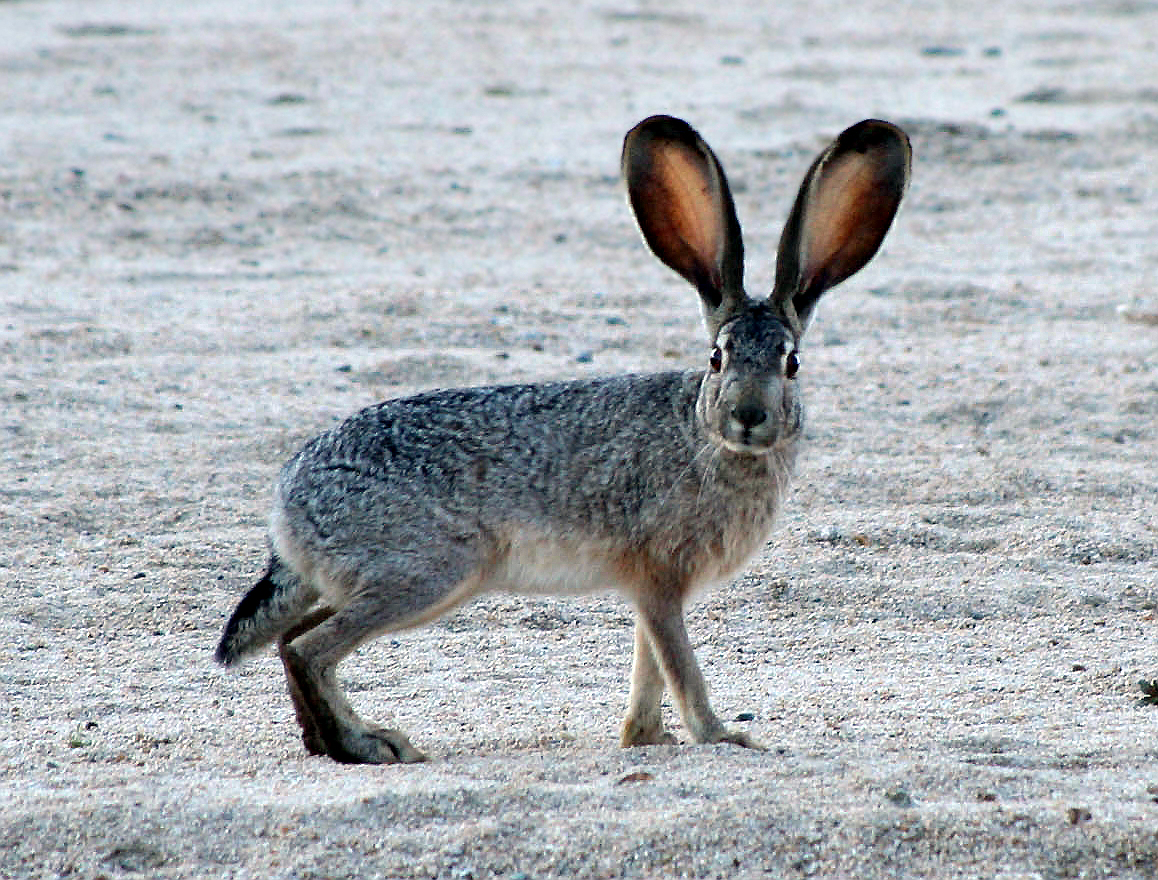
  - Lepus californicus, or black-tailed jackrabbit
    †Lepus californicus
- †Levifusus
  - †Levifusus dalei – tentative report
  - †Levifusus hubbardi
  - †Levifusus identus
  - †Levifusus irrasus
  - †Levifusus lithae
  - †Levifusus mortoniopsis
  - †Levifusus pagodiformis
  - †Levifusus serrae – type locality for species
  - †Levifusus supraplanus
  - †Levifusus trabeatus
- Limacina
  - †Limacina stenzeli – type locality for species
  - †Limacina taylori
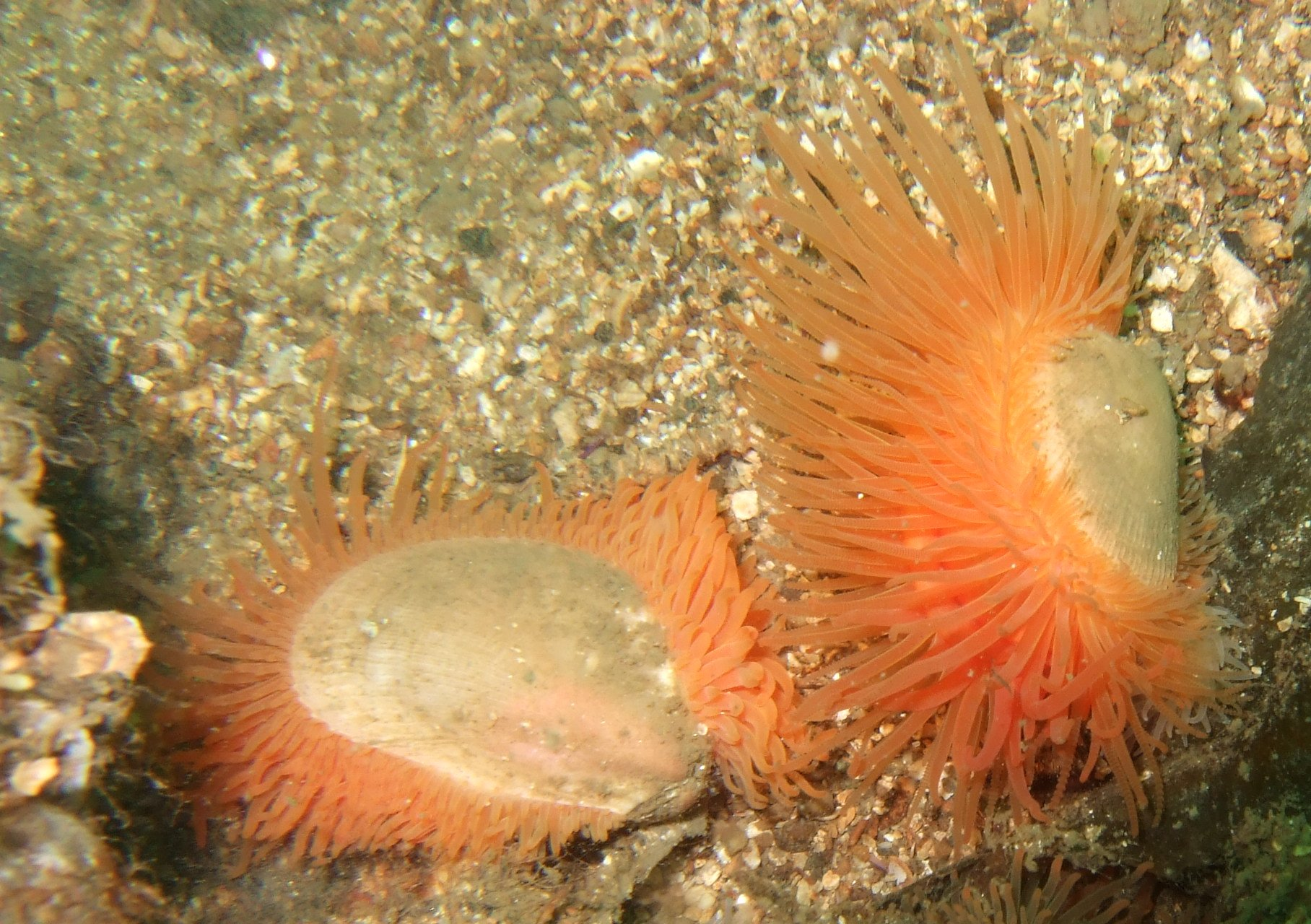
- Living Limaria, or file shells
  Limaria
  - †Limaria petropolitana
  - †Limaria smithvillensis
- †Limnenetes
  - †Limnenetes platyceps – or unidentified comparable form
- Limopsis
  - †Limopsis quihi
  - †Limopsis radiata
- †Linthia
  - †Linthia alabamensis
- †Lirodiscus
  - †Lirodiscus jacksonensis
  - †Lirodiscus smithvillensis
- †Lirofusus
  - †Lirofusus subtenuis
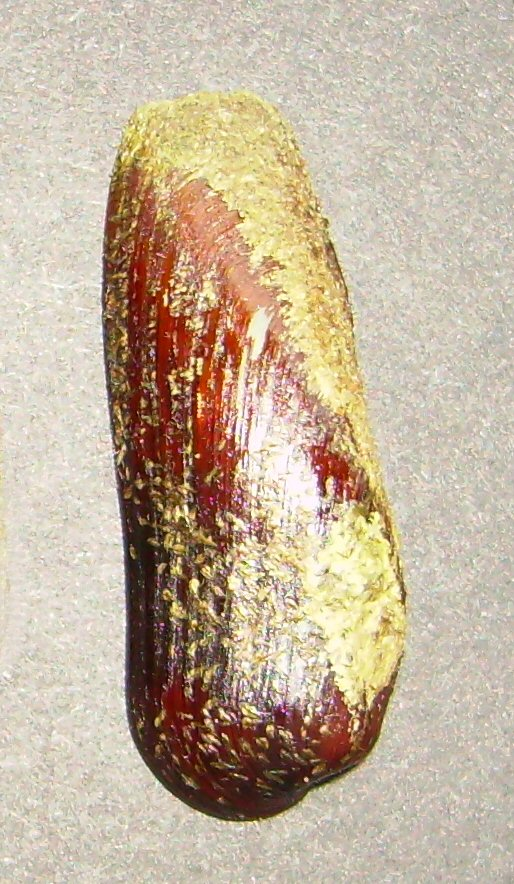
- Shell of a Lithophaga, or date mussel
  Lithophaga
- †Lithophysema
  - †Lithophysema grande
- Litiopa
  - †Litiopa texana – type locality for species
- †Litorhadia
  - †Litorhadia aldrichiana
  - †Litorhadia bastropensis
  - †Litorhadia compsa
  - †Litorhadia evanescentior
  - †Litorhadia milamensis – type locality for species
  - †Litorhadia petropolitana
  - †Litorhadia undulata – type locality for species
  - †Litorhadia valdefragilis – type locality for species
- †Litoyoderimys
  - †Litoyoderimys lustrorum
- Littorina
  - †Littorina eofasciata – type locality for species
- †Longirostromeryx
  - †Longirostromeryx clarendonensis – type locality for species
  - †Longirostromeryx wellsi
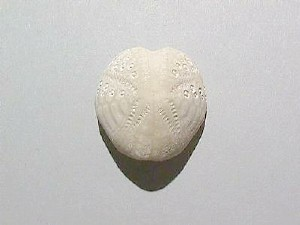
- Shell of a Lovenia sea urchin
  Lovenia
  - †Lovenia alabamensis
- Loxoconcha
  - †Loxoconcha delicata
- Lucina
  - †Lucina subcurta
- Lucinisca
- Lunatia – report made of unidentified related form or using admittedly obsolete nomenclature
  - †Lunatia moorei
- Lunularia – tentative report
- Lunulites
  - †Lunulites bouei
  - †Lunulites ligulata
  - †Lunulites truncata
- †Lygodiumsporites
  - †Lygodiumsporites adriennis
- Lymnaea
  - †Lymnaea caperata
  - †Lymnaea dalli
  - †Lymnaea modicella
  - †Lymnaea obrussa
- Lynx
  - †Lynx proterolyncis
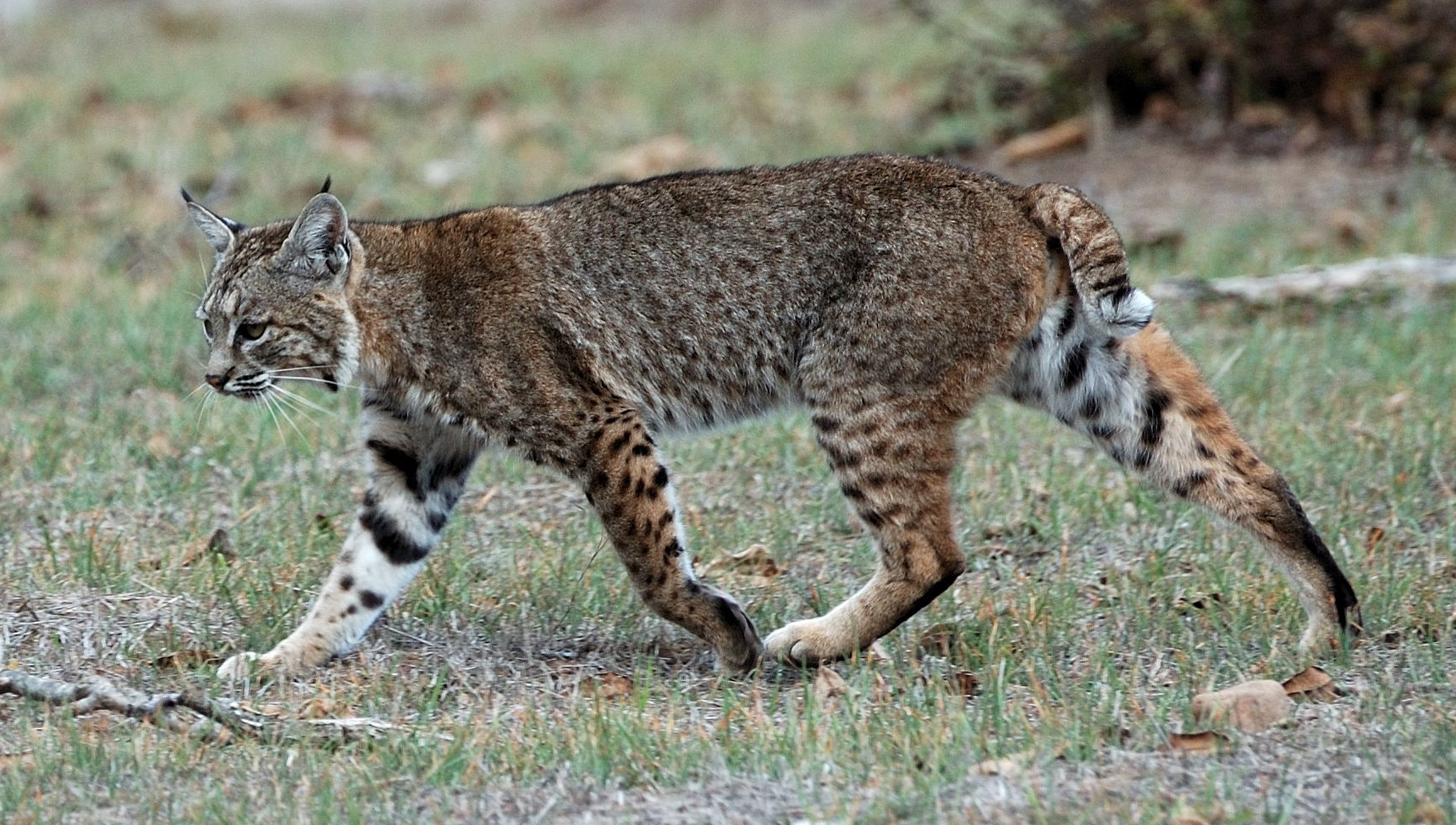
  - A living Lynx rufus, or bobcat
    †Lynx rufus
- Lyria
- †Lyrosurcula
  - †Lyrosurcula gibbera
  - †Lyrosurcula vaughani
- Lytta

== M ==
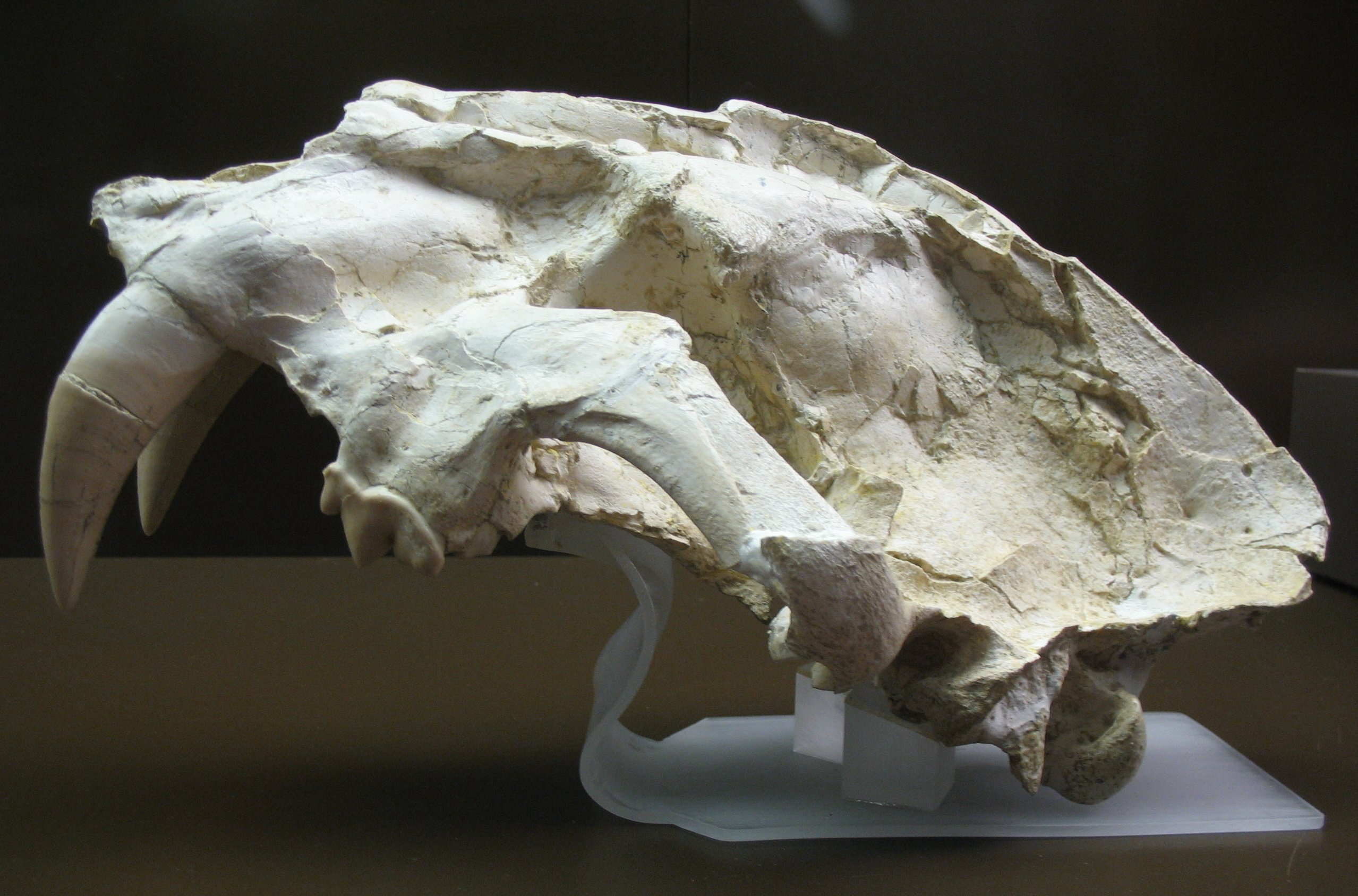
- Fossilized cranium of the Miocene-Pleistocene saber-toothed cat Machairodus
  †Machairodus
  - †Machairodus catocopis
- Macrocallista
  - †Macrocallista triangulata – type locality for species
- †Macrotarsius
  - †Macrotarsius jepseni – or unidentified comparable form
- Mactra
- Madracis
  - †Madracis gregorioi
  - †Madracis herricki – type locality for species
  - †Madracis johnsoni – type locality for species
- Madrepora
  - †Madrepora natchitochensis
- Magnolia
  - †Magnolia leei
- †Mahgarita
  - †Mahgarita stevensi – type locality for species
- †Malaquiferus – tentative report
- †Mammut
  - †Mammut americanum
- †Mammuthus
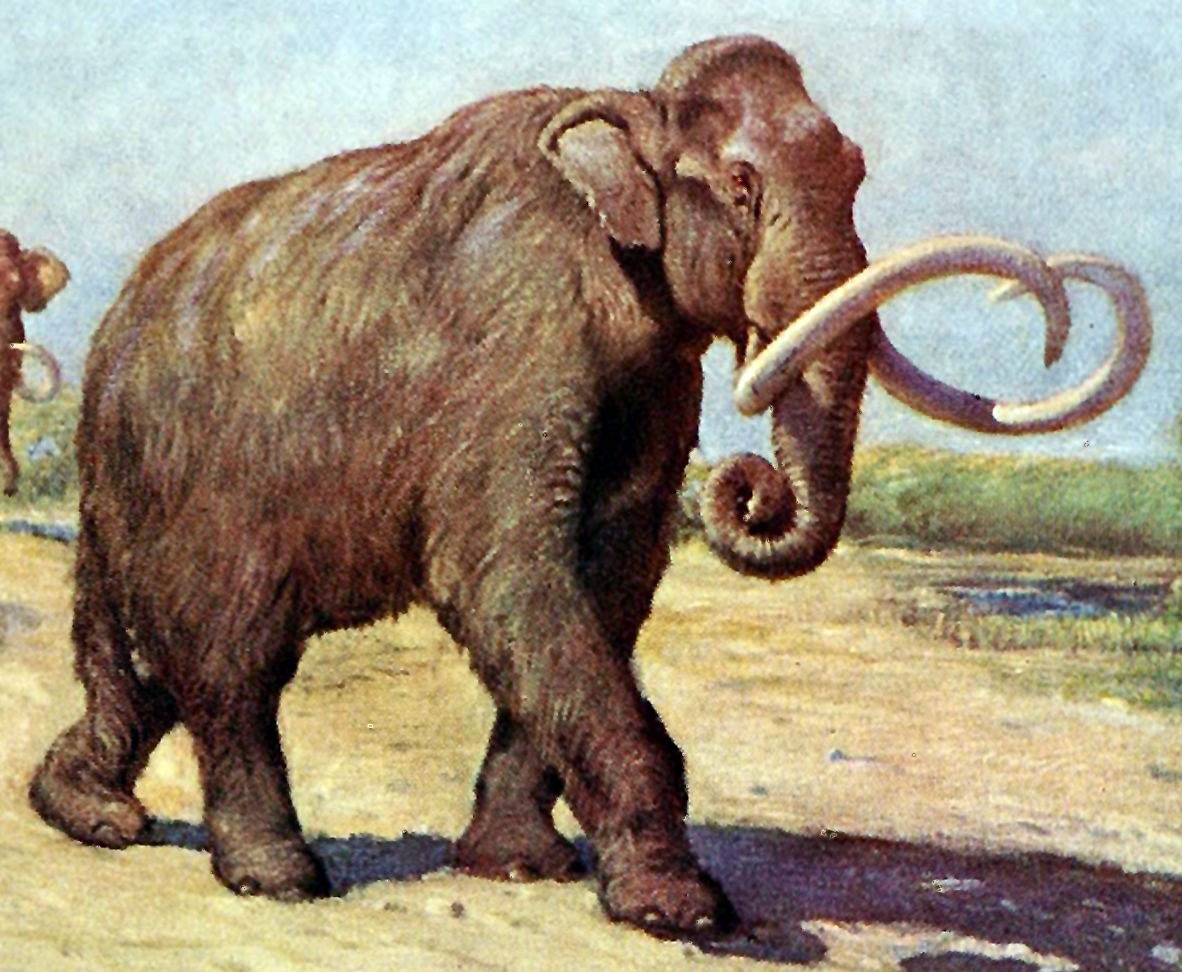
  - Life restoration of a herd of Mammuthus columbi, or Columbian mammoths. The extent of the fur depicted is hypothetical. Charles R. Knight (1909).
    †Mammuthus columbi
  - †Mammuthus hayi
- Marginella
  - †Marginella carnea
  - †Marginella constrictoides
- Marmota
  - †Marmota flaviventris
- †Marshochoerus
  - †Marshochoerus socialis
- Martes
- Martesia
  - †Martesia laredoensis
  - †Martesia texana
- †Martinogale
  - †Martinogale chisoensis
- †Mathilda
  - †Mathilda claibornensis
  - †Mathilda cribraea – type locality for species
  - †Mathilda iugum – type locality for species
  - †Mathilda retisculpta
- †Mauricia
  - †Mauricia houstonia
  - †Mauricia leonia
- †Mazzalina
  - †Mazzalina conica – type locality for species
  - †Mazzalina plena
- †Megalictis – tentative report
- †Megalonyx
  - †Megalonyx jeffersonii – or unidentified comparable form
  - †Megalonyx leptostomus
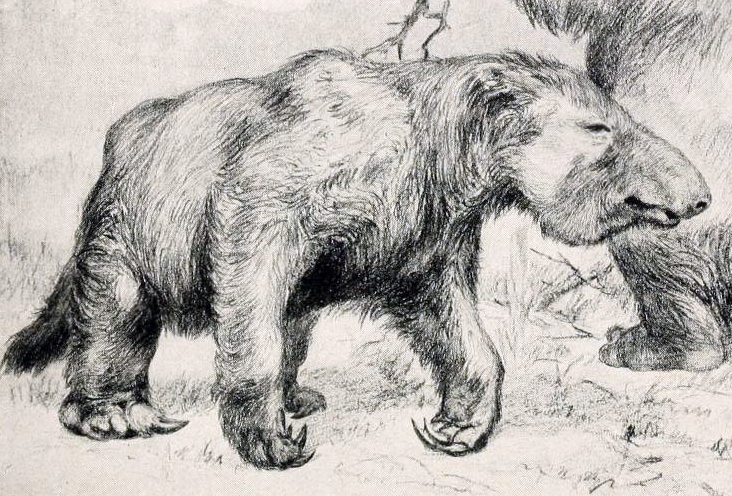
- Restoration of the Pliocene-Holocene ground sloth Megatherium. Robert Bruce Horsfall (1913).
  †Megatherium
  - †Megatherium mirabite
- †Megatylopus
  - †Megatylopus matthewi – type locality for species
  - †Megatylopus primaevus
- Melanella
  - †Melanella extremis – or unidentified related form
  - †Melanella minutissima – type locality for species
  - †Melanella notata – or unidentified comparable form
  - †Melanella wheeleri
- †Meliakrouniomys
  - †Meliakrouniomys wilsoni – type locality for species
- Meliosma
  - †Meliosma berryi – type locality for species
- †Menetus
  - †Menetus dilataus
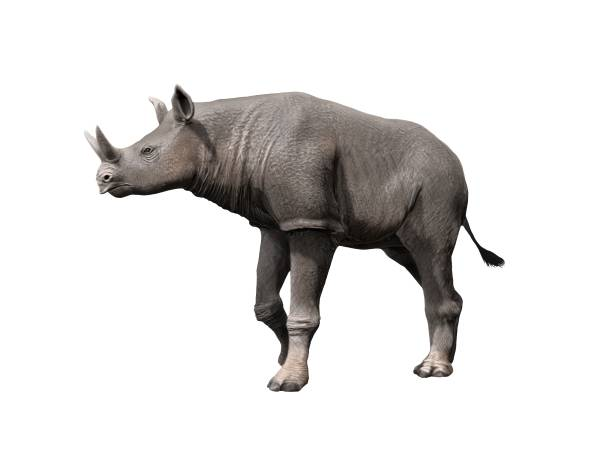
- Life restoration of the Miocene rhinoceros Menoceras
  †Menoceras
  - †Menoceras barbouri
- †Menops
  - †Menops bakeri
- Mephitis
  - †Mephitis mephitis
- Meretrix
  - †Meretrix nuttelliopsis
- †Merychippus
  - †Merychippus gunteri
  - †Merychippus insignis – or unidentified comparable form
  - †Merychippus sejunctus
  - †Merychippus shirleyae
- †Merychyus
  - †Merychyus calaminthus – or unidentified comparable form
  - †Merychyus novomexicanus
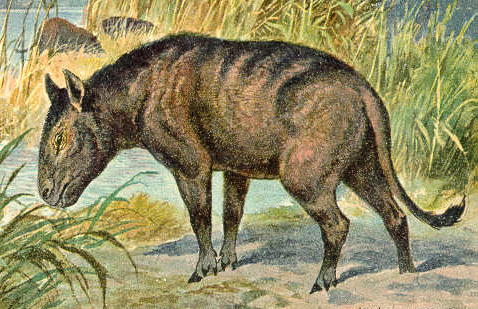
- Restoration of the Eocene-Oligocene oreodont mammal Merycoidodon. Heinrich Harder (1920).
  †Merycoidodon
  - †Merycoidodon culbertsoni
  - †Merycoidodon presidioensis
- Mesalia
  - †Mesalia alabamiensis
  - †Mesalia allentonensis
  - †Mesalia biplicata
  - †Mesalia claibornensis
  - †Mesalia mavericki
- †Mescalerolemur – type locality for genus
  - †Mescalerolemur horneri – type locality for species
- Mesodesma
  - †Mesodesma singleyi
- †Mesodma
  - †Mesodma pygmaea – or unidentified comparable form
  - †Mesodma thompsoni
- †Mesohippus
  - †Mesohippus texanus
- †Mesomphix
- †Metalopex
  - †Metalopex bakeri – type locality for species
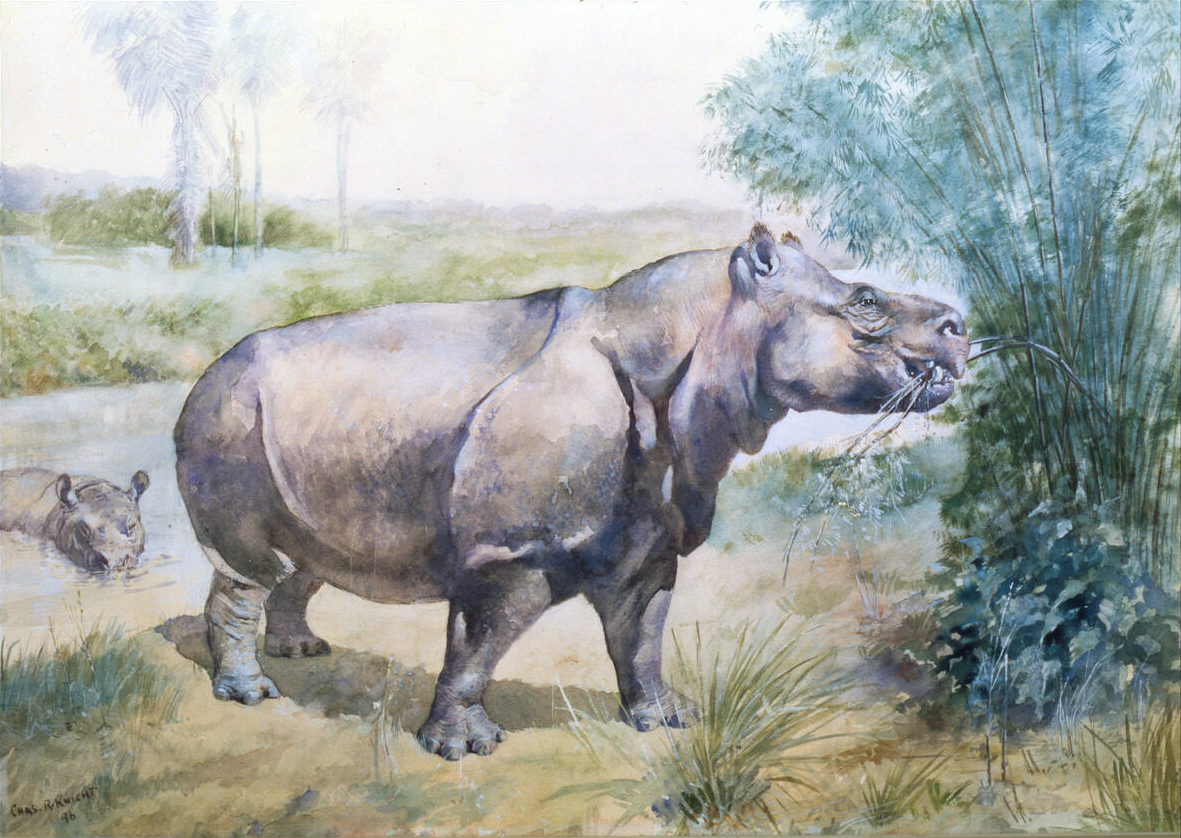
- Restoration of the Eocene-Miocene swamp rhinoceros Metamynodon. Charles R. Knight (1896).
  †Metamynodon
  - †Metamynodon chadronensis
  - †Metamynodon mckinneyi – type locality for species
- Metula
  - †Metula brazosensis
  - †Metula elongatoides – type locality for species
  - †Metula gracilis
  - †Metula reticulata – type locality for species
- †Michela
  - †Michela trabeatoides – type locality for species
- †Michenia
  - †Michenia exilis – type locality for species
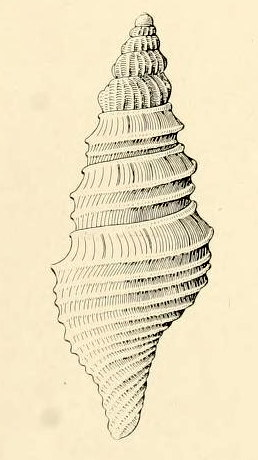
- Shell in multiple views of a Microdrillia sea snail
  Microdrillia
  - †Microdrillia aldrichella
  - †Microdrillia aldrichiella
  - †Microdrillia elongatula
  - †Microdrillia harrisi
  - †Microdrillia infans
  - †Microdrillia laeviplicata
  - †Microdrillia parthenoides
  - †Microdrillia robustula – or unidentified related form
  - †Microdrillia rostratula
  - †Microdrillia solidula
- †Microeutypomys
  - †Microeutypomys karenae – type locality for species
- †Microparamys
  - †Microparamys minutus
  - †Microparamys perfossus
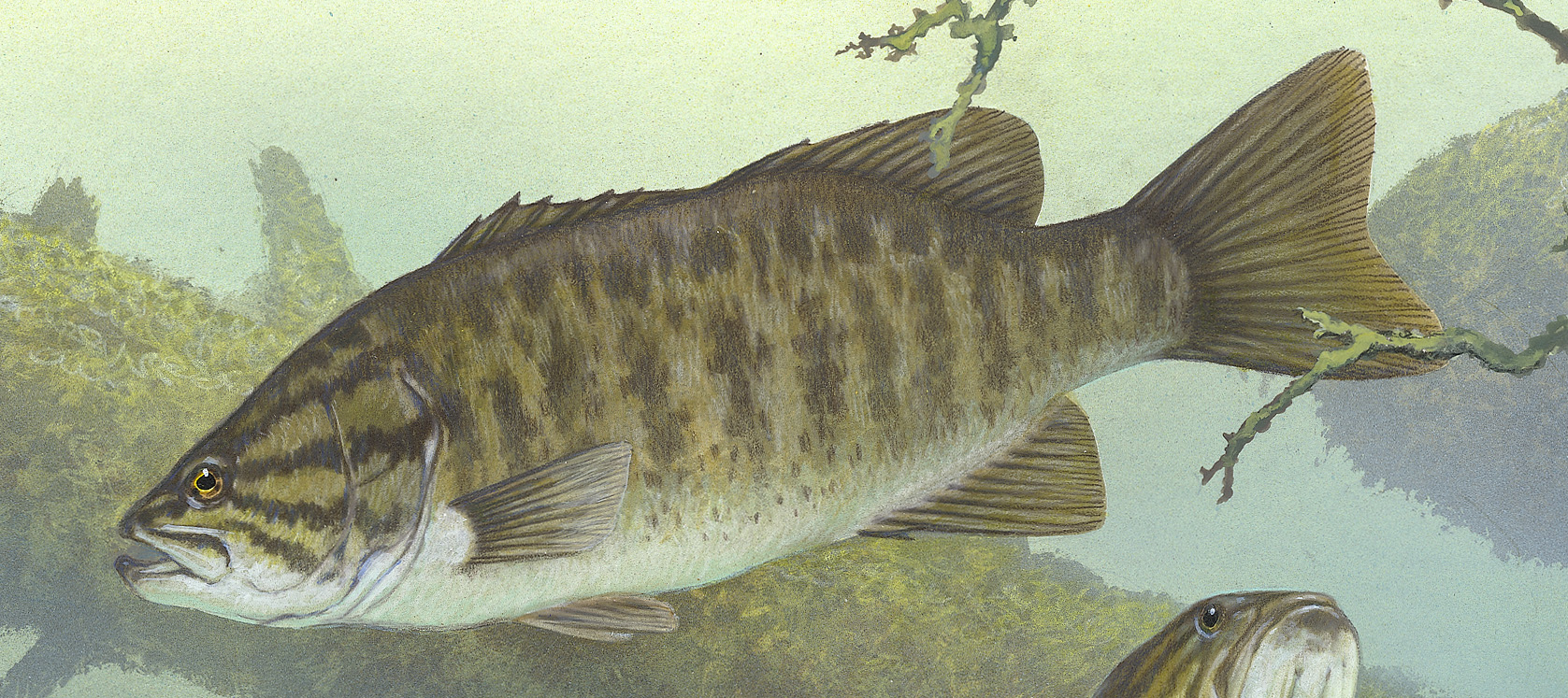
- Illustration of a living Micropterus, or black bass
  Micropterus
- †Microsurcula
  - †Microsurcula iuventae – type locality for species
- †Microsyops
  - †Microsyops annectens
- †Microtomarctus
  - †Microtomarctus conferta
- Microtus
  - †Microtus australis
  - †Microtus llanensis
  - †Microtus meadensis
  - †Microtus mexicanus
  - †Microtus paroperarius
  - †Microtus pennsylvanicus
  - †Microtus pinetorum
- Micrurus
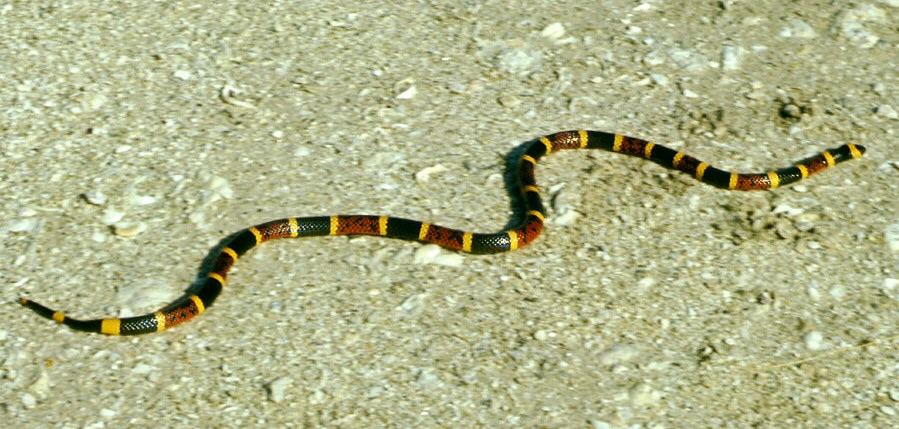
  - A living Micrurus fulvius, or eastern coral snake
    †Micrurus fulvius
- Mictomys
  - †Mictomys meltoni
- Miltha
  - †Miltha albaripus
- †Mimetodon
  - †Mimetodon silberlingi
- †Minippus
  - †Minippus index
- †Mioclaenus
  - †Mioclaenus opisthacus
- †Miocoluber – type locality for genus
  - †Miocoluber dalquesti – type locality for species
- †Miocyon
  - †Miocyon scotti – or unidentified comparable form
  - †Miocyon vallisrubrae
- †Miohippus
- †Miolabis
- †Mionictis
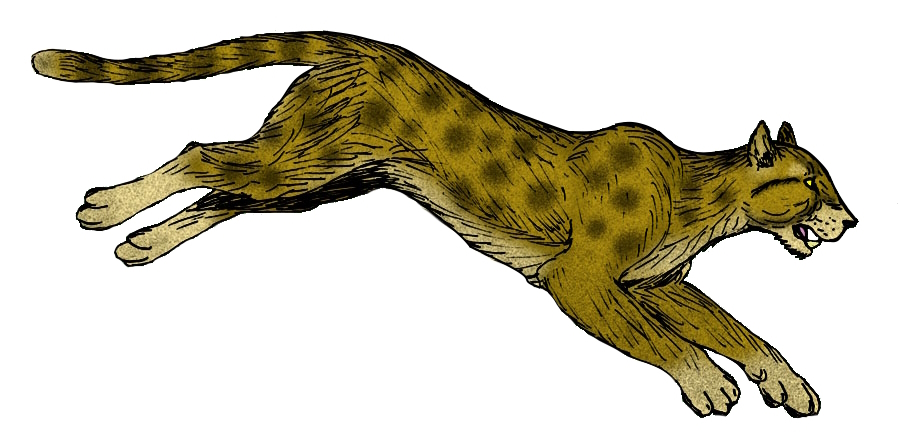
- Restoration of the Pliocene-Pleistocene Miracinonyx, or American cheetah
  †Miracinonyx
  - †Miracinonyx inexpectatus – or unidentified comparable form
  - †Miracinonyx studeri
- Mitrella
  - †Mitrella bastropensis
  - †Mitrella nuttalli – type locality for species
  - †Mitrella texana – type locality for species
- †Mixodectes
  - †Mixodectes malaris
- †Mixotoxodon
- Mnestia
  - †Mnestia confusa – type locality for species
  - †Mnestia dekayi
  - †Mnestia ovata – type locality for species
  - †Mnestia rotunda – type locality for species
- Modiolus – tentative report
- †Monoptygma
  - †Monoptygma crassiplicum
- Montastraea
  - †Montastraea intermedia
- †Moropus
  - †Moropus oregonensis – or unidentified comparable form
- †Morrillia
  - †Morrillia barbouri
- Murex
  - †Murex fusates
  - †Murex mansfieldi
- Mustela
  - †Mustela rexroadensis
- Myctophum
  - †Myctophum americanum – type locality for species
- Myliobatis
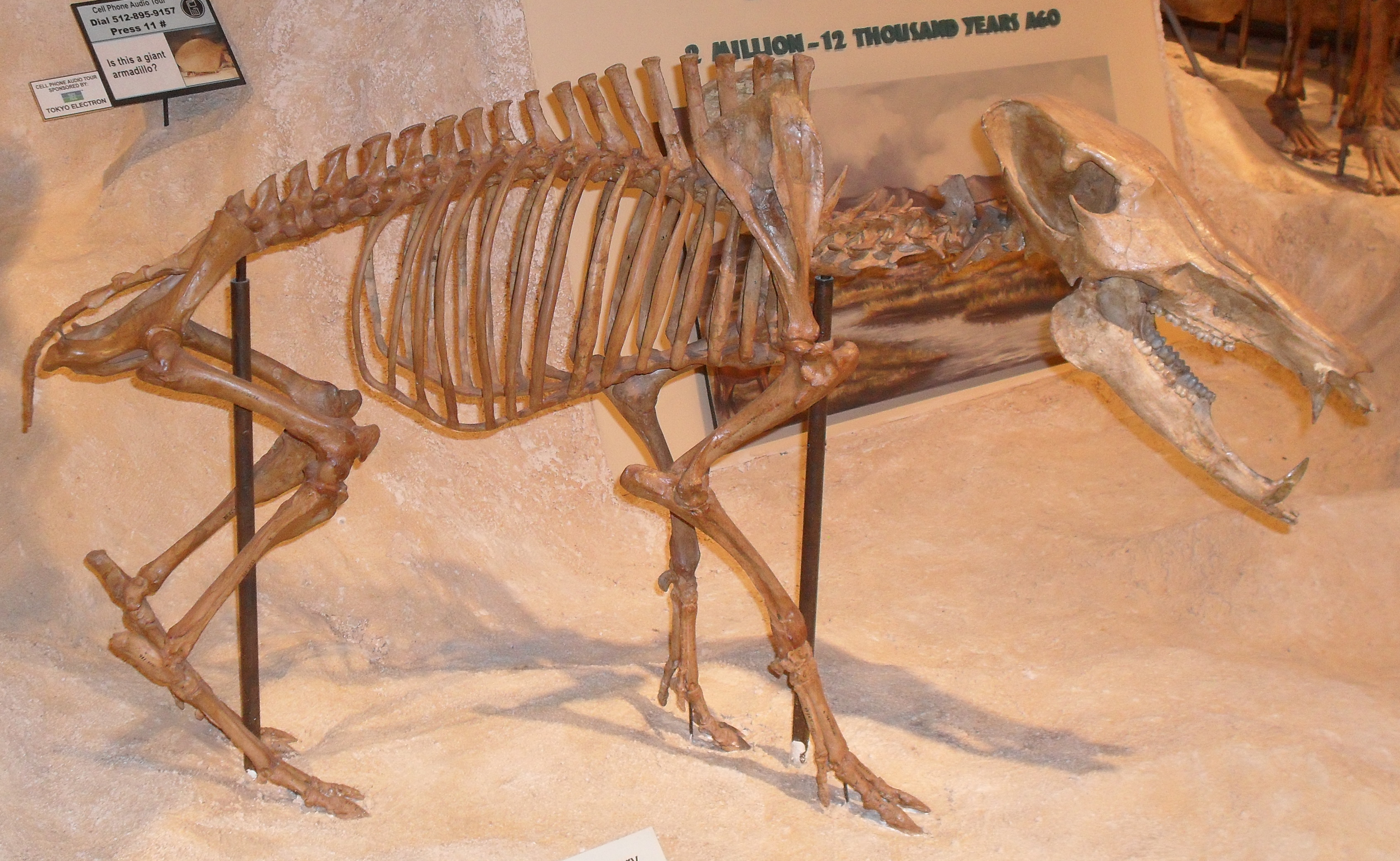
- Fossilized skeleton of the Pliocene-Holocene peccary Mylohyus
  †Mylohyus
  - †Mylohyus fossilis
- Myotis
  - †Myotis lucifugus
  - †Myotis velifer
- Myrtea
  - †Myrtea curta
  - †Myrtea mesakta
  - †Myrtea uhleri – or unidentified comparable form
- Mytilus
- †Mytonomys
  - †Mytonomys coelumensis
  - †Mytonomys robustus
- Myzinum – or unidentified comparable form

== N ==
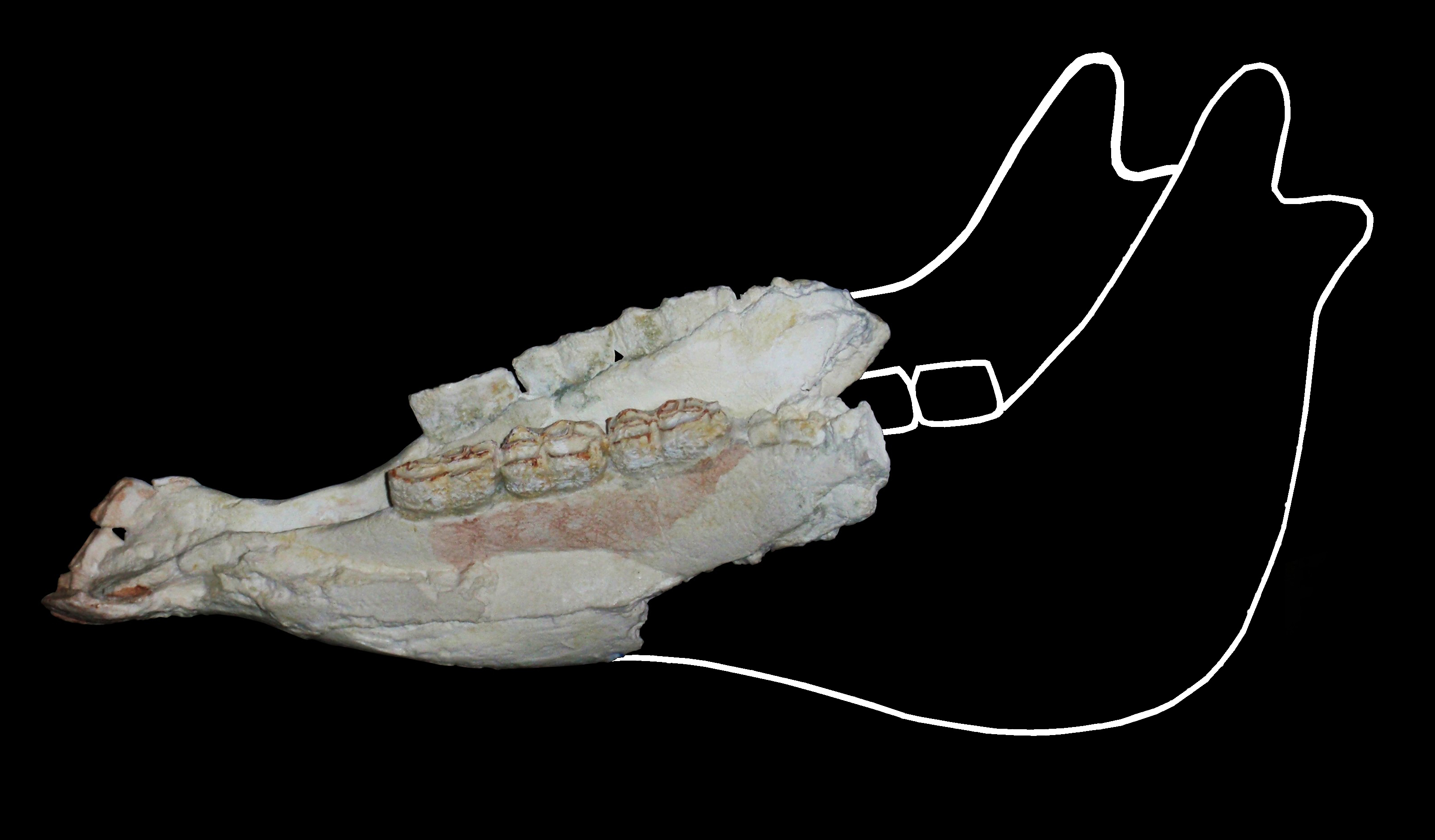
- Partial fossilized mandible of the Miocene-Pliocene horse Nannippus
  †Nannippus
  - †Nannippus aztecus
  - †Nannippus beckensis – type locality for species
  - †Nannippus lenticularis
  - †Nannippus peninsulatus
- †Nannodectes
  - †Nannodectes gidleyi – or unidentified related form
- †Nanotragulus
  - †Nanotragulus ordinatus
- Narona
  - †Narona greggi
- Nassarius
  - †Nassarius emoryi
  - †Nassarius exilis
  - †Nassarius nodosa – type locality for species
  - †Nassarius seguinensis – type locality for species
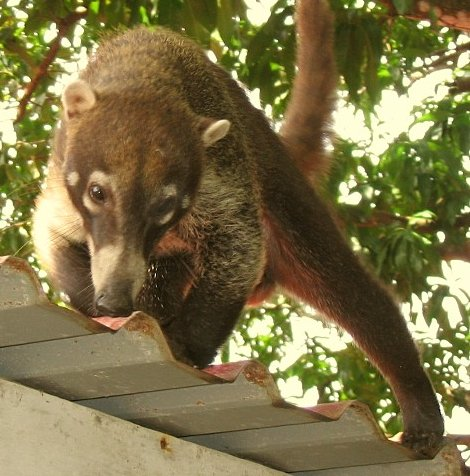
- A living Nasua, or coati
  Nasua
  - †Nasua pronarica – type locality for species
- Natica
  - †Natica aperta
  - †Natica brevisulcata – type locality for species
  - †Natica clarkeana
  - †Natica moffitti – type locality for species
  - †Natica moorei
  - †Natica permunda
  - †Natica perspecta
  - †Natica reversa
  - †Natica saffordia
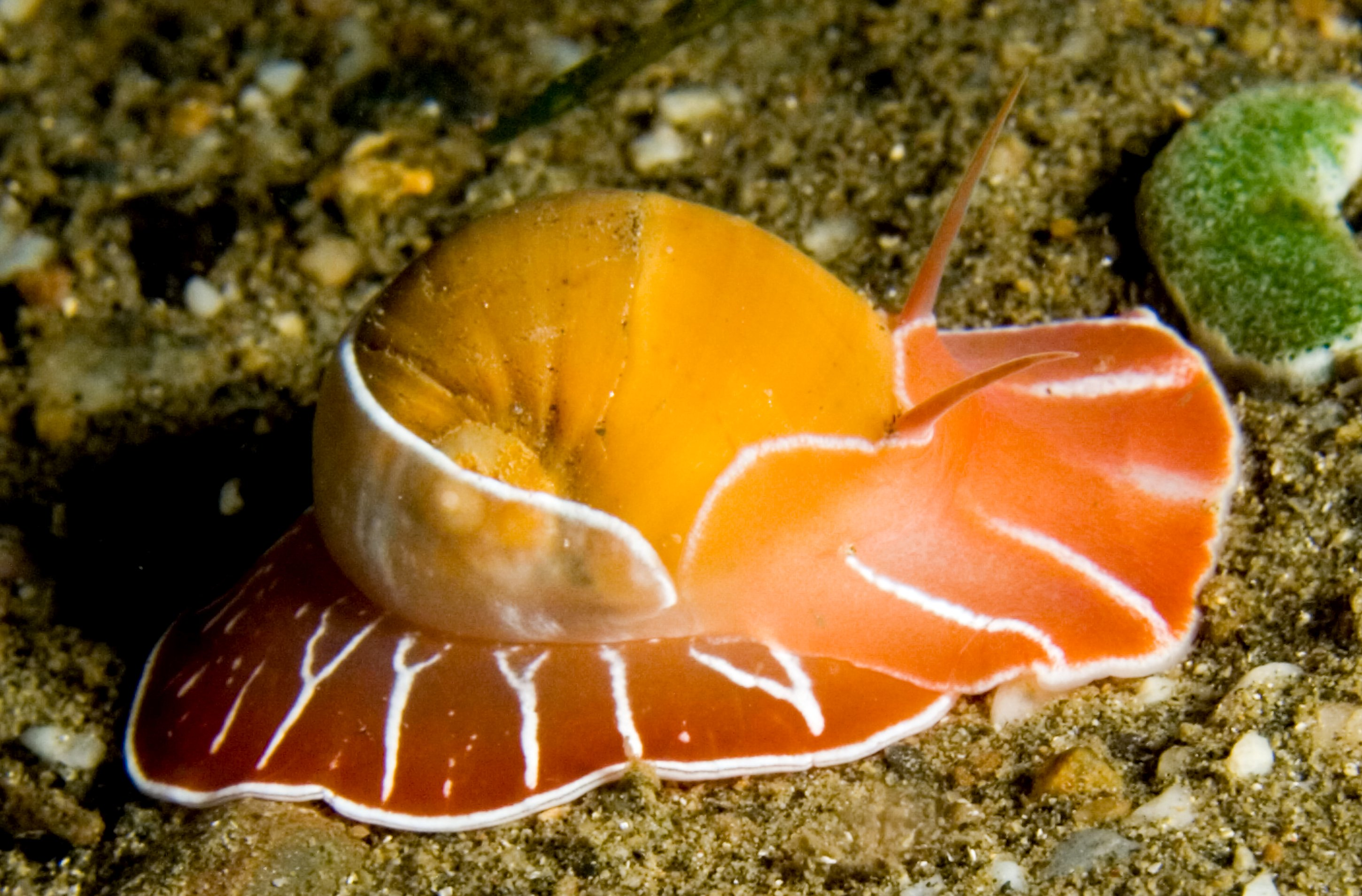
- A living Naticarius moon sea snail
  Naticarius
  - †Naticarius reversa
  - †Naticarius semilunata
- Natrix
  - †Natrix erythrogaster
- †Navajovius
  - †Navajovius kohlhaasae
- Nectandra
  - †Nectandra lancifolia
- †Nekrolagus
  - †Nekrolagus progressus
- Nemocardium
  - †Nemocardium actium
  - †Nemocardium gambrinum
  - †Nemocardium quihi
- †Nemodon
  - †Nemodon eufaulensis
- †Neochoerus – type locality for genus
  - †Neochoerus pinckneyi
- Neofiber
  - †Neofiber leonardi
- Neogale
  - †Neogale vison
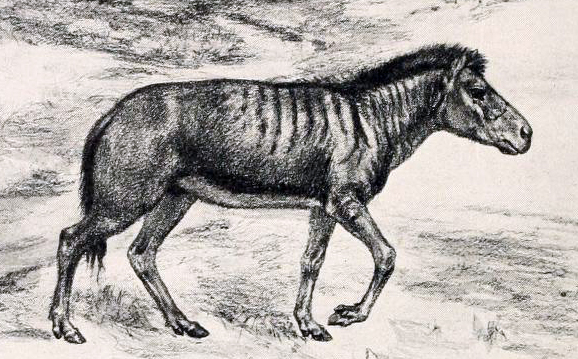
- Life restoration of a herd of Neohipparion. Robert Bruce Horsfall (1913).
  †Neohipparion
  - †Neohipparion affine
  - †Neohipparion eurystyle – type locality for species
  - †Neohipparion leptode
- †Neonatrix
  - †Neonatrix elongata
  - †Neonatrix infera – type locality for species
- Neotamias
  - †Neotamias cinereicollis
- Neotoma
  - †Neotoma albigula
  - †Neotoma floridana
  - †Neotoma fossilis – or unidentified comparable form
  - †Neotoma mexicana
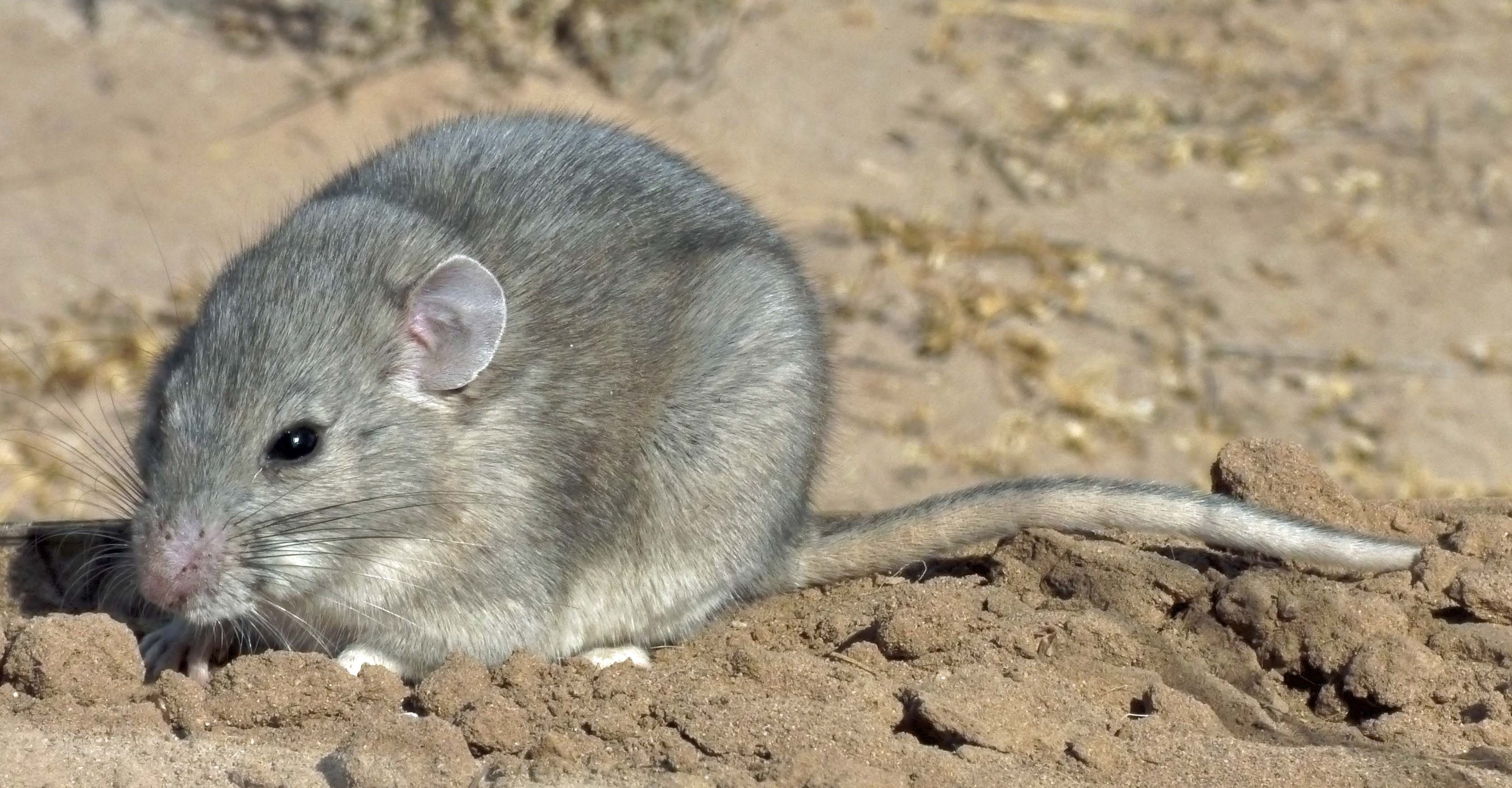
  - A living Neotoma micropus, or southern Plains woodrat
    †Neotoma micropus
  - †Neotoma minutus
  - †Neotoma quadriplicata
- †Neozanthopsis
  - †Neozanthopsis americanus
- Neptunea – report made of unidentified related form or using admittedly obsolete nomenclature
- Nerodia
  - †Nerodia fasciata
- †Nerterogeomys
  - †Nerterogeomys paenebursarius
- Neverita
- †Nexuotapirus
  - †Nexuotapirus marslandensis
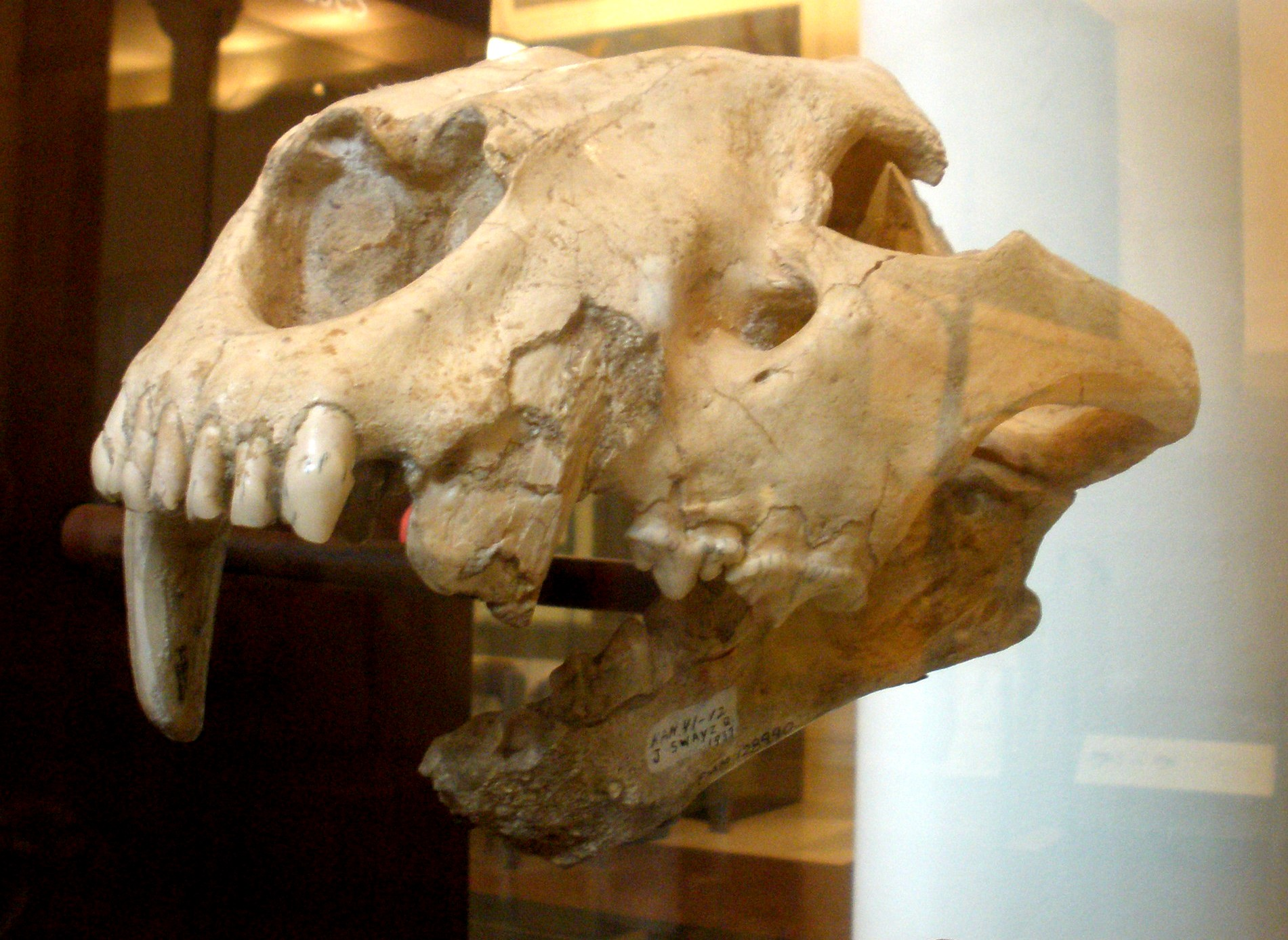
- Fossilized partial cranium of the Miocene saber-toothed cat Nimravides
  †Nimravides
  - †Nimravides hibbardi – type locality for species
  - †Nimravides thinobates – or unidentified comparable form
- Niptus
  - †Niptus abstrusus
- †Nonomys
  - †Nonomys simplicidens
- Norrisia
  - †Norrisia micromphala
- †Notharctus
  - †Notharctus tenebrosus
- †Nothokemas
  - †Nothokemas floridanus
  - †Nothokemas hidalgensis – type locality for species
- †Nothotylopus
  - †Nothotylopus camptognathus
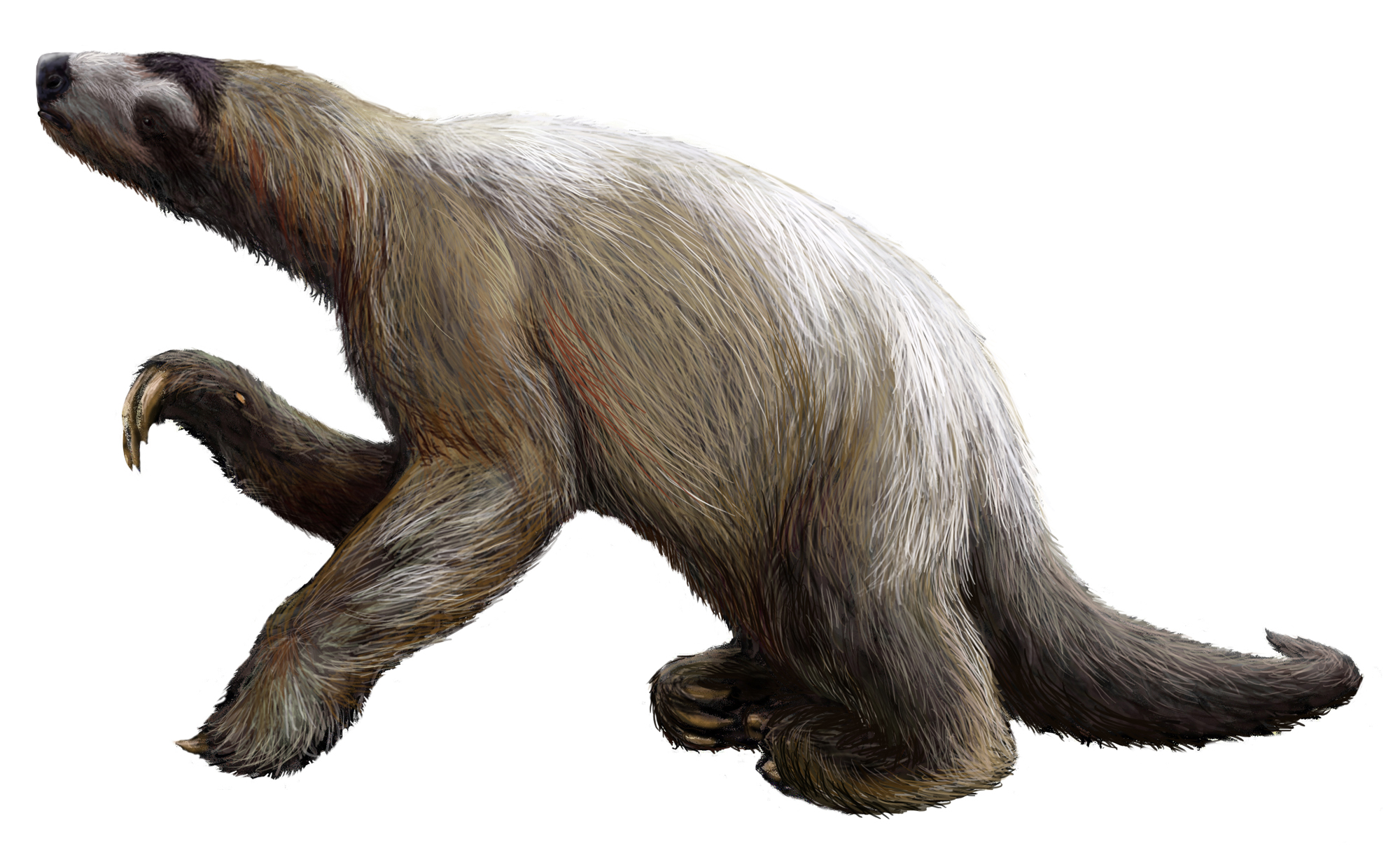
- Life restoration of the Pleistocene ground sloth Nothrotheriops
  †Nothrotheriops
  - †Nothrotheriops texanus
- †Nothrotherium
  - †Nothrotherium shastense
- Notiosorex
  - †Notiosorex crawfordi
  - †Notiosorex jacksoni
- †Notiotitanops
  - †Notiotitanops mississippiensis
- †Notolagus
  - †Notolagus lepusculus
- Notophthalmus
  - †Notophthalmus slaughteri – type locality for species
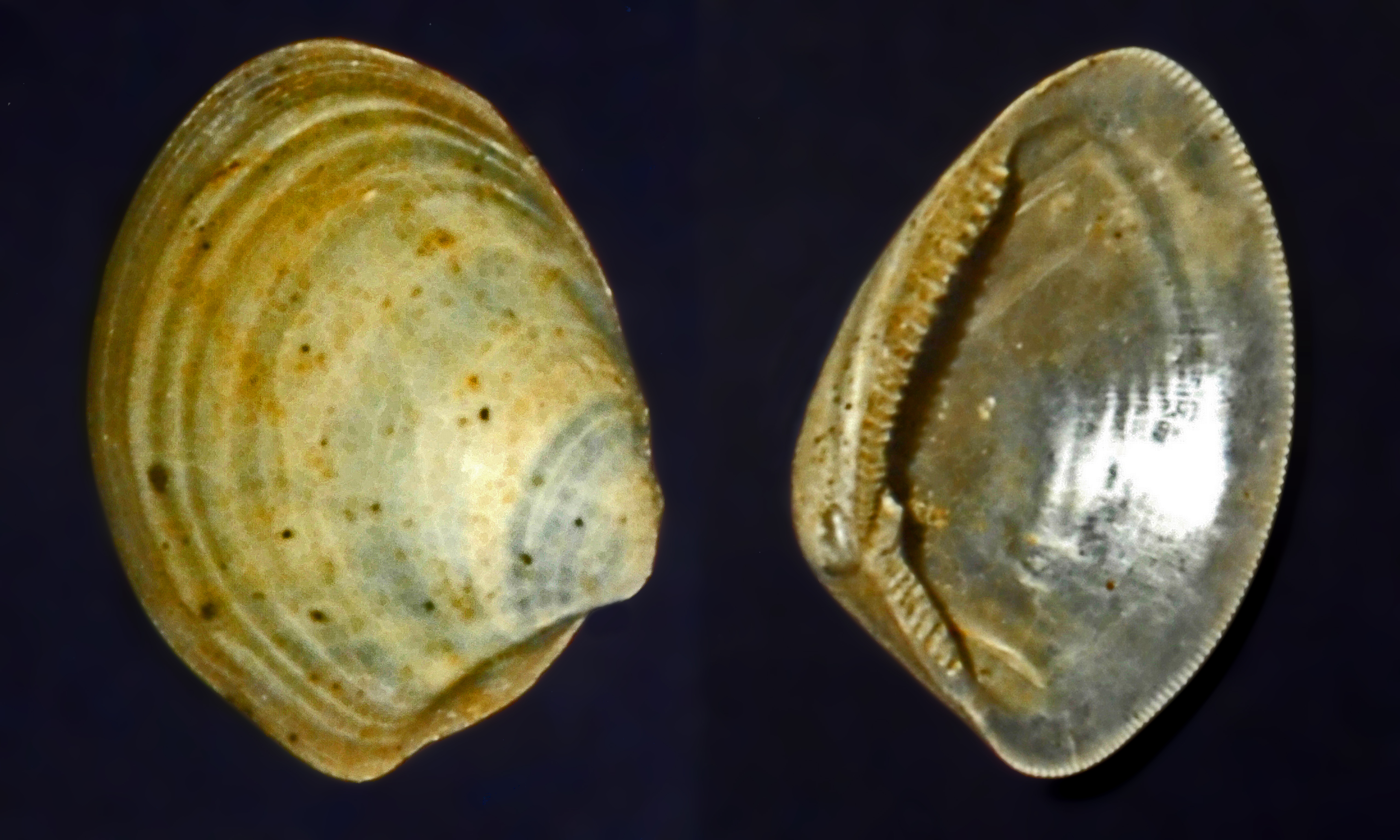
- Interior of a fossilized shell of the Early Ordovician-modern marine bivalve Nucula
  Nucula
  - †Nucula cochlear – type locality for species
  - †Nucula magnifica
  - †Nucula mauricensis
  - †Nucula mediavia
  - †Nucula smithvillensis
- Nuculana
  - †Nuculana aldrichiana
  - †Nuculana corpulentoides
  - †Nuculana demissa – type locality for species
  - †Nuculana eoa
  - †Nuculana jewetti
  - †Nuculana milamensis
  - †Nuculana ovula
  - †Nuculana saffordana
  - †Nuculana smithvillensis – or unidentified related form
  - †Nuculana travisana – or unidentified comparable form
  - †Nuculana trivitate
  - †Nuculana turgeo – type locality for species
- †Nudivagus
- †Nuulana
  - †Nuulana turgeo – type locality for species
- Nysius – tentative report

== O ==
- Oculina
  - †Oculina singleyi – type locality for species
- Odocoileus
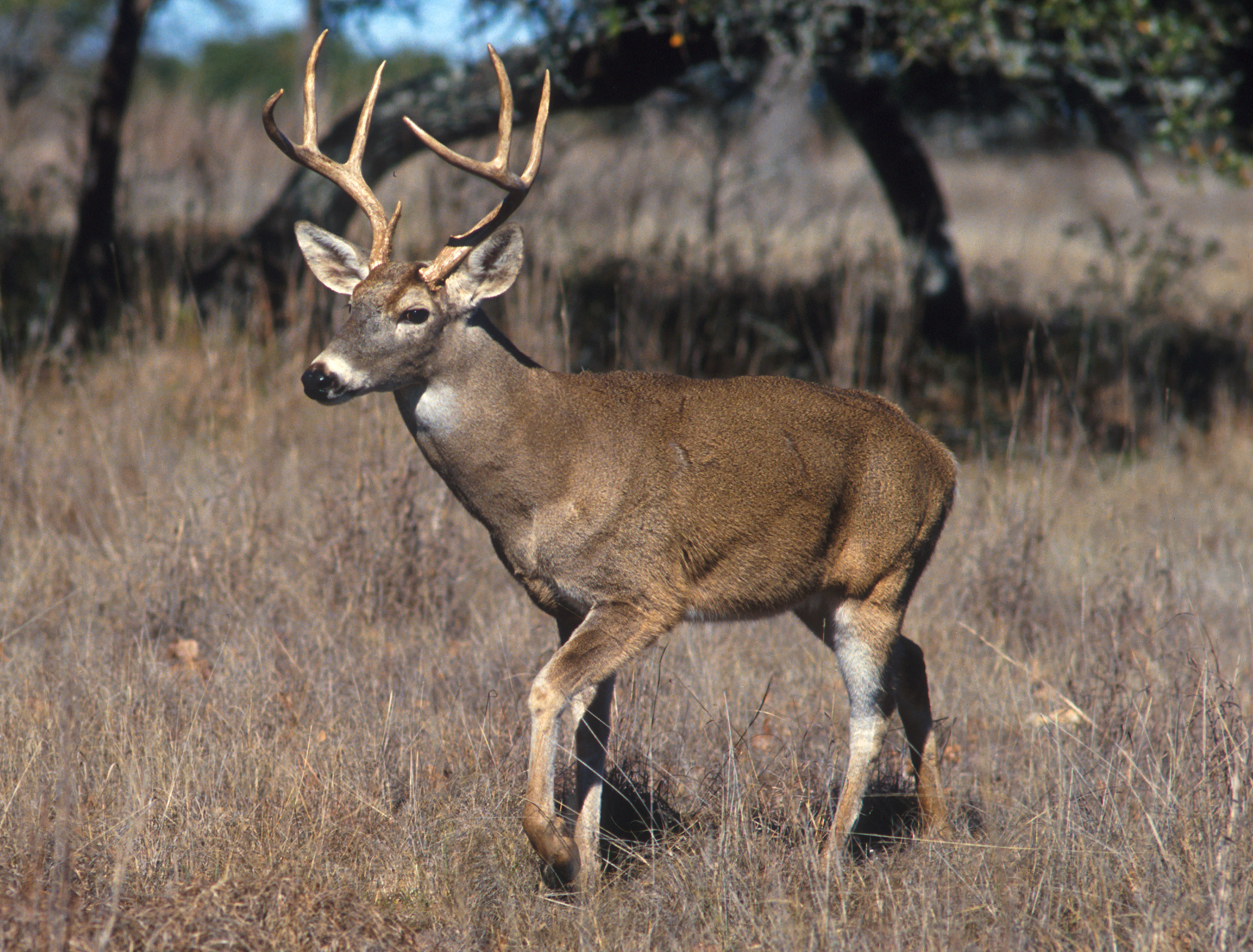
  - A living Odocoileus virginianus, or white-tailed deer
    †Odocoileus virginianus
- Odontaspis
  - †Odontaspis exilis – type locality for species
- †Odontopolys
  - †Odontopolys compsorhytis
- Odostomia
  - †Odostomia ova – type locality for species
  - †Odostomia trapaquara
- Ogmodontomys
  - †Ogmodontomys poaphagus
- †Ogmophis
  - †Ogmophis miocompactus
- Olivella
  - †Olivella mediavia
- †Omomys
  - †Omomys carteri
  - †Omomys lloydi
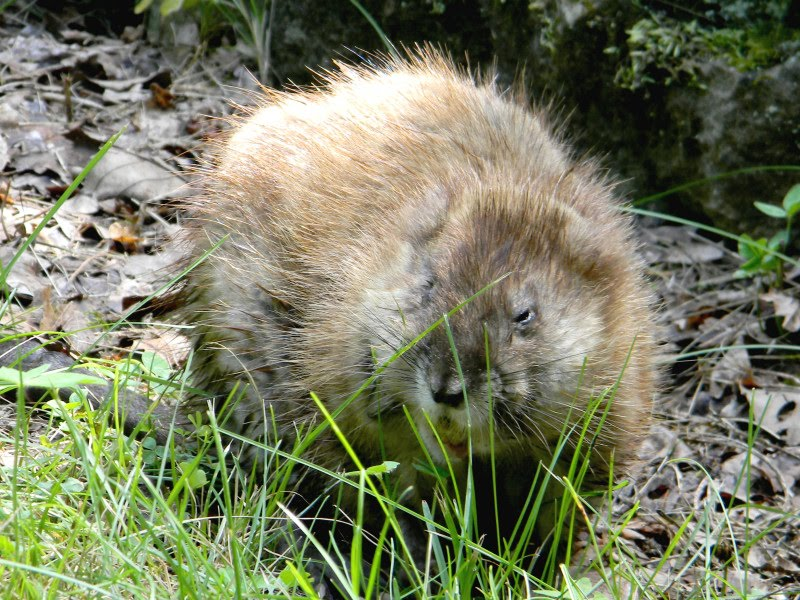
- A living Ondatra, or muskrat
  Ondatra
  - †Ondatra annectens
  - †Ondatra idahoensis – or unidentified comparable form
  - †Ondatra zibethicus
- Onychomys
  - †Onychomys gidleyi
  - †Onychomys hollisteri
  - †Onychomys leucogaster
  - †Onychomys pedroensis
  - †Onychomys torridus
- Opalia
  - †Opalia cooperi – type locality for species
- Opheodrys
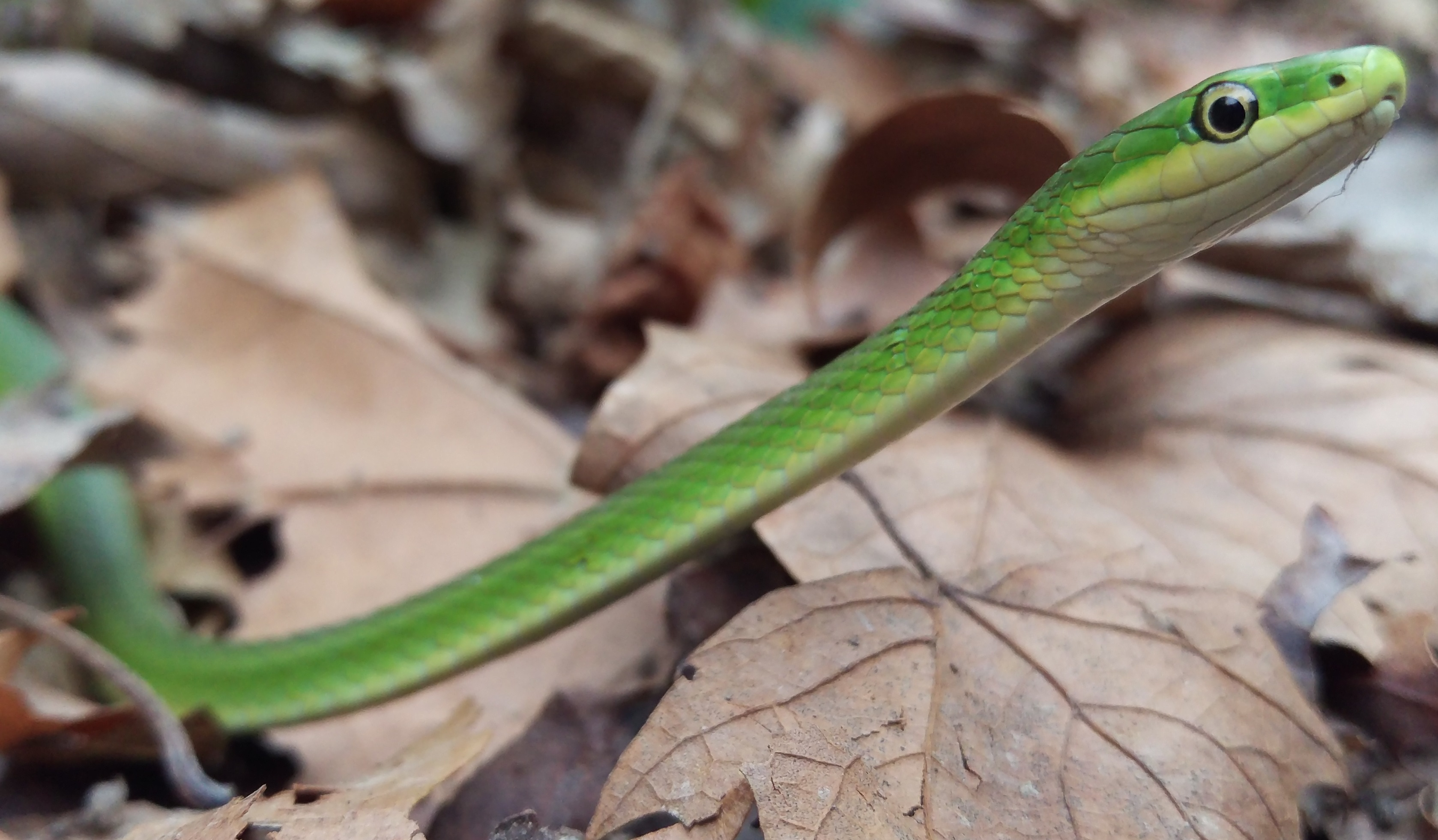
  - A living Opheodrys aestivus, or rough green snake
    †Opheodrys aestivus
- Ophisaurus
- †Oreodaphne
  - †Oreodaphne obtusifolia
  - †Oreodaphne perseaformis
  - †Oreodaphne pseudoguianensis
- †Oromeryx
- †Orthosurcula
  - †Orthosurcula adeona
  - †Orthosurcula francescae
  - †Orthosurcula indenta
  - †Orthosurcula langdoni – or unidentified comparable form
  - †Orthosurcula longipersa
  - †Orthosurcula persa
  - †Orthosurcula phoenicea
- Orthoyoldia
  - †Orthoyoldia petropolitana
  - †Orthoyoldia psammotaea
- Oryzomys
  - †Oryzomys palustris
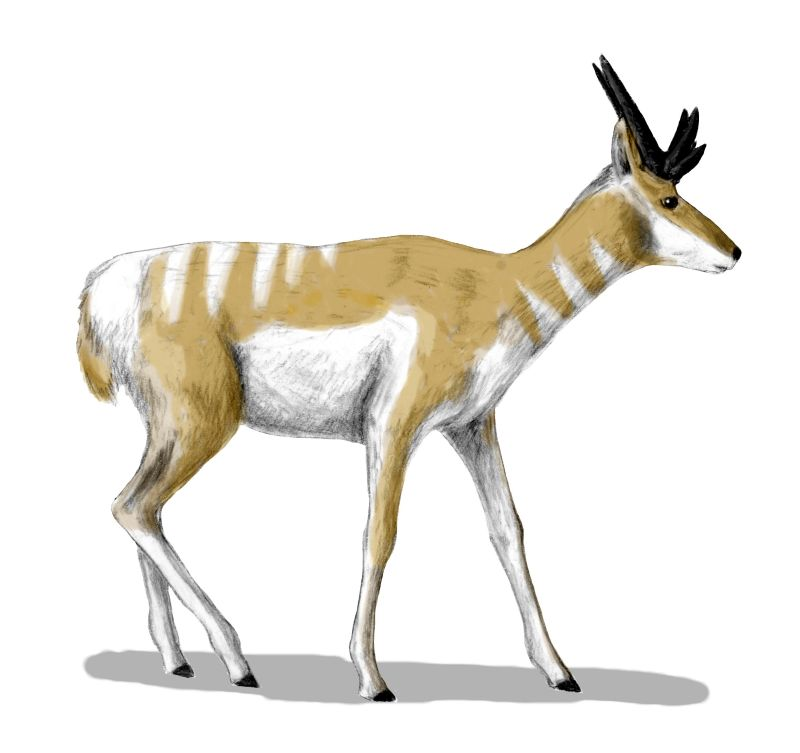
- Life restoration of the Miocene pronghorn Osbornoceros
  †Osbornoceros – tentative report
- Ostrea
  - †Ostrea crenulimarginata
  - †Ostrea duvali
  - †Ostrea frithi
  - †Ostrea kochae
  - †Ostrea multilirata
  - †Ostrea normalis
  - †Ostrea pulaskensis
  - †Ostrea semmesi
  - †Ostrea sinuosa
- Otionella
  - †Otionella tuberosa
- †Otostomia
  - †Otostomia melanella
  - †Otostomia trapaquara
- †Ourayia
  - †Ourayia hopsoni
  - †Ourayia uintensis
- Ovis
  - †Ovis canadensis
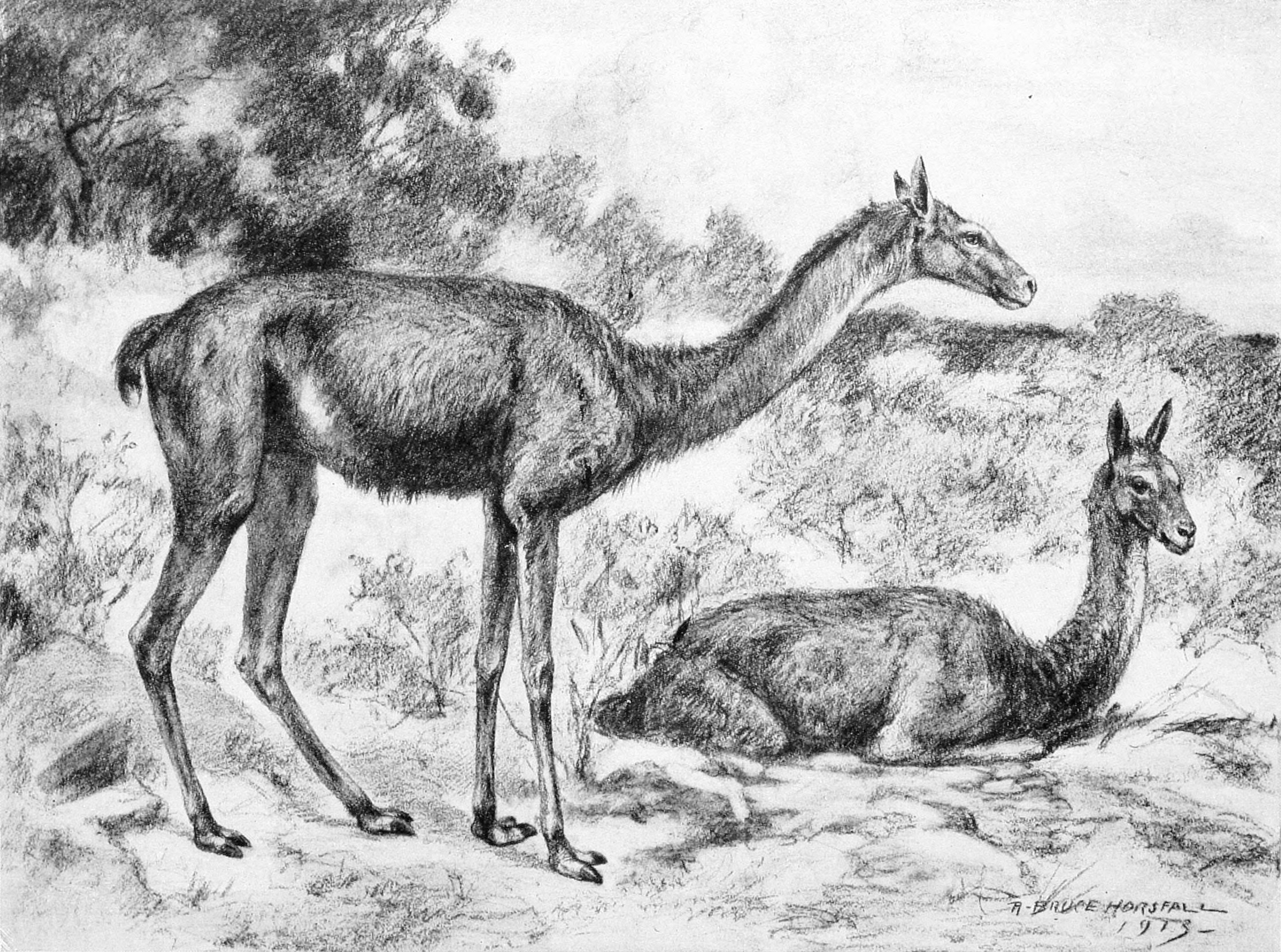
- Life restoration of a pair of the Oligocene-Miocene camel Oxydactylus. Robert Bruce Horsfall (1913).
  †Oxydactylus
  - †Oxydactylus benedentatus – type locality for species

== P ==
- †Pachecoa
  - †Pachecoa adamsi
  - †Pachecoa concentrica – type locality for species
  - †Pachecoa decisa
  - †Pachecoa microcancellata
  - †Pachecoa ovalis
  - †Pachecoa pulchra
  - †Pachecoa sabinica
  - †Pachecoa smithvillensis
- †Paenemarmota
  - †Paenemarmota barbouri
- †Palaechthon
  - †Palaechthon woodi – or unidentified comparable form
- †Palaeictops – tentative report
- †Palaeolama
  - †Palaeolama mirifica
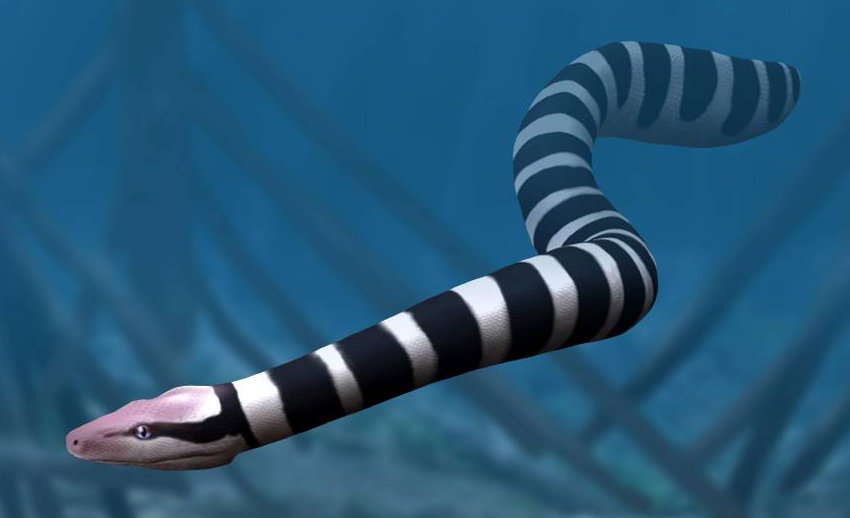
- Restoration of the Cretaceous-Eocene sea snake Palaeophis
  †Palaeophis
- †Palaeorhaphis
  - †Palaeorhaphis palaeocenica – type locality for species
- †Paleoheterodon
  - †Paleoheterodon tiheni
- †Paleotomus
  - †Paleotomus senior
- Panopea
- Panthera
  - †Panthera leo
  - †Panthera onca
- †Papillina
  - †Papillina dumosa
- †Paracryptotis
  - †Paracryptotis rex
- Paracyathus
  - †Paracyathus alternatus
  - †Paracyathus bastropensis – type locality for species
- †Paraenhydrocyon
  - †Paraenhydrocyon wallovianus
- †Parahippus
  - †Parahippus leonensis – type locality for species
- †Parahyus
  - †Parahyus vagus
- †Paralbula
  - †Paralbula marylandica
- †Paramerychyus
  - †Paramerychyus harrisonensis
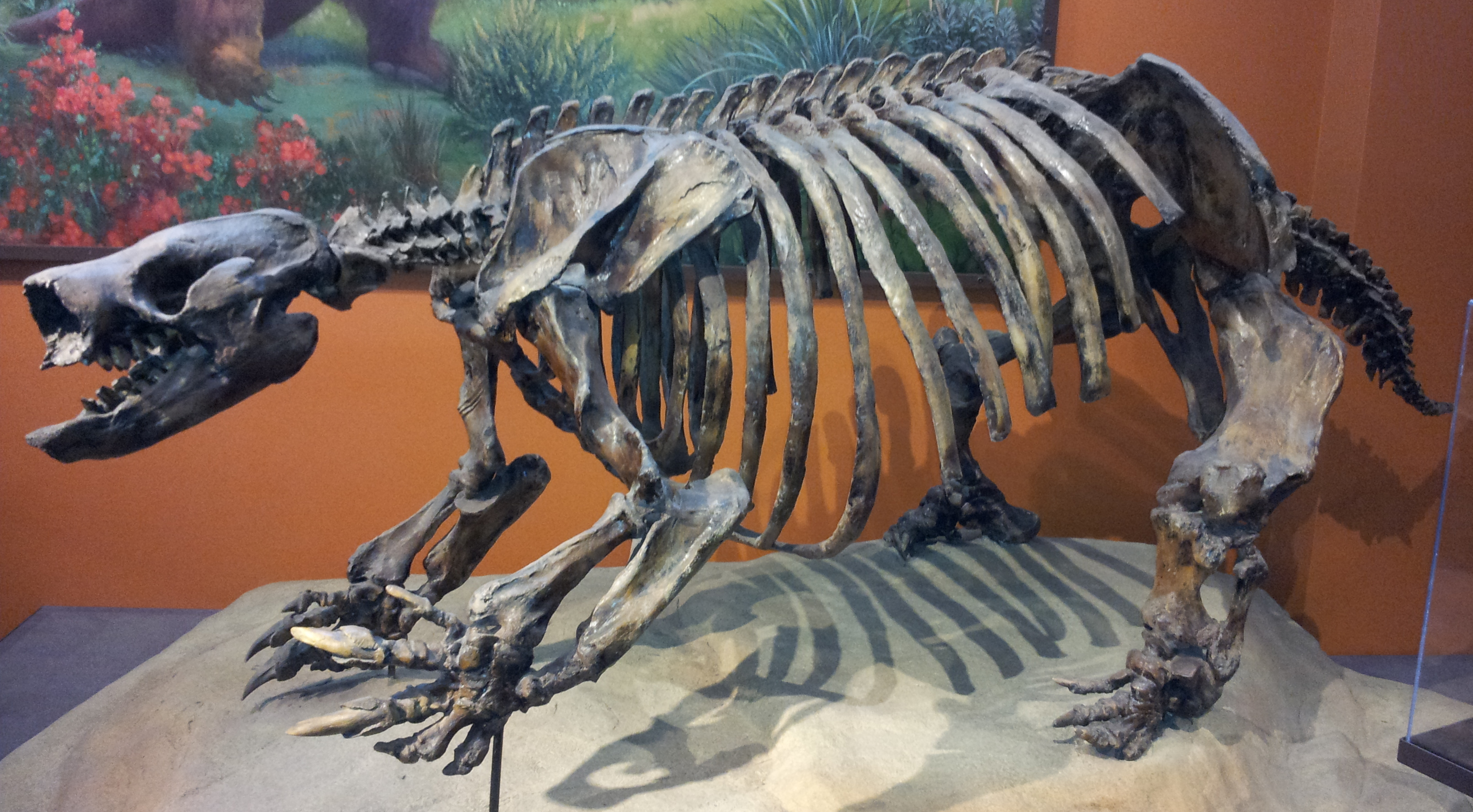
- Fossilized skeleton of the Pliocene-Pleistocene ground sloth Paramylodon
  †Paramylodon
  - †Paramylodon harlani
- †Paramys
  - †Paramys delicatior – or unidentified comparable form
  - †Paramys excavatus
  - †Paramys leptodus
- †Paraoreomunea
- †Parapavo
  - †Parapavo californicus
- †Parapotos – type locality for genus
  - †Parapotos tedfordi – type locality for species
- †Paratoceras
  - †Paratoceras macadamsi – type locality for species
  - †Paratoceras wardi – type locality for species
- †Paratomarctus
  - †Paratomarctus euthos
  - †Paratomarctus temerarius
- Parbatmya – type locality for genus
  - †Parbatmya brazosensis
  - †Parbatmya fornicata – type locality for species
- †Parectypodus
  - †Parectypodus sloani
- †Pareumys
  - †Pareumys boskeyi
- †Paronychomys – tentative report
- †Parvitragulus
  - †Parvitragulus priscus
- †Parvobalanus – type locality for genus
  - †Parvobalanus gracilis – type locality for species
- †Patulaxis
  - †Patulaxis scrobiculata
- †Pauromys
  - †Pauromys simplex – type locality for species
  - †Pauromys texensis
- †Pediomeryx
  - †Pediomeryx hemphillensis – type locality for species
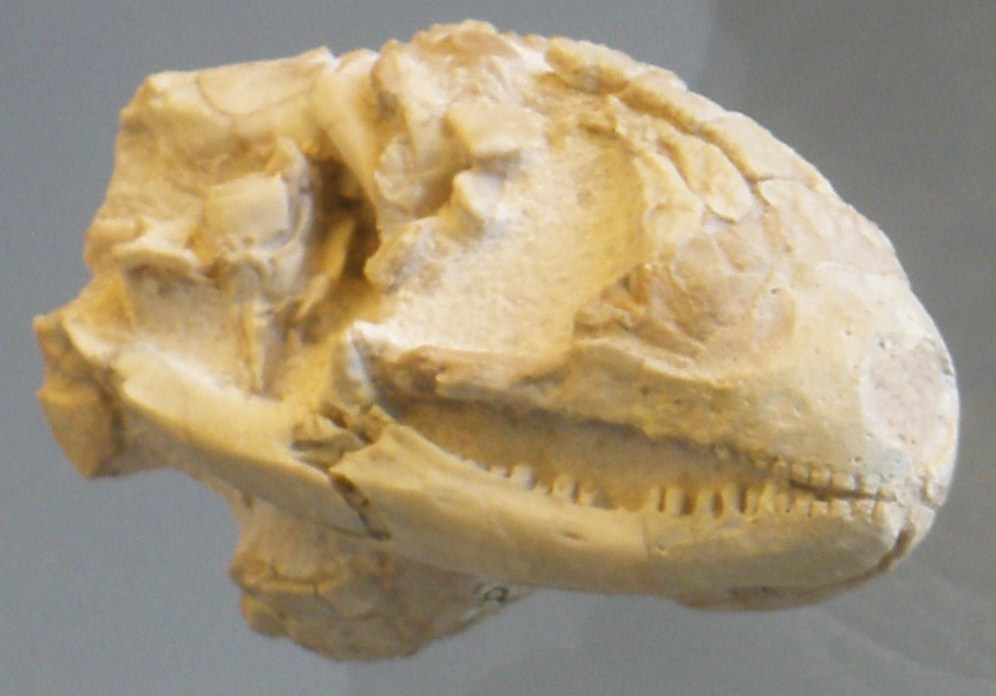
- Fossilized skull of the Eocene-Oligocene lizard Peltosaurus
  †Peltosaurus – tentative report
- †Penetrigonias
  - †Penetrigonias dakotensis
- †Peraceras
  - †Peraceras hessei
  - †Peraceras superciliosum
- †Peradectes – tentative report
- †Peratherium
  - †Peratherium comstocki
  - †Peratherium marsupium
- Periploma
  - †Periploma collardi
  - †Periploma howei
- †Periptychus
  - †Periptychus carinidens
- Perognathus
  - †Perognathus carpenteri – type locality for species
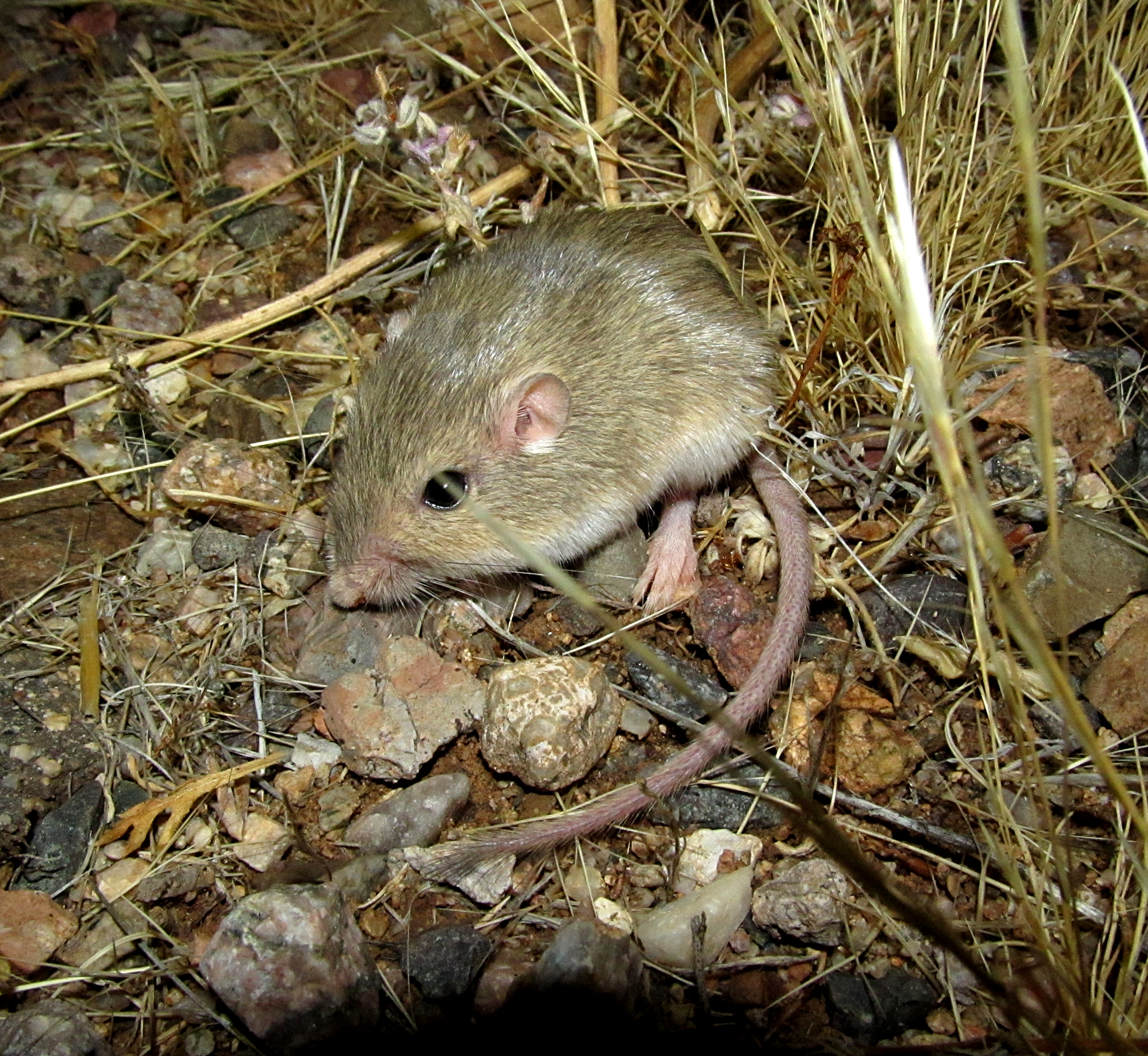
  - A living Perognathus flavus, or silky pocket mouse
    †Perognathus flavus
  - †Perognathus pearlettensis
  - †Perognathus rexroadensis – or unidentified comparable form
- Peromyscus
  - †Peromyscus boylii
  - †Peromyscus cragini
  - †Peromyscus difficilis
  - †Peromyscus eremicus
  - †Peromyscus gossypinus
  - †Peromyscus kansasensis
  - †Peromyscus leucopus
  - †Peromyscus maniculatus
  - †Peromyscus pectoralis
  - †Peromyscus progressus – or unidentified comparable form
- †Petauristodon
  - †Petauristodon jamesi
  - †Petauristodon minimus – or unidentified comparable form
- Petrophyllia
  - †Petrophyllia singleyi
- †Pewelagus
  - †Pewelagus dawsonae
- Phacoides
- Phaedon – or unidentified comparable form
- Phalium
  - †Phalium brevicostatum
  - †Phalium reklawensis – type locality for species
- †Phelopteria
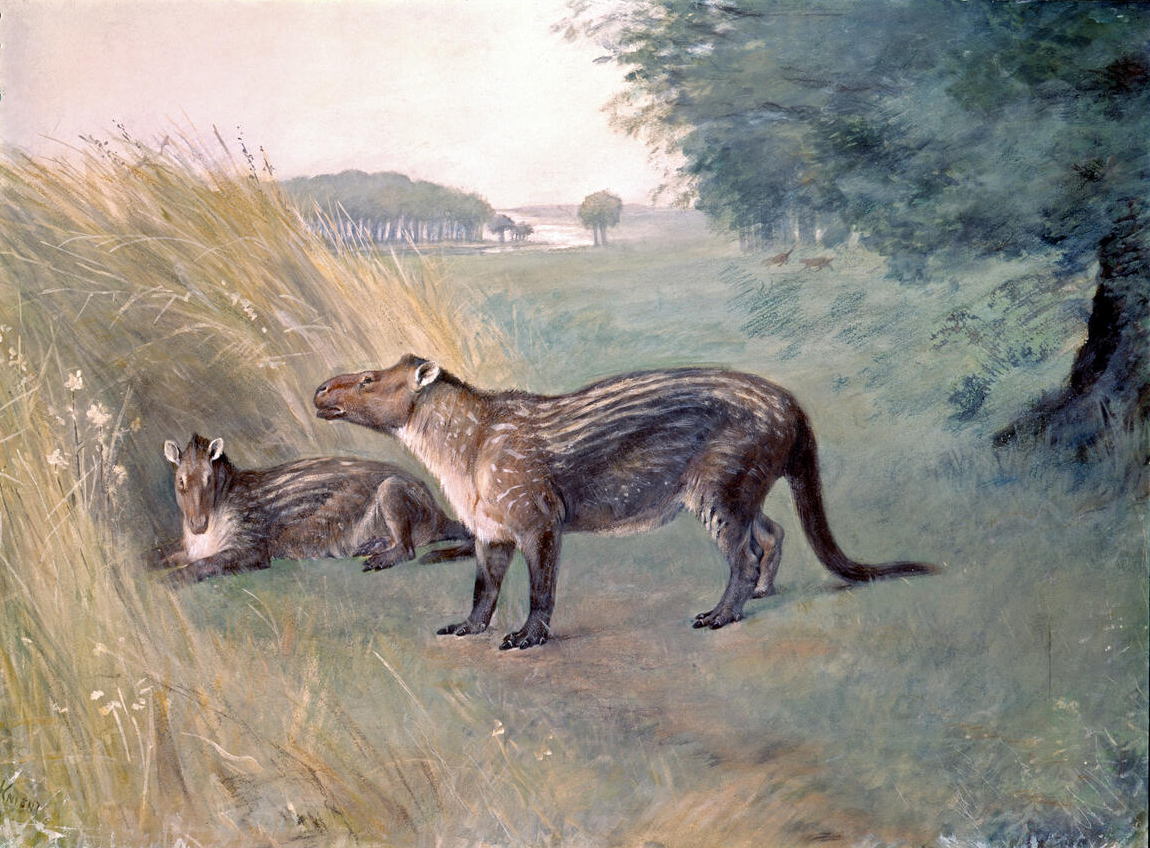
- Life restoration of the Paleocene-Eocene ungulate Phenacodus. Charles R. Knight (1898).
  †Phenacodus
  - †Phenacodus bisonensis
  - †Phenacodus grangeri
  - †Phenacodus matthewi
- Philine
- †Phlaocyon
  - †Phlaocyon annectens
  - †Phlaocyon minor
- Pholadomya
  - †Pholadomya harrisi
  - †Pholadomya leonensis
  - †Pholadomya petropolitana
- Pholas
- Phos
  - †Phos sagenum
  - †Phos texanum
- Phrynosoma
  - †Phrynosoma cornutum
- Phyllodus
- Physa
  - †Physa anatina
  - †Physa gyrina
- †Physocypria
  - †Physocypria pustulosa
- Pinna – tentative report
- Pisidium
  - †Pisidium nitidum
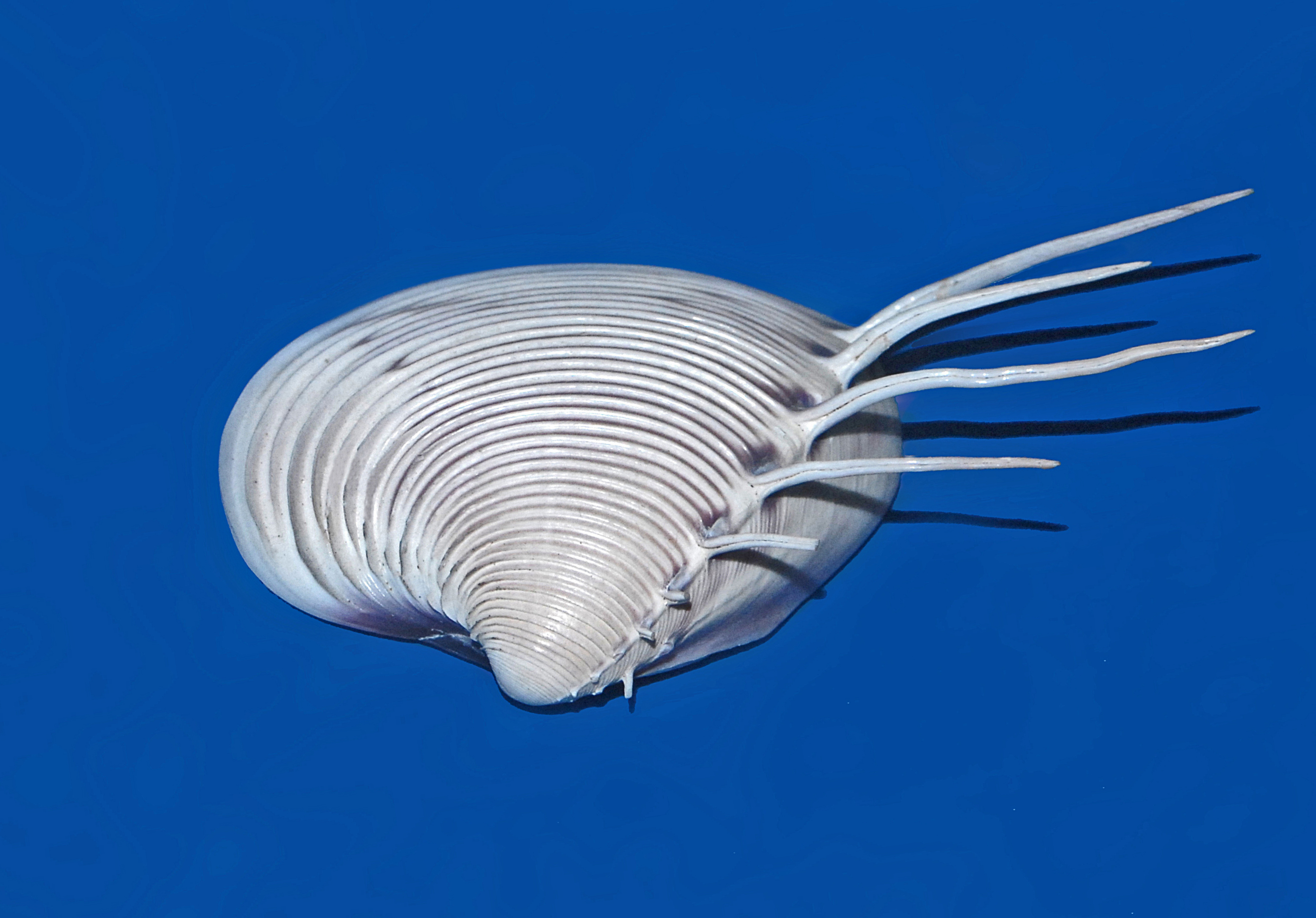
- Shell of a Pitar venus clam
  Pitar
  - †Pitar angelinae
  - †Pitar biboraensis
  - †Pitar gazleyensis
  - †Pitar hawtofi
  - †Pitar juliae
  - †Pitar kempae
  - †Pitar nuttalliopsis
  - †Pitar petropolitanus
  - †Pitar pteleina
  - †Pitar pteleinus
  - †Pitar ripleyanus
  - †Pitar texacola
  - †Pitar texibrazus
  - †Pitar tornadonis
  - †Pitar trigoniata
  - †Pitar turneri – type locality for species
- Pituophis
  - †Pituophis melanoleucus
- †Plagiarca
  - †Plagiarca rhomboidella
  - †Plagiarca vaughani
- Plagiocardium – or unidentified comparable form
- Planorbis
  - †Planorbis andersoni
- †Planorbula
  - †Planorbula armigera
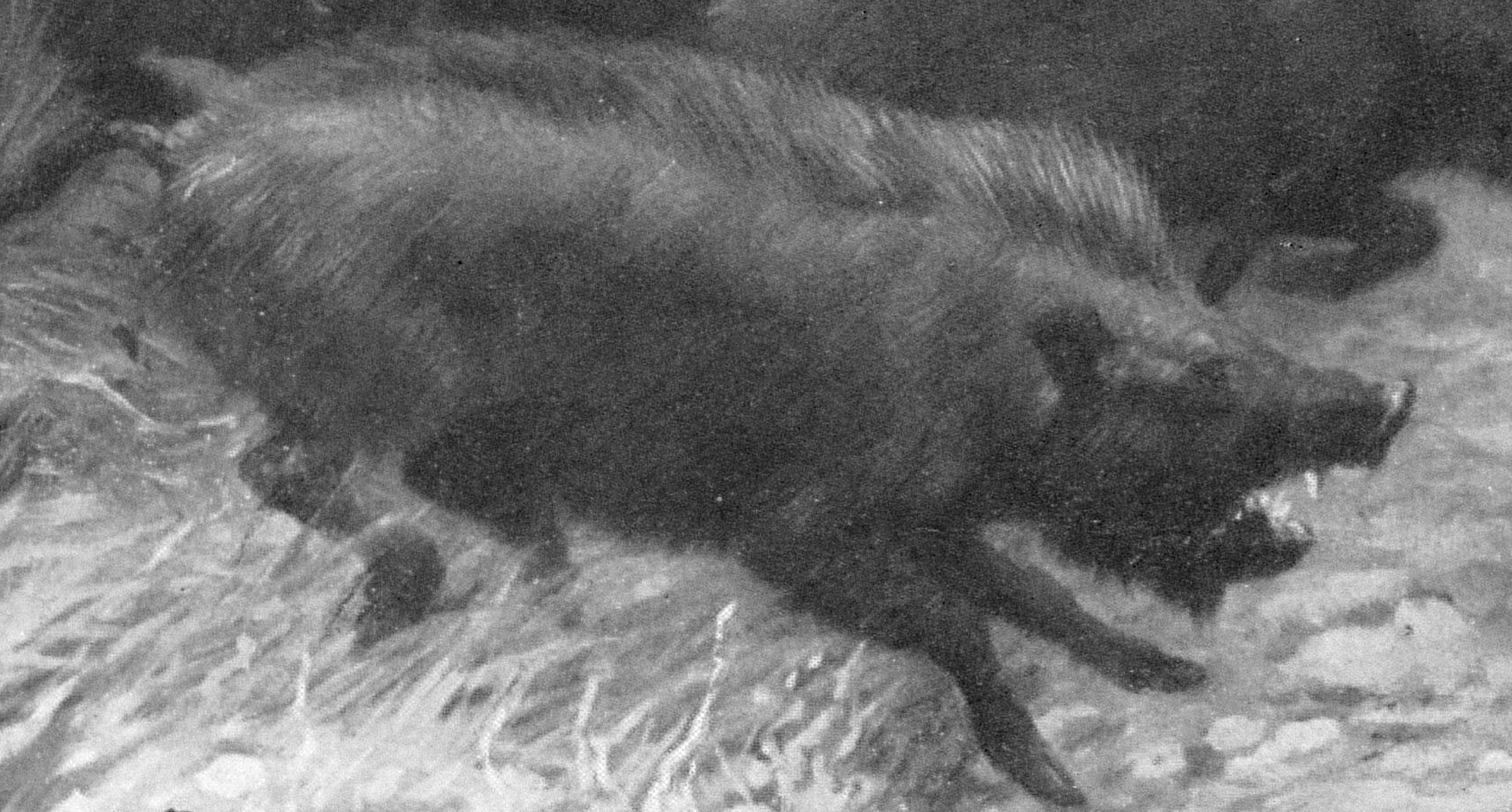
- Restoration of a herd of alarmed Miocene-Pleistocene peccaries of the genus Platygonus. Charles R. Knight (1922).
  †Platygonus
  - †Platygonus bicalcaratus
  - †Platygonus compressus
  - †Platygonus pollenae
  - †Platygonus vetus
- Platytrochus
  - †Platytrochus primaevus – type locality for species
  - †Platytrochus stokesi
- †Pleiolama
  - †Pleiolama vera
- †Plesiocolopirus
  - †Plesiocolopirus hancocki – or unidentified comparable form
- †Plesiogulo
  - †Plesiogulo marshalli
- †Plesiolestes
  - †Plesiolestes nacimienti
- †Plesiosminthus
- †Pleuofusia – tentative report
  - †Pleuofusia huppertzi – type locality for species
- Pleurocera
  - †Pleurocera acutum
- Pleurofusia
  - †Pleurofusia huppertzi
  - †Pleurofusia longirostropis
  - †Pleurofusia prosseri
- †Pleurolicus
  - †Pleurolicus sellardsi
- †Pleuroliria
- Pleuromeris
  - †Pleuromeris leonensis
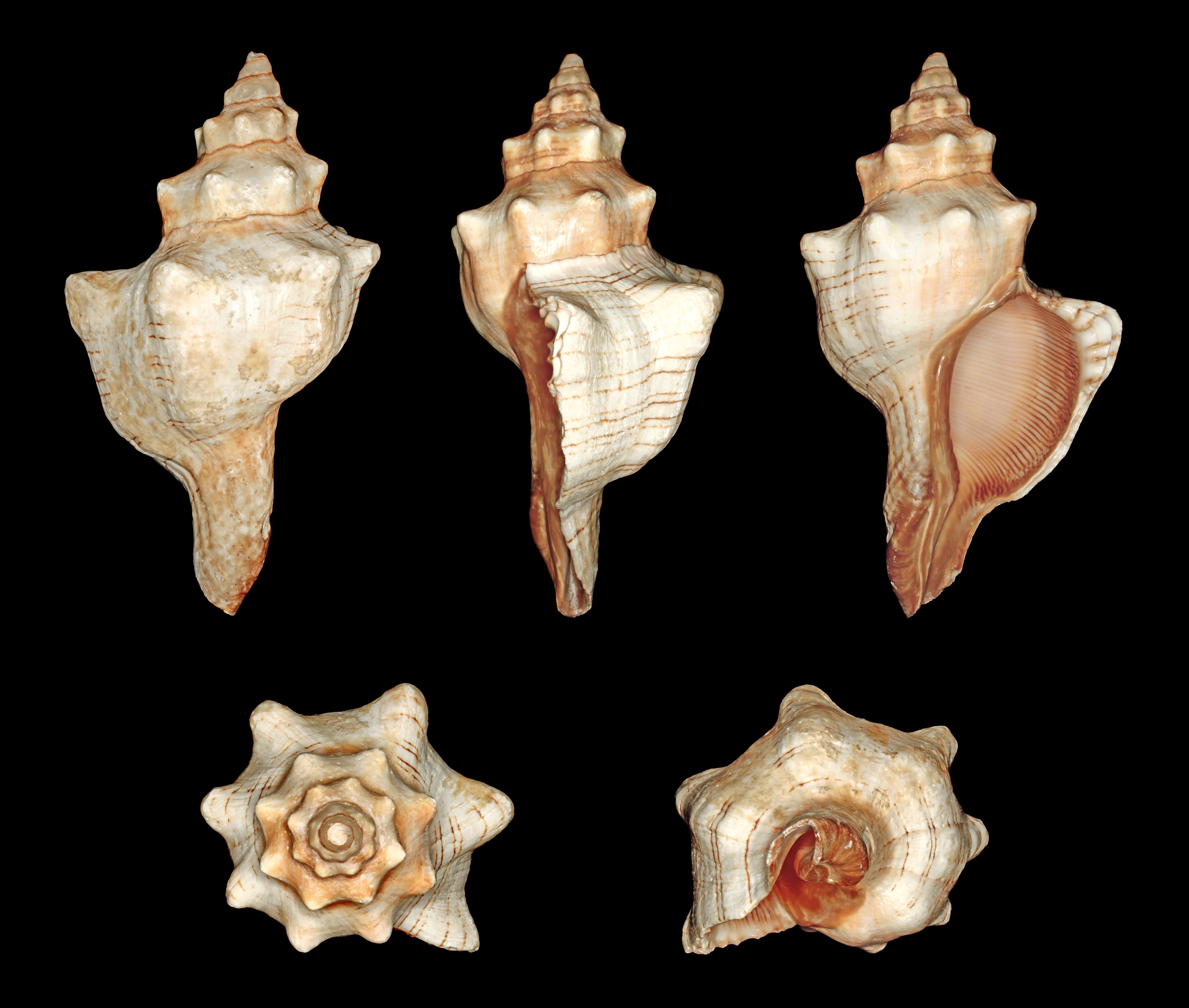
- Shell in multiple views of a Pleuroploca sea snail
  Pleuroploca
  - †Pleuroploca plummeri – or unidentified related form
- †Pleurostoma
  - †Pleurostoma adolescens
- Pleurotomella
  - †Pleurotomella veatchi
  - †Pleurotomella whitfieldi
- Plicatula
  - †Plicatula filamentosa
  - †Plicatula pustula – type locality for species
- Pliciscala
  - †Pliciscala albitesta
- †Plinthicus
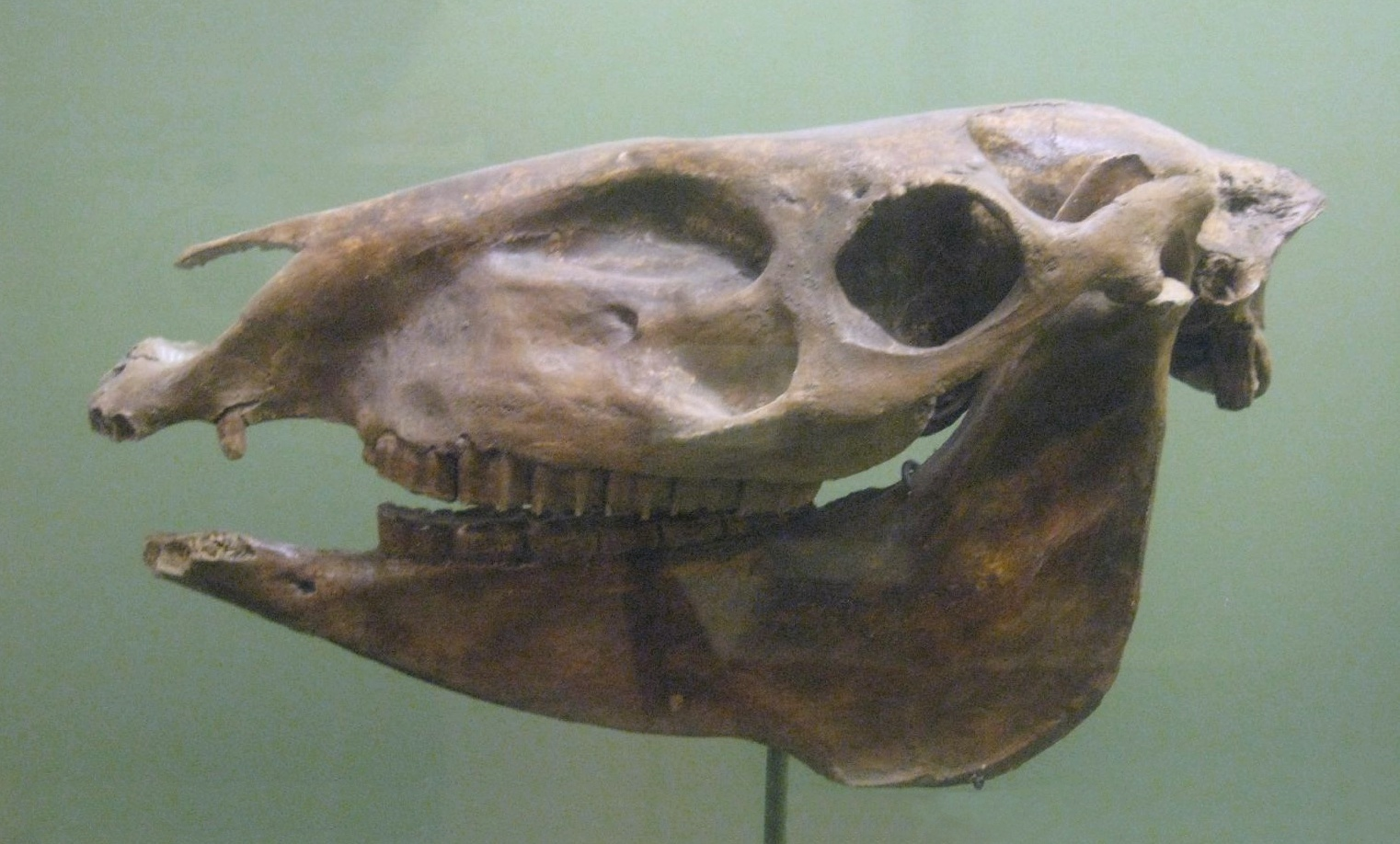
- Fossilized skull of the Miocene horse Pliohippus
  †Pliohippus
  - †Pliohippus fossulatus
  - †Pliohippus nobilis
  - †Pliohippus pernix
  - †Pliohippus spectans – tentative report
- †Pliometanastes
  - †Pliometanastes protistus – or unidentified comparable form
- †Pliosaccomys
  - †Pliosaccomys higginsensis
- †Pliotaxidea
  - †Pliotaxidea nevadensis – or unidentified comparable form
- †Plotophysops – tentative report
  - †Plotophysops angularis – type locality for species
- †Poabromylus
  - †Poabromylus kayi
- Podomys
  - †Podomys oklahomensis
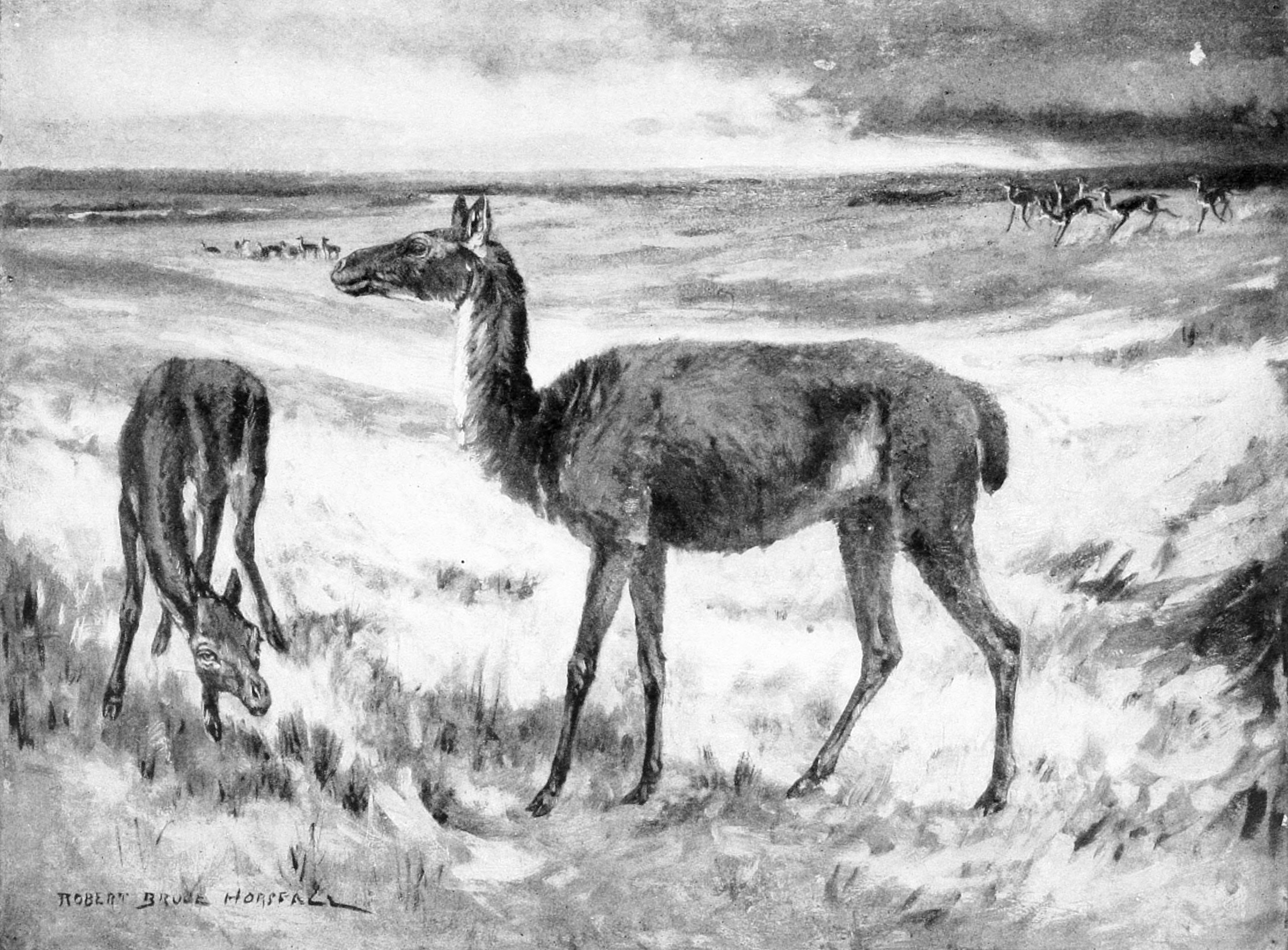
- Life restoration of the Eocene-Oligocene camel Poebrotherium
  †Poebrotherium
  - †Poebrotherium chadronense – type locality for species
  - †Poebrotherium franki – type locality for species
- †Polidevcia
  - †Polidevcia magna
- Polinices
  - †Polinices aratus
  - †Polinices eminulus
  - †Polinices harrisii
  - †Polinices julianna
  - †Polinices onustus – type locality for species
- Polydora
- Polygyra
  - †Polygyra texasiana
- Polymorphina
  - †Polymorphina gibba
  - †Polymorphina regularis
- Polyschides
  - †Polyschides margarita
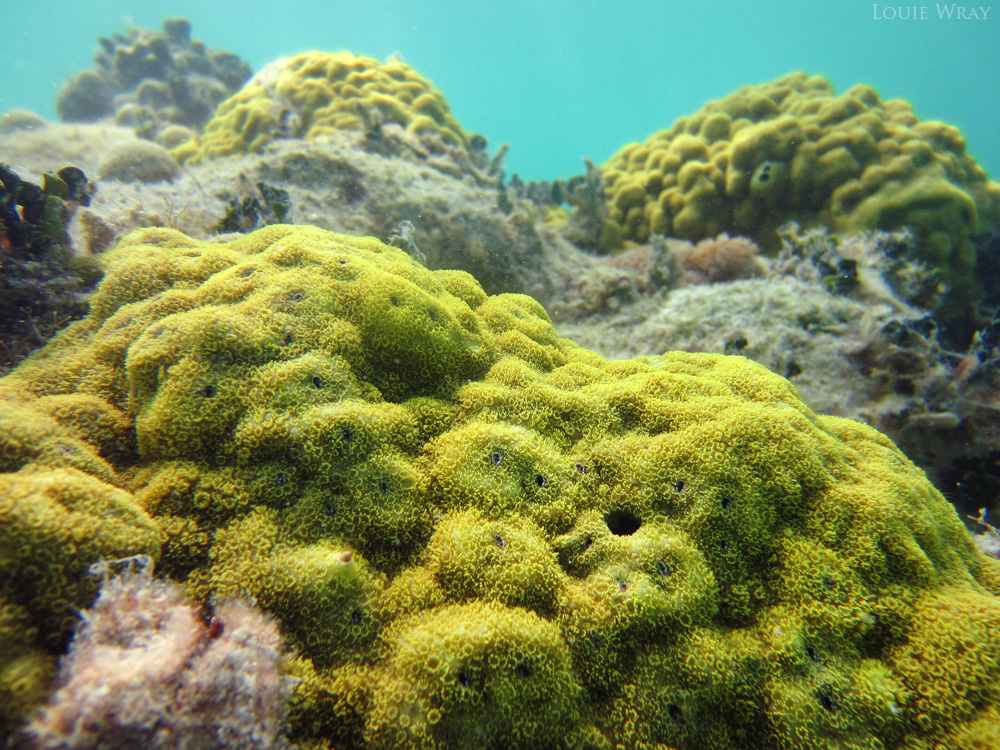
- Living Porites stony coral
  Porites
  - †Porites douvillei
- Poromya – or unidentified related form
- †Postalia
  - †Postalia americana – type locality for species
- †Potamides
  - †Potamides matsoni
- †Pratilepus
  - †Pratilepus kansasensis
- †Preophidion – type locality for genus
  - †Preophidion petropolis
  - †Preophidion stintoni – type locality for species
- Prionocidaris
  - †Prionocidaris cojimarensis
- †Priscocamelus
  - †Priscocamelus wilsoni
- †Priscoficus
  - †Priscoficus juvenis
- †Pristichampsus
- Pristis
- †Probassariscus
- †Problastomeryx
  - †Problastomeryx primus
- †Procamelus
  - †Procamelus grandis
  - †Procamelus leptognathus
  - †Procamelus occidentalis
- †Procastoroides
  - †Procastoroides sweeti
- †Procynodictis
  - †Procynodictis vulpiceps – or unidentified comparable form
- Procyon
  - †Procyon lotor
  - †Procyon rexroadensis
- †Prodipodomys
  - †Prodipodomys centralis
- †Progeomys
  - †Progeomys sulcatus – type locality for species
- †Prohesperocyon
  - †Prohesperocyon wilsoni
- †Proheteromys
  - †Proheteromys sabinensis – type locality for species
  - †Proheteromys toledoensis – type locality for species
- †Prolapsus
  - †Prolapsus junctionis – type locality for species
  - †Prolapsus sibilatoris – type locality for species
- †Promathildia
  - †Promathildia parvilis – or unidentified comparable form
  - †Promathildia parvula – or unidentified comparable form
- Promenetus
  - †Promenetus exacuous
- †Promioclaenus
  - †Promioclaenus acolytus
- †Proneofiber
  - †Proneofiber guildayi – type locality for species
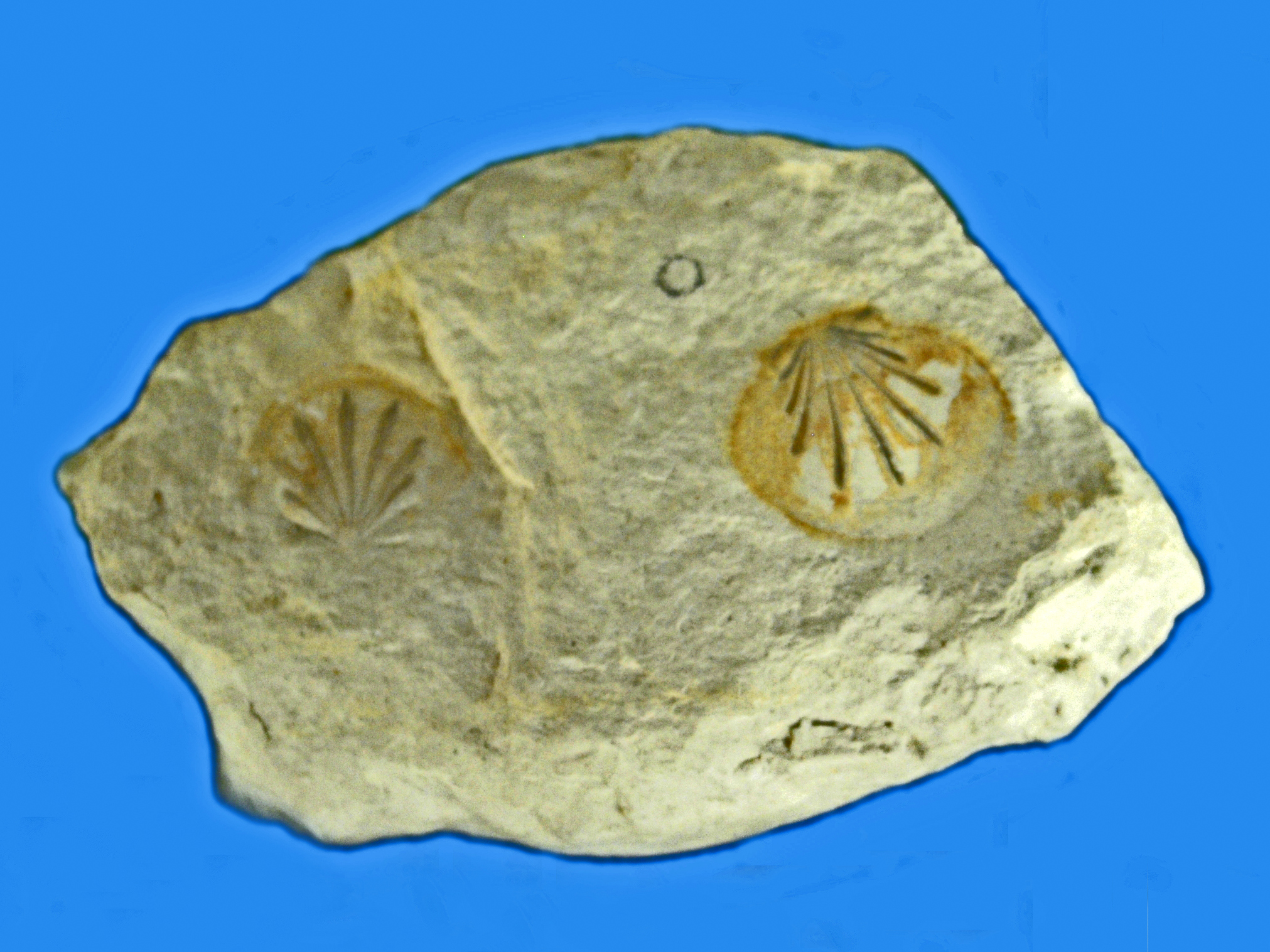
- Fossilized shells of the Triassic-modern marine bivalve Propeamussium
  Propeamussium
  - †Propeamussium alabamense
- †Prosigmodon
- †Prosimnia
  - †Prosimnia naviculae
- †Prosthennops
  - †Prosthennops serus
  - †Prosthennops xiphodonticus
- †Prosynthetoceras
  - †Prosynthetoceras francisi – type locality for species
  - †Prosynthetoceras orthrionanus – type locality for species
  - †Prosynthetoceras texanus – type locality for species
- †Proterixoides
- †Prothryptacodon
- †Protictis
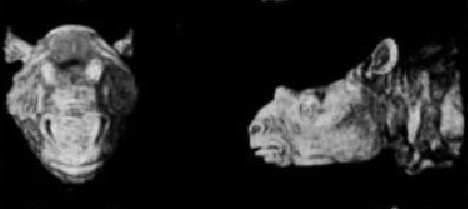
- Restorative models in multiple views of the Eocene brontothere Protitanotherium (figure 3)
  †Protitanotherium
  - †Protitanotherium emarginatum
- †Protoceras – tentative report
- †Protocitta
  - †Protocitta ajax – type locality for species
- †Protohippus
  - †Protohippus gidleyi
  - †Protohippus perditus
  - †Protohippus supremus – type locality for species
  - †Protohippus vetus
- †Protolabis
  - †Protolabis coartatus
- †Protoreodon
  - †Protoreodon parvus
  - †Protoreodon petersoni
  - †Protoreodon pumilus
- †Protosciurus
- †Protoscutella
  - †Protoscutella mississippiensis
- †Protoselene – or unidentified comparable form
- †Protospermophilus
  - †Protospermophilus quatalensis
- †Protosurcula
  - †Protosurcula aurora – type locality for species
  - †Protosurcula gabbii
  - †Protosurcula tenuirostris
- †Protylopus – tentative report
- Pseudacris
  - †Pseudacris clarki
  - †Pseudacris ocularis
  - †Pseudacris streckeri
- †Pseudaelurus – tentative report
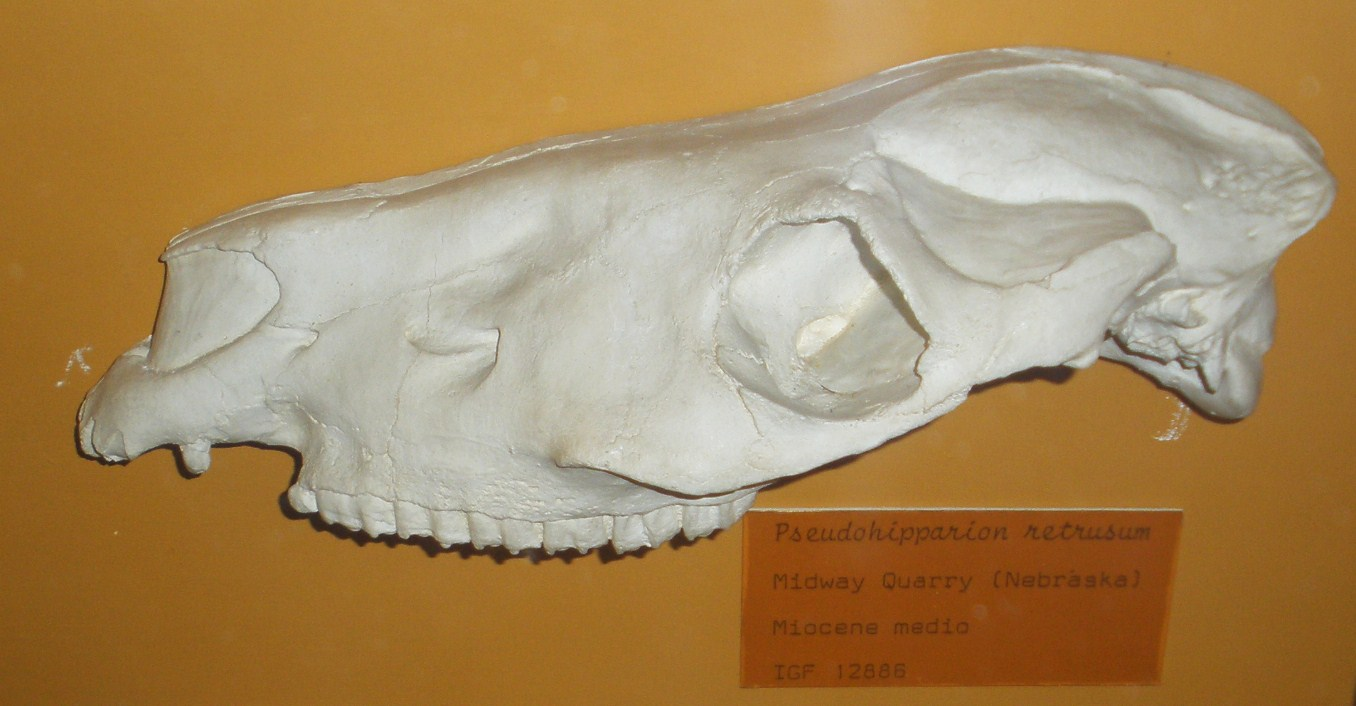
- Replica of a fossilized cranium of the Miocene horse Pseudhipparion
  †Pseudhipparion
  - †Pseudhipparion curtivallum
  - †Pseudhipparion hessei – type locality for species
  - †Pseudhipparion skinneri
- †Pseudoceras
  - †Pseudoceras skinneri
- Pseudochama
- †Pseudocylindrodon
  - †Pseudocylindrodon neglectus
  - †Pseudocylindrodon pintoensis – or unidentified related form
  - †Pseudocylindrodon texanus – type locality for species
- Pseudoliva
  - †Pseudoliva ostrarupis
  - †Pseudoliva santander
  - †Pseudoliva scalina
  - †Pseudoliva vetusta
- Pseudomalaxis
  - †Pseudomalaxis acuta – type locality for species
  - †Pseudomalaxis plummerae
  - †Pseudomalaxis reklawensis – type locality for species
  - †Pseudomalaxis texana
- †Pseudometula – type locality for genus
  - †Pseudometula gradus – type locality for species
- †Pseudoparablastomeryx
  - †Pseudoparablastomeryx scotti
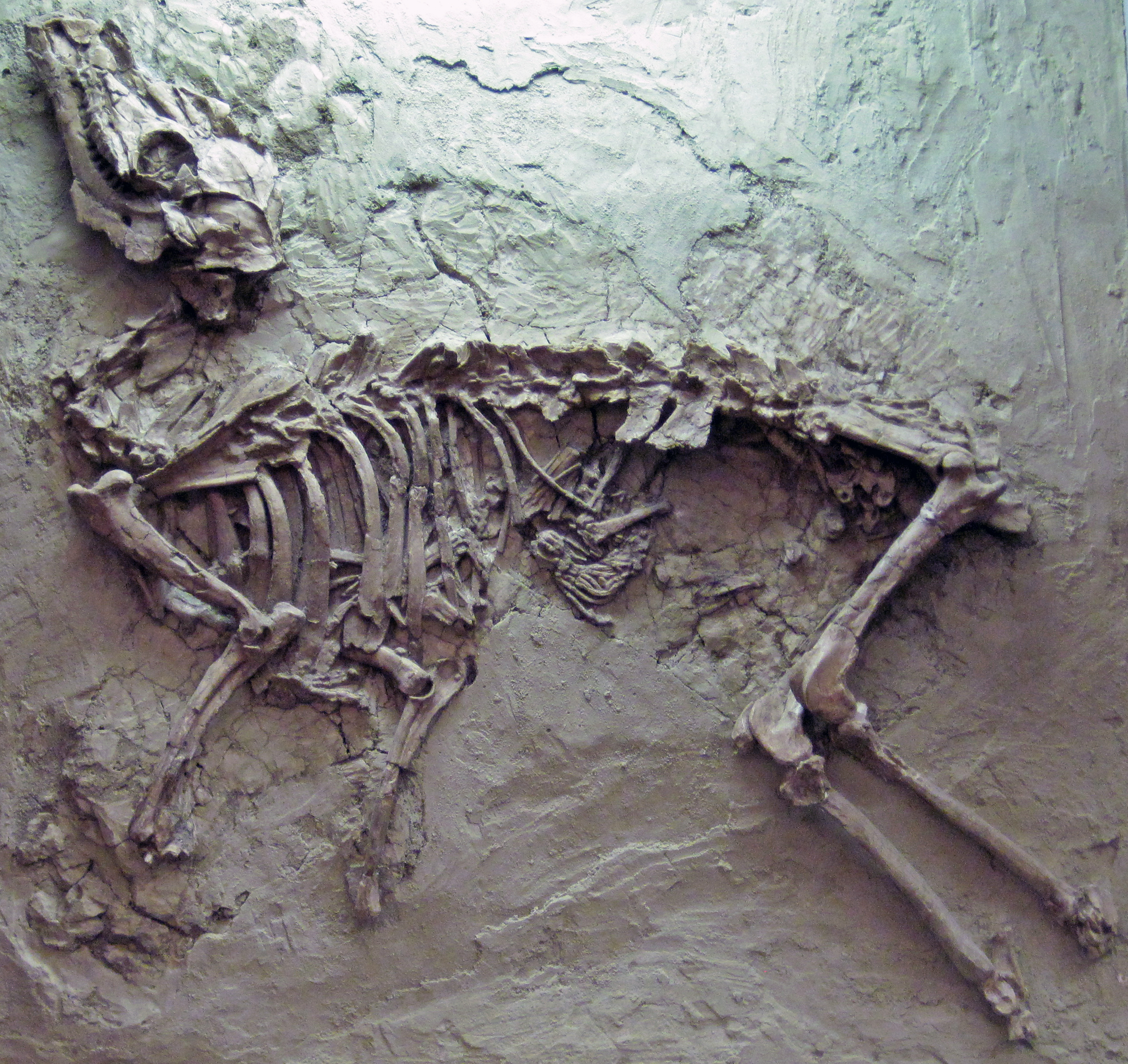
- Fossilized skeleton of the Eocene protoceratid mammal Pseudoprotoceras
  †Pseudoprotoceras
  - †Pseudoprotoceras minor
- †Pseudotheridomys
- †Pseudotomus
  - †Pseudotomus johanniculi
  - †Pseudotomus petersoni – or unidentified comparable form
- †Psittacotherium
  - †Psittacotherium multifragum
- Pteria
  - †Pteria deusseni
  - †Pteria limula
  - †Pteria petropolitana
- Pteris
  - †Pteris dentata
- †Pteropsella
  - †Pteropsella lapidosa
  - †Pteropsella praelapidosa
- †Pterosphenus
  - †Pterosphenus schucherti
- Pterothrissus
  - †Pterothrissus truncatus
- Pterynotus
  - †Pterynotus sabinola
  - †Pterynotus stenzeli – type locality for species
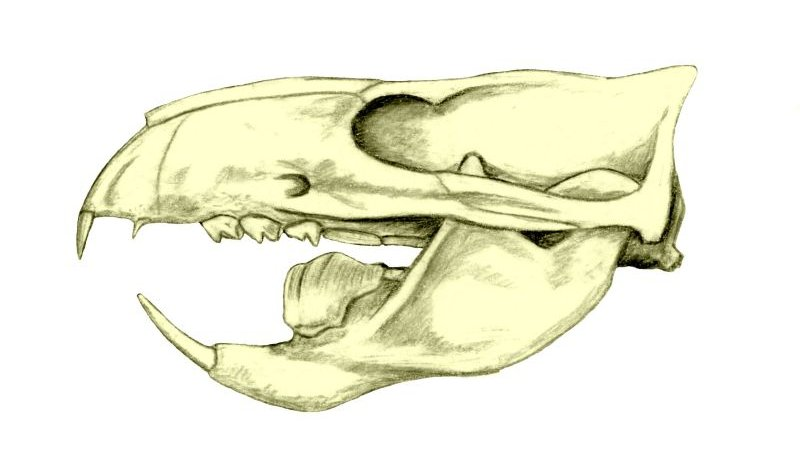
- Illustration of a fossilized skull of the Paleocene multituberculate mammal Ptilodus
  †Ptilodus
  - †Ptilodus mediaevus
- Ptinus
- Puma
  - †Puma concolor
- Pupilla
  - †Pupilla blandi
- Pupoides
  - †Pupoides albilabris
- Pycnodonte
  - †Pycnodonte sylvaerupis
- †Pylodictis
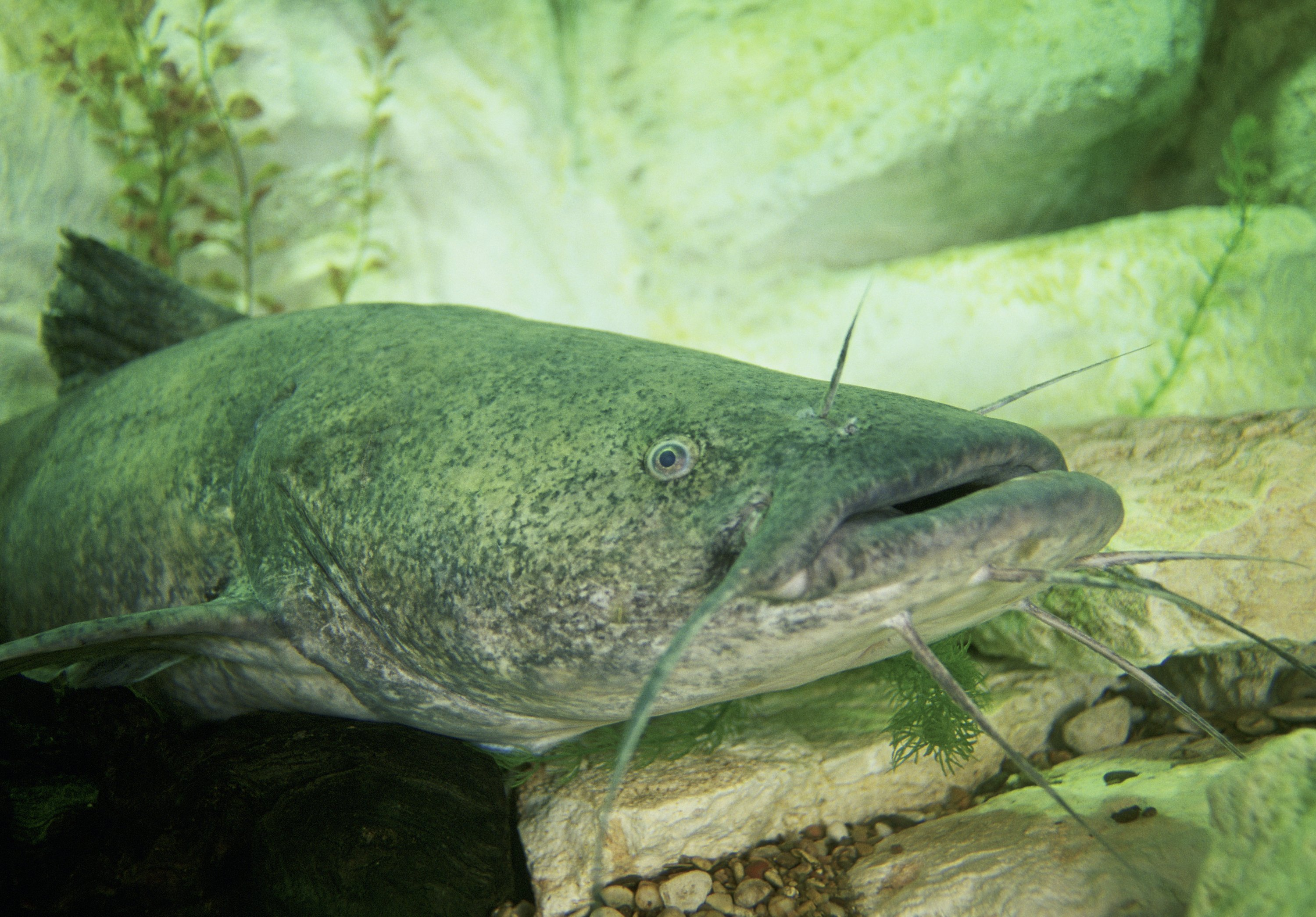
  - A living Pylodictis olivaris, or flathead catfish
    †Pylodictis olivaris
- Pyramidella
  - †Pyramidella bastropensis
  - †Pyramidella dalli
  - †Pyramidella filamentosa – type locality for species
  - †Pyramidella perexilis
  - †Pyramidella pirum – type locality for species
  - †Pyramidella propeacicula
  - †Pyramidella pseudopymaea
  - †Pyramidella tundrae – type locality for species
- †Pyramimitra
  - †Pyramimitra eocenica – type locality for species
  - †Pyramimitra terebraeformis
- †Pyricythereis
  - †Pyricythereis alabamensis
  - †Pyricythereis delicata – type locality for species
  - †Pyricythereis foveovalva – type locality for species
  - †Pyricythereis seminuda – type locality for species
  - †Pyricythereis smithvillensis – type locality for species
  - †Pyricythereis subtriangularis – type locality for species

== Q ==
- †Quadratomus
  - †Quadratomus gigans
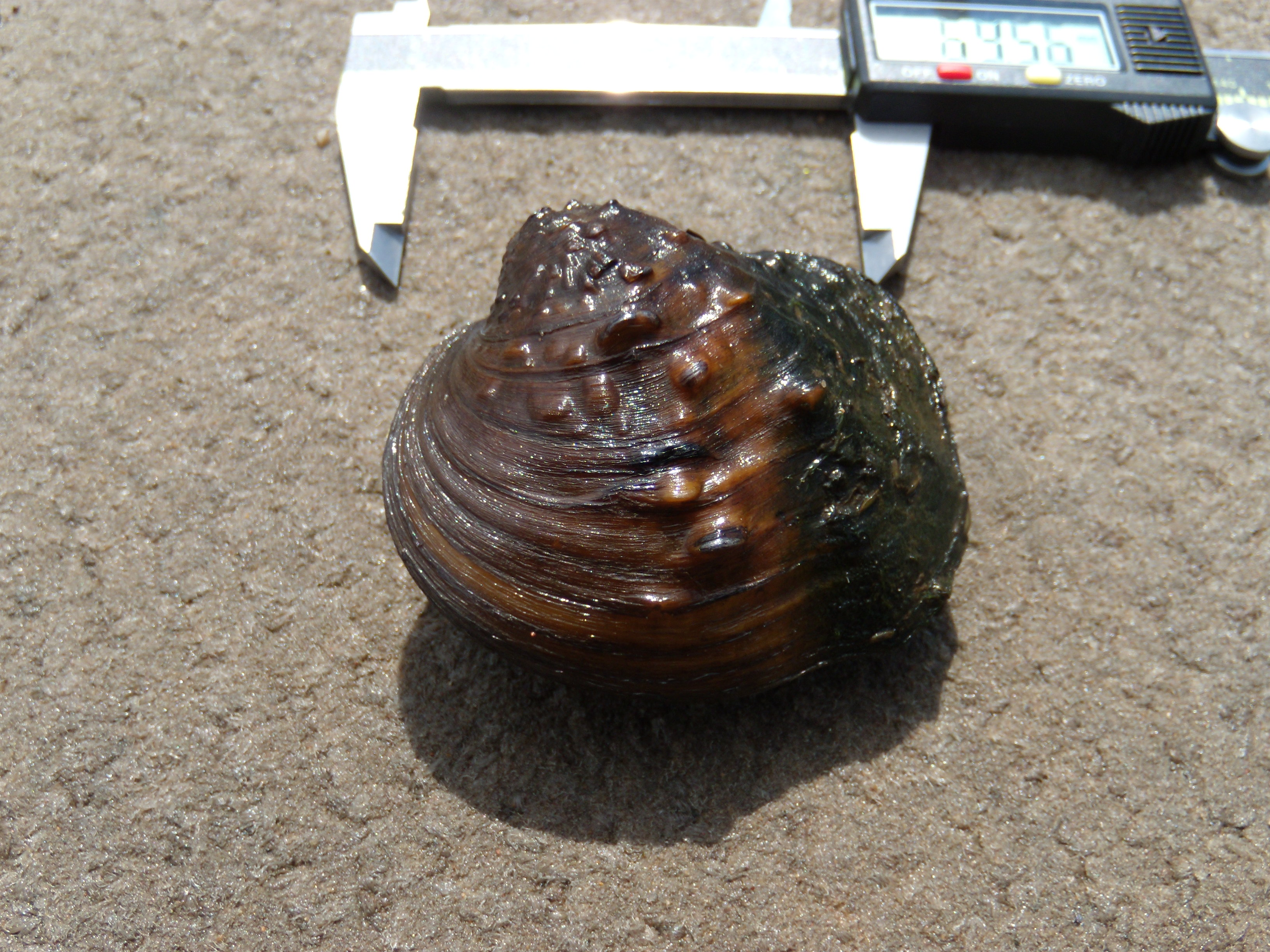
- A living Quadrula freshwater mussel
  †Quadrula
  - †Quadrula frustulosa
  - †Quadrula speciosa
- Quinqueloculina
  - †Quinqueloculina claiborniana
  - †Quinqueloculina seminulum
  - †Quinqueloculina vulgaris

== R ==
- Raja
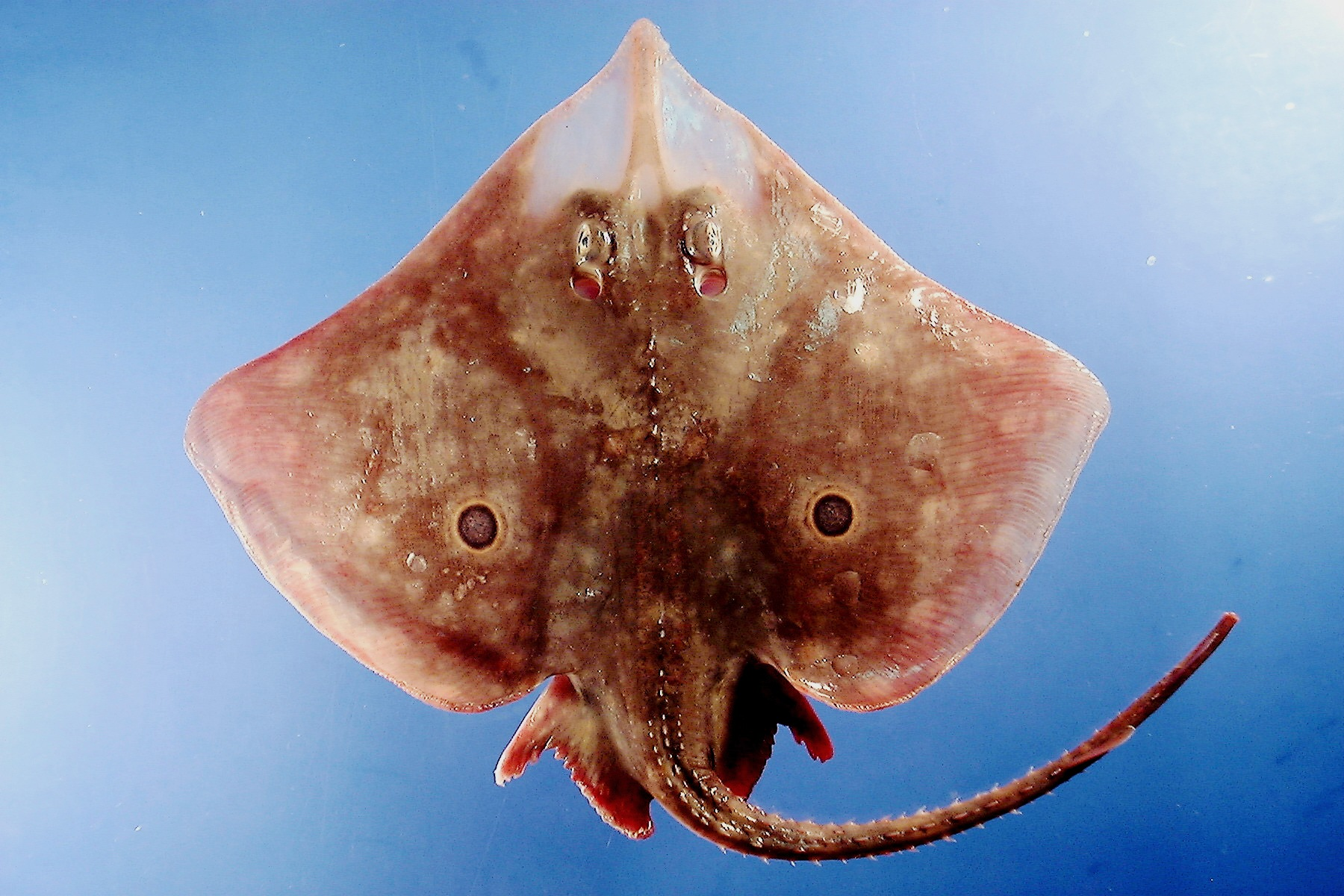
  - A living Raja texana also known as a roundel skate or Texas clearnose skate
    †Raja texana – type locality for species
- †Rana
  - †Rana catesbiana – lapsus calami of Rana catesbeiana
  - †Rana pipiens
- Ranularia
  - †Ranularia hula
- Raphitoma
  - †Raphitoma bastropensis – type locality for species
  - †Raphitoma bellula
  - †Raphitoma fannae
  - †Raphitoma georgei – type locality for species
  - †Raphitoma iuventae – type locality for species
  - †Raphitoma rebecella
  - †Raphitoma sabinia
  - †Raphitoma specus
- Reithrodontomys
  - †Reithrodontomys fulvescens
  - †Reithrodontomys megalotis
  - †Reithrodontomys montanus
  - †Reithrodontomys moorei
  - †Reithrodontomys rexroadensis – or unidentified comparable form
- †Retinella
  - †Retinella indentata
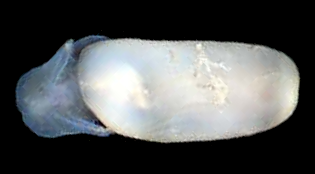
- A living Retusa barrel bubble sea snail
  Retusa
  - †Retusa adamsi
  - †Retusa adamski – or unidentified comparable form
  - †Retusa emoryi
  - †Retusa galba
  - †Retusa jacksonensis
  - †Retusa kellogii
  - †Retusa notata – type locality for species
  - †Retusa sylvaerupis
- †Rhabdopitaria
  - †Rhabdopitaria astartoides
  - †Rhabdopitaria pricei
  - †Rhabdopitaria texangelina
- Rhinobatos
- Rhinocheilus
  - †Rhinocheilus lecontei
- Rhinoptera
- Rhizorus
  - †Rhizorus conradianus
  - †Rhizorus loisae
  - †Rhizorus minutissimus
  - †Rhizorus smithvillensis
  - †Rhizorus volutatus
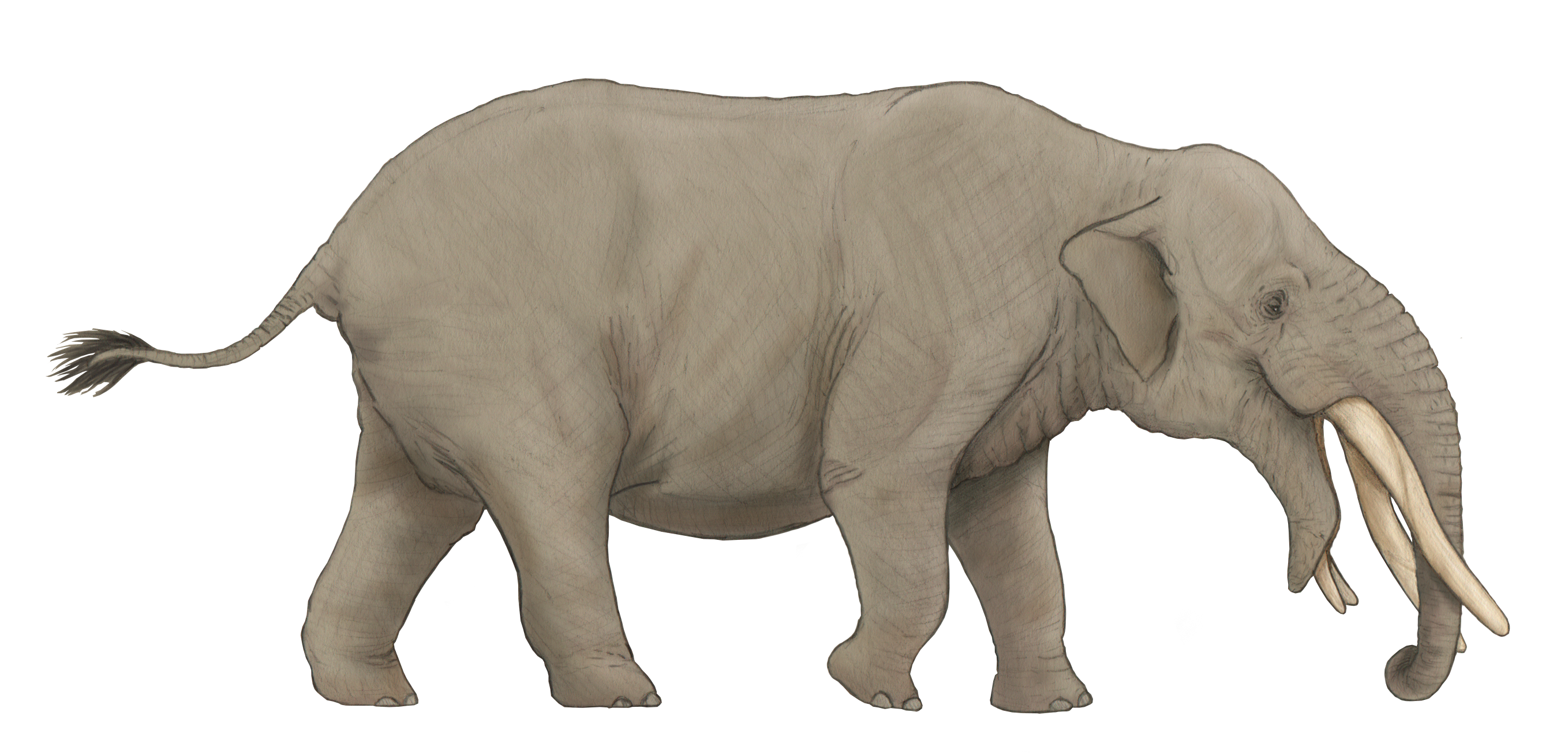
- Restoration of the Miocene-Pliocene elephant relative Rhynchotherium
  †Rhynchotherium – tentative report
- Rimella
  - †Rimella laqueatus
  - †Rimella texanum
- Ringicula
  - †Ringicula alabamensis
  - †Ringicula butleriana – tentative report
  - †Ringicula dubia
  - †Ringicula trapaquara
- †Rooneyia – type locality for genus
  - †Rooneyia viejaensis – type locality for species
- †Rotalia
  - †Rotalia beccarii
- †Rotularia
- †Rudiscala

== S ==
- Saccella
  - †Saccella atakta
- Salvadora
  - †Salvadora paleolineata
- †Sapindus
  - †Sapindus linearifolius
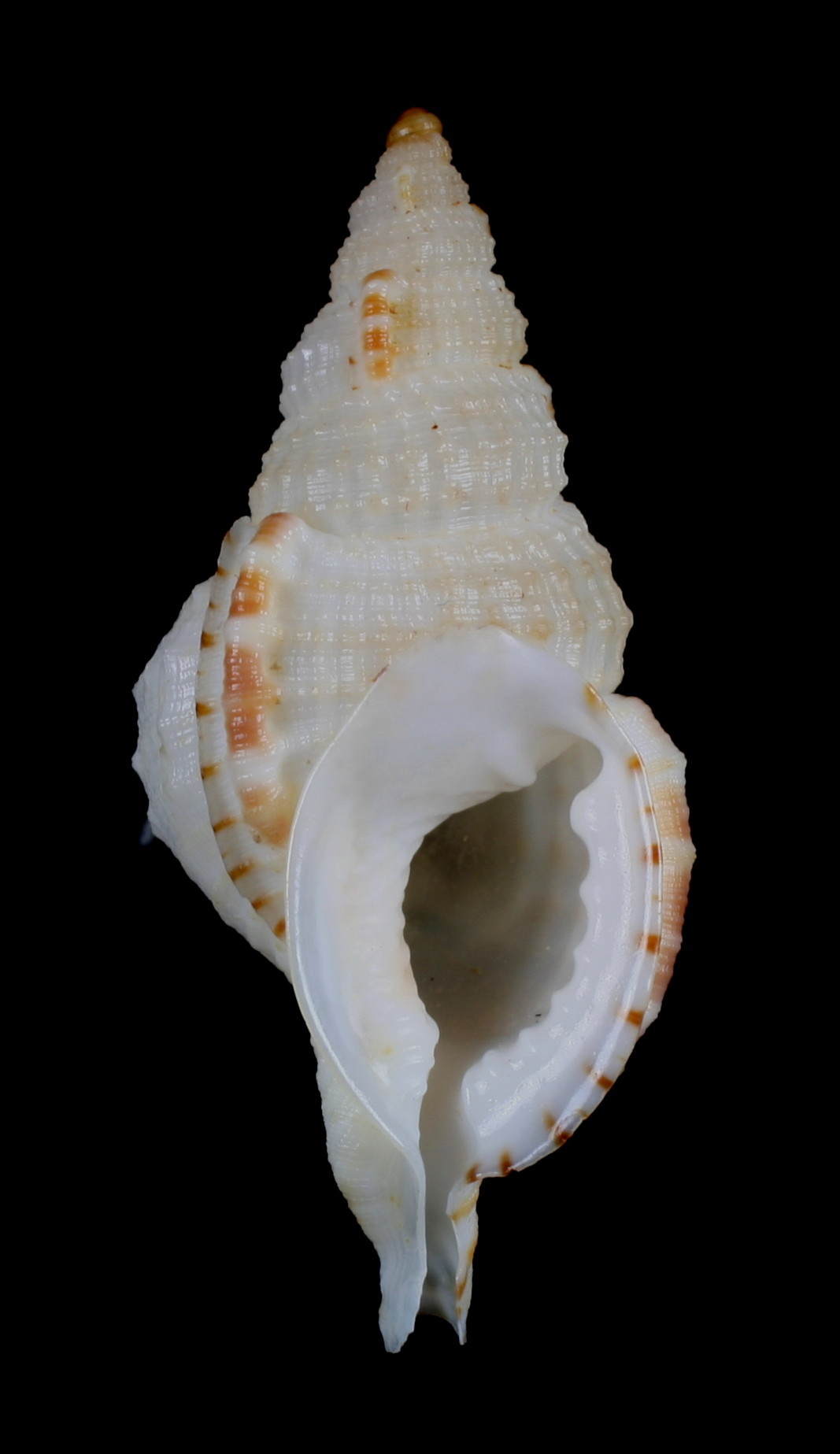
- Shell of a Sassia triton sea snail
  Sassia
  - †Sassia nucleoides – type locality for species
  - †Sassia septemdentata
  - †Sassia septendentata
- †Saxolucina
  - †Saxolucina claytonia
- Scalina
  - †Scalina dolosa
  - †Scalina trapaquara
- Scalopus
  - †Scalopus aquaticus
- Scaphander
- Scaphella
  - †Scaphella newcombiana
  - †Scaphella showalteri
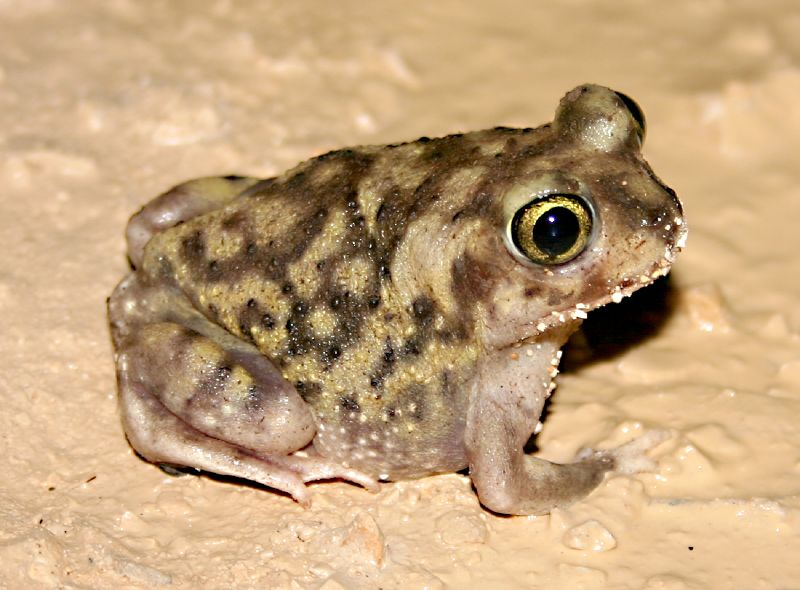
- A living Scaphiopus, or North American spadefoot toad
  Scaphiopus
- †Scaphites
- Sceloporus
  - †Sceloporus olivaceus
  - †Sceloporus undulatus
- †Scenopagus
  - †Scenopagus edenensis – or unidentified comparable form
- †Schedocardia
  - †Schedocardia hatchetigbeensis
- †Schizorthosecos
  - †Schizorthosecos interstitia
- Sciurus
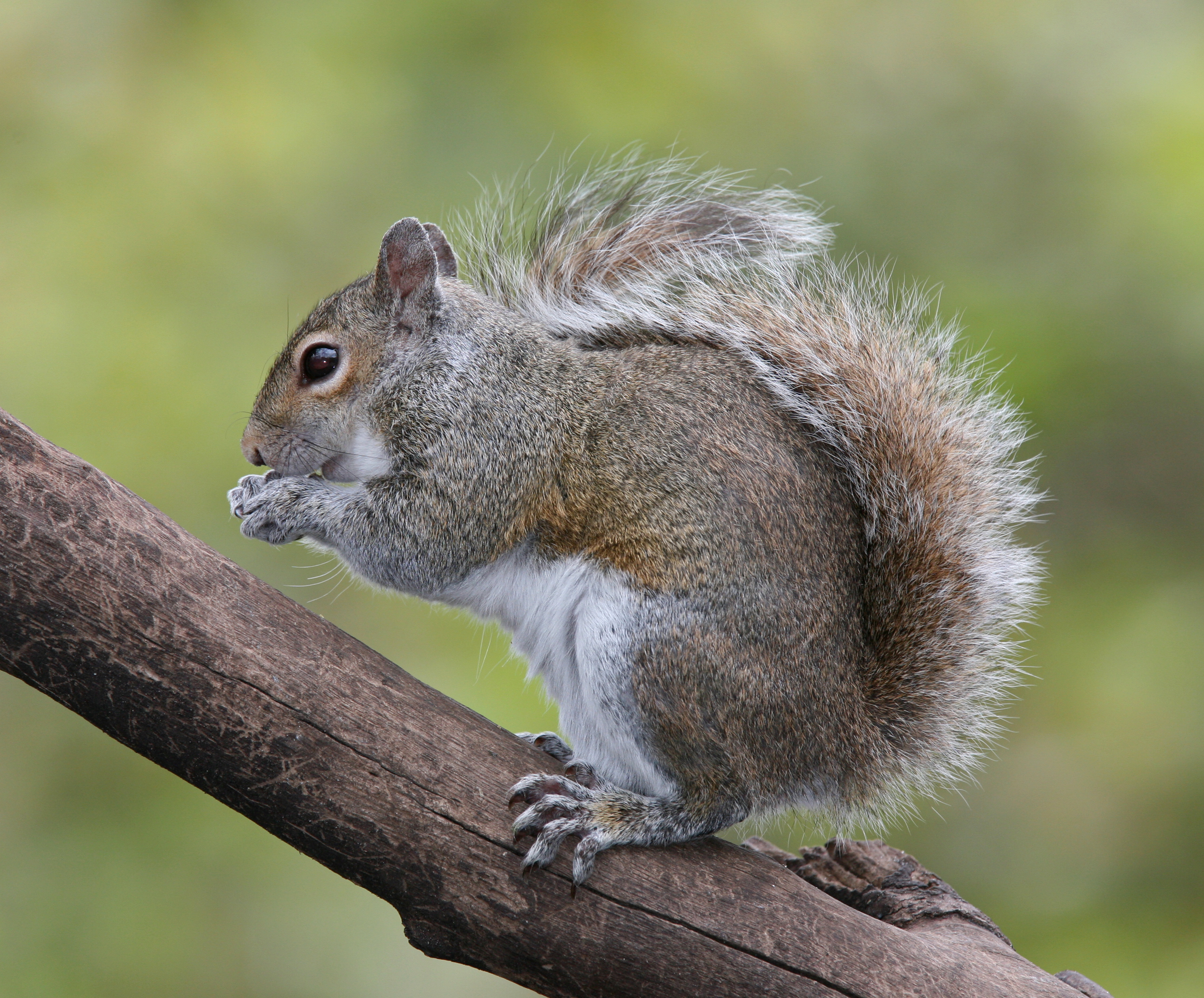
  - A living Sciurus carolinensis, or eastern gray squirrel
    †Sciurus carolinensis
  - †Sciurus niger
- Scobinella
  - †Scobinella reticulatoides
- †Selaginella
- Selenophorus – or unidentified comparable form
- Semele
  - †Semele australina
- †Semiactaeon
  - †Semiactaeon texanum – type locality for species
- †Septastrea
  - †Septastrea kerioides – type locality for species
- Serpulorbis
  - †Serpulorbis gonioides
  - †Serpulorbis multiclavus – type locality for species
- Sigatica
  - †Sigatica harrisi
- Sigmodon
  - †Sigmodon curtisi – or unidentified comparable form
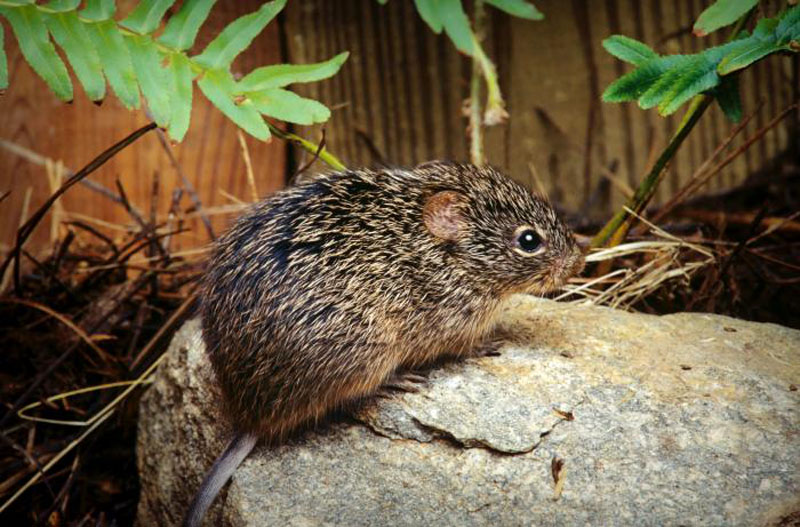
  - A living Sigmodon hispidus, or hispid cotton rat
    †Sigmodon hispidus
  - †Sigmodon hudspethensis – type locality for species
  - †Sigmodon minor
- †Signata – type locality for genus
  - †Signata nicoli – type locality for species
  - †Signata stenzeli – type locality for species
- Siliqua
  - †Siliqua simondsi
- †Simidectes
  - †Simidectes magnus
- †Similisciurus
  - †Similisciurus maxwelli – type locality for species
- †Simimys – or unidentified comparable form
- Simnia
  - †Simnia texana
- Sincola
  - †Sincola galvestonensis
- Sinodia
  - †Sinodia eocaenica
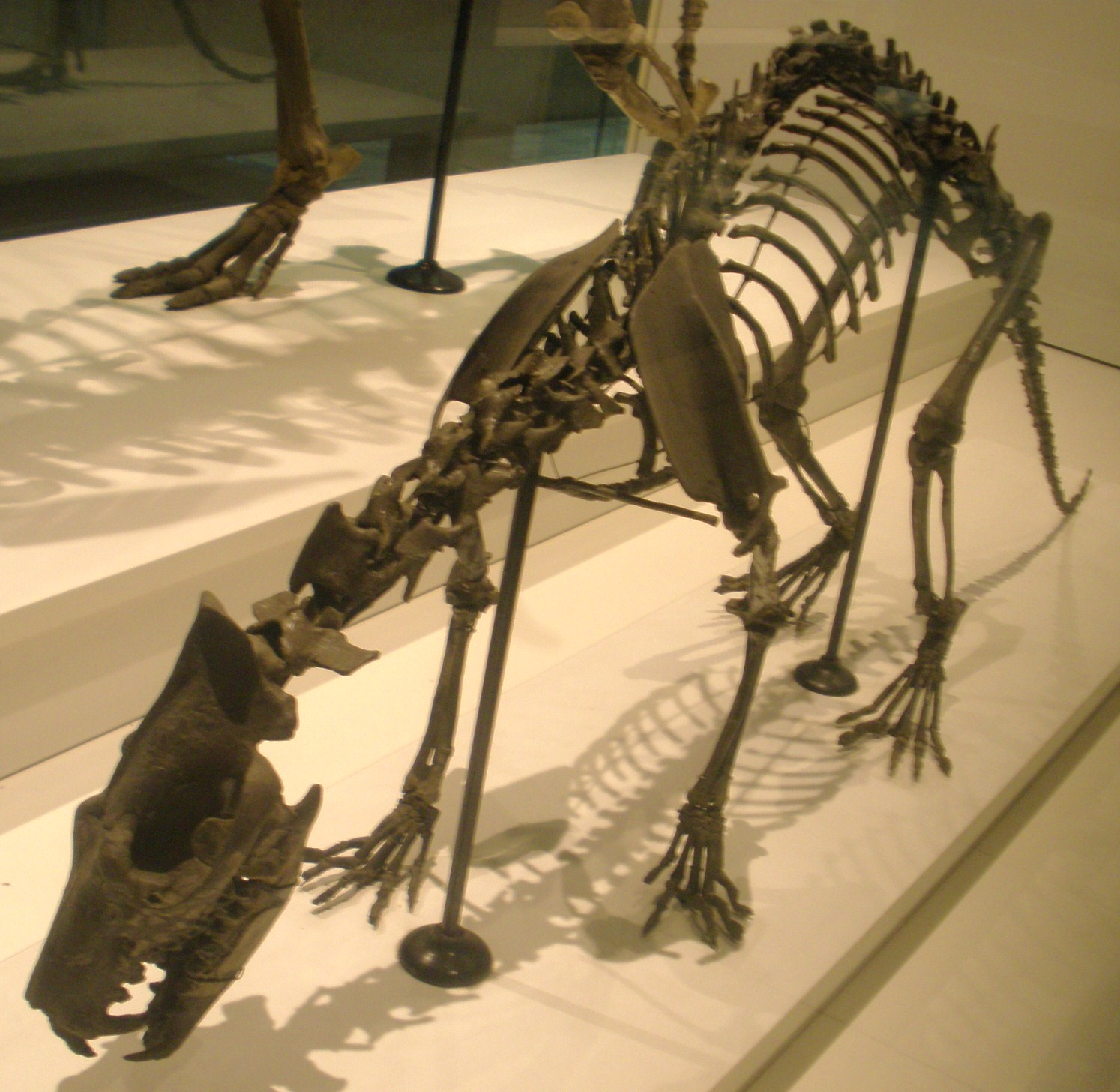
- Fossilized skeleton of the Eocene-Oligocene creodont mammal Sinopa
  †Sinopa
  - †Sinopa major
- Sinum
  - †Sinum arctatum
  - †Sinum bilix
  - †Sinum declive
  - †Sinum fiski – type locality for species
  - †Sinum inconstans
  - †Sinum moveum – type locality for species
  - †Sinum taylori – type locality for species
- Siphonalia
  - †Siphonalia newtonensis
  - †Siphonalia plummeri
- Siren
  - †Siren miotexana – type locality for species
- †Skaptotion
  - †Skaptotion reklawensis – type locality for species
- Skena
  - †Skena pignus
- Skenea
  - †Skenea dalli
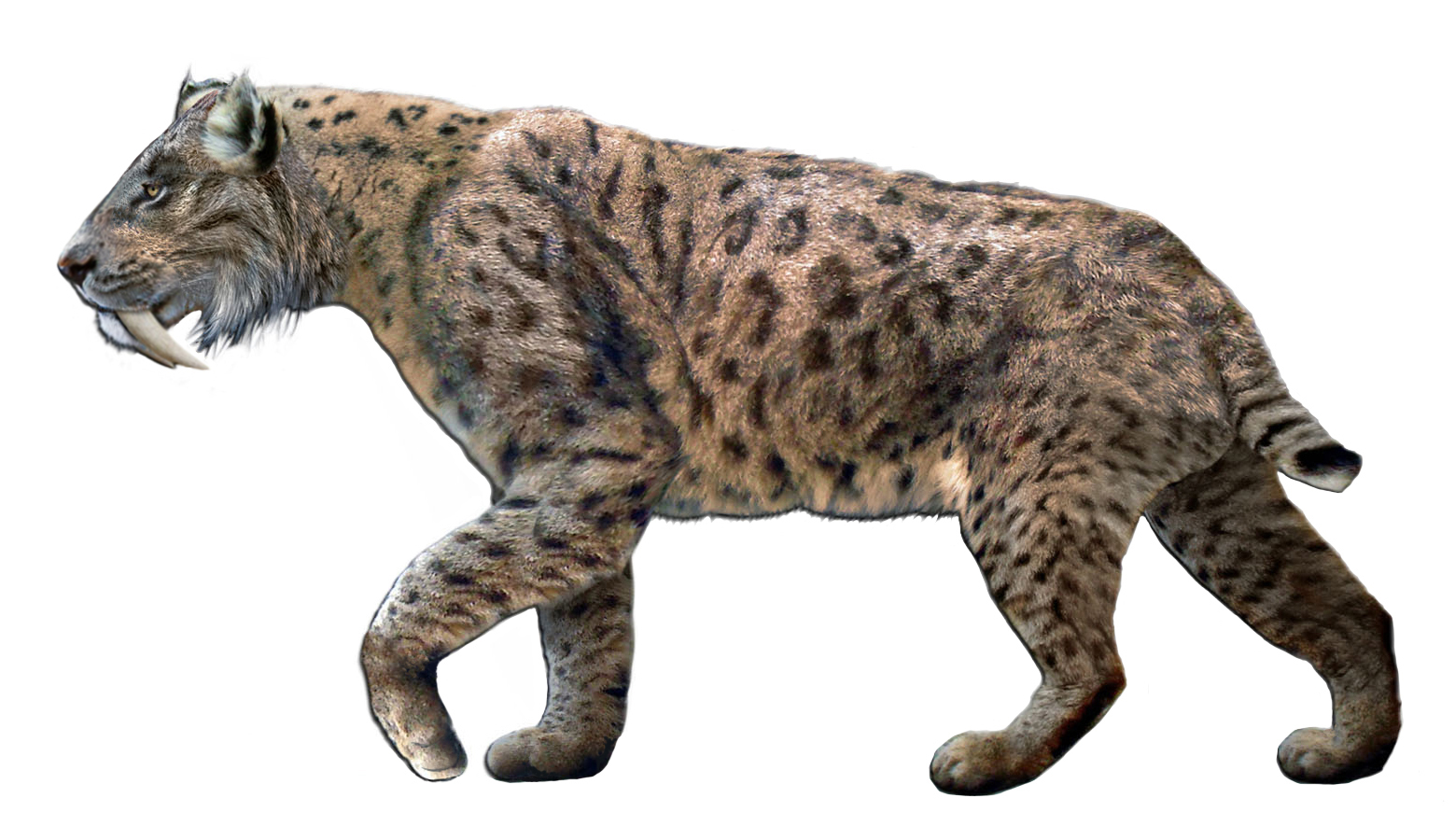
- Life restoration of the Pleistocene-Holocene saber-tooth cat Smilodon
  †Smilodon
  - †Smilodon fatalis
- †Soergelia
  - †Soergelia mayfieldi
- Solariella
  - †Solariella aldrichiana
  - †Solariella tricostata
- Solariorbis
  - †Solariorbis conicus – type locality for species
  - †Solariorbis discoides – type locality for species
  - †Solariorbis parsnaticoide – type locality for species
  - †Solariorbis parsnaticoides – type locality for species
  - †Solariorbis proius
  - †Solariorbis velarum – type locality for species
- †Solastella – type locality for genus
  - †Solastella cookei – type locality for species
- Solemya
  - †Solemya bilix
- Solen
  - †Solen pendletonensis
- Solena
  - †Solena shirleyi – type locality for species
- †Sophora
  - †Sophora wilcoxiana
- Sorex
  - †Sorex cinereus
  - †Sorex cudahyensis
  - †Sorex lacustris
  - †Sorex megapalustris
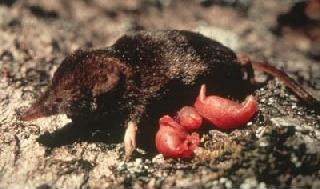
  - A living Sorex palustris, or American water shrew
    †Sorex palustris
  - †Sorex pratensis
  - †Sorex taylori
  - †Sorex vagrans
- Spermophilus
  - †Spermophilus elegans – or unidentified comparable form
  - †Spermophilus finlayensis
  - †Spermophilus howelli – or unidentified comparable form
  - †Spermophilus mcgheei
  - †Spermophilus spilosoma
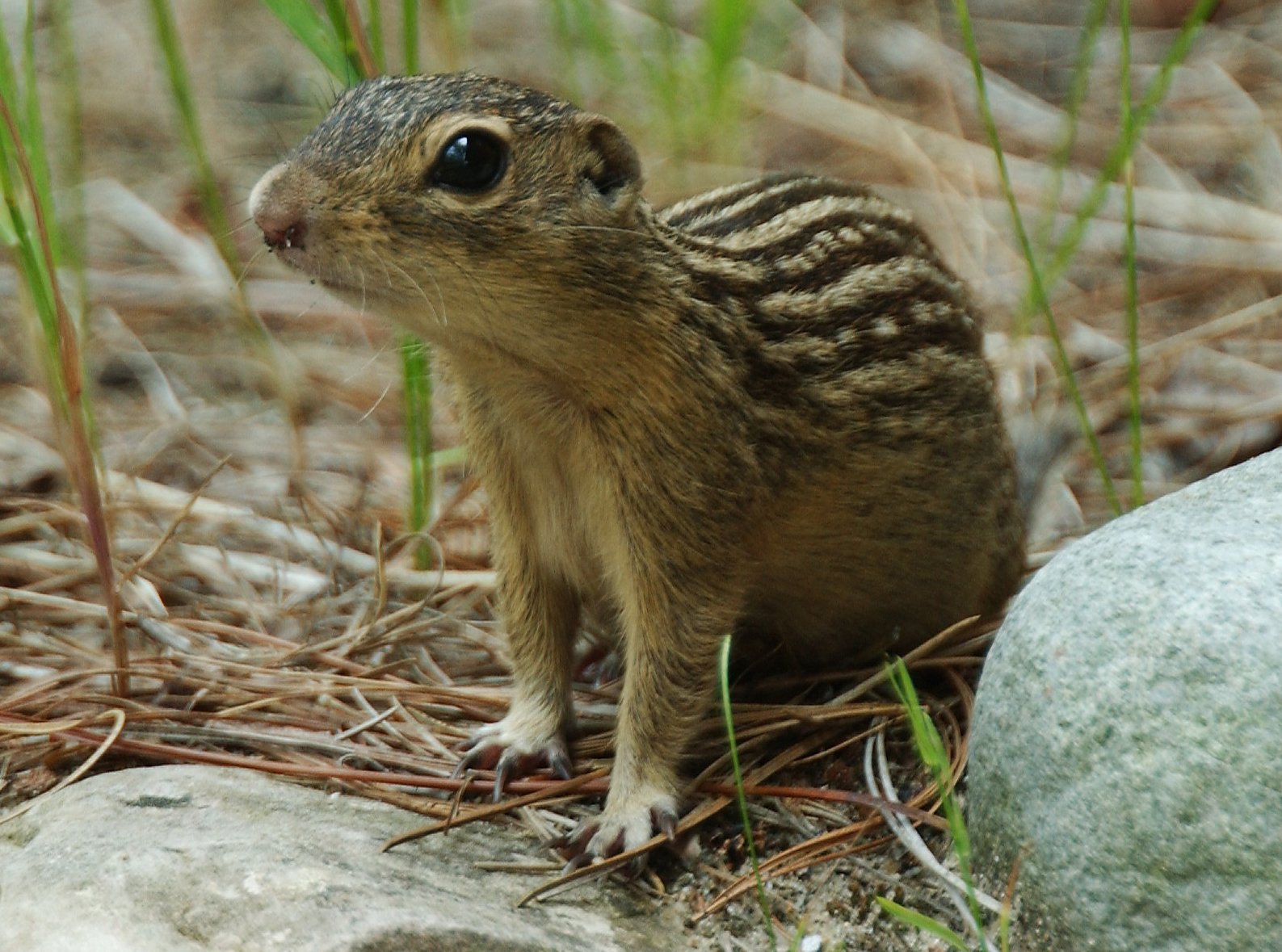
  - A living Ictidomys tridecemlineatus (formerly Spermophilus tridecemlineatus), or thirteen-lined ground squirrel
    †Spermophilus tridecemlineatus
  - †Spermophilus variegatus
- Sphaerium
  - †Sphaerium striatinum
- †Sphyreana
- Spilogale
  - †Spilogale microdens
  - †Spilogale putorius
  - †Spilogale rexroadi
- †Spinizoncolpites
  - †Spinizoncolpites prominatus
- Spirorbis
  - †Spirorbis leptostoma
- Spirotropis
  - †Spirotropis claibornica – type locality for species
- Spisula
  - †Spisula parilis
- Sportella – tentative report
  - †Sportella divaricata
- Stagnicola
  - †Stagnicola bulimoides
  - †Stagnicola exilis
  - †Stagnicola reflexa
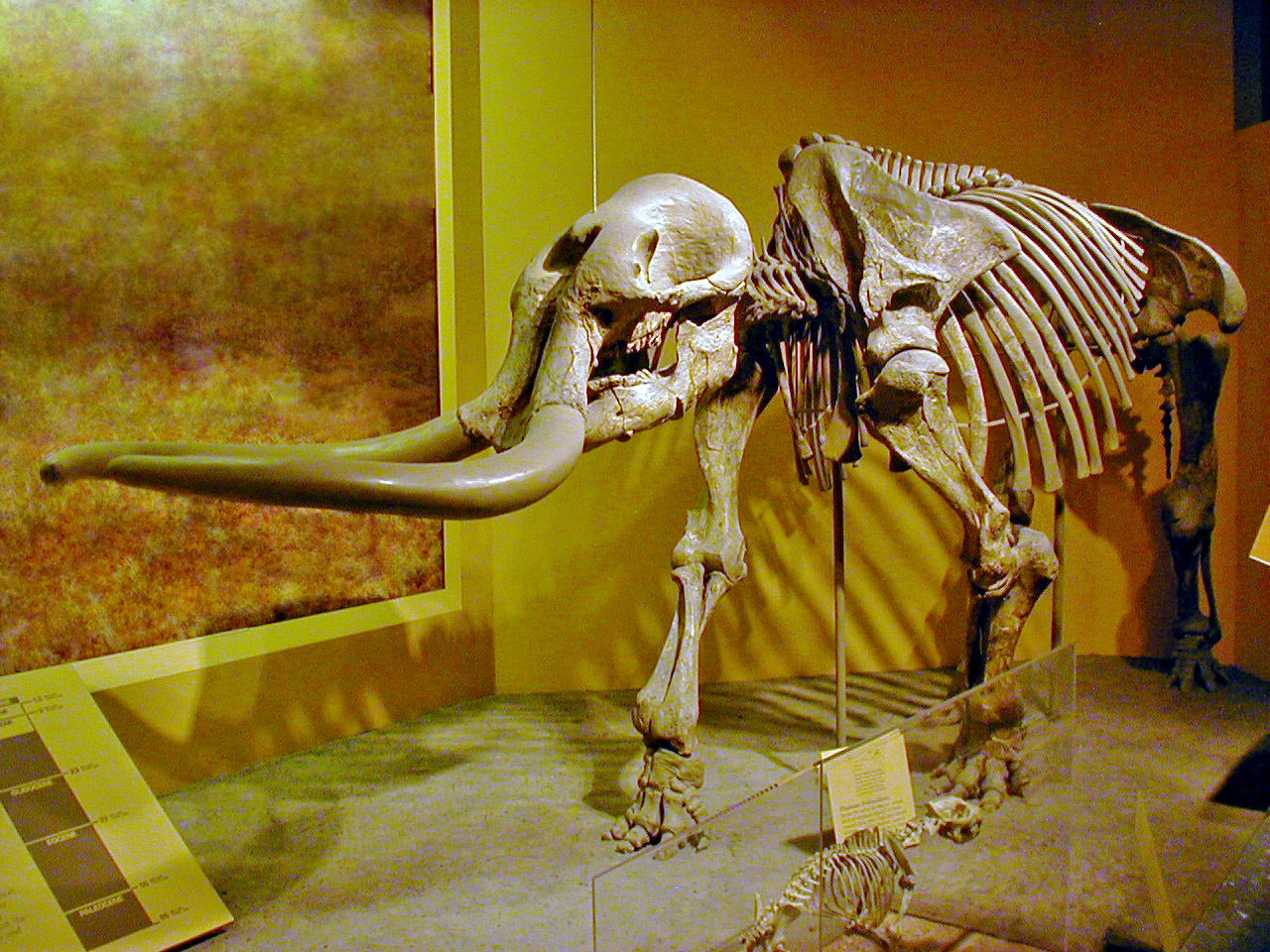
- Mounted fossilized skeleton of the Pliocene-Pleistocene elephant relative Stegomastodon
  †Stegomastodon
  - †Stegomastodon mirificus
- †Steneofiber
  - †Steneofiber barbouri – or unidentified comparable form
  - †Steneofiber fossor
  - †Steneofiber hesperus
- †Stenomylus
- †Stenotrema
  - †Stenotrema leai
  - †Stenotrema monodon
- Sternotherus
- Sthenictis
- †Stintonia
  - †Stintonia brazosia
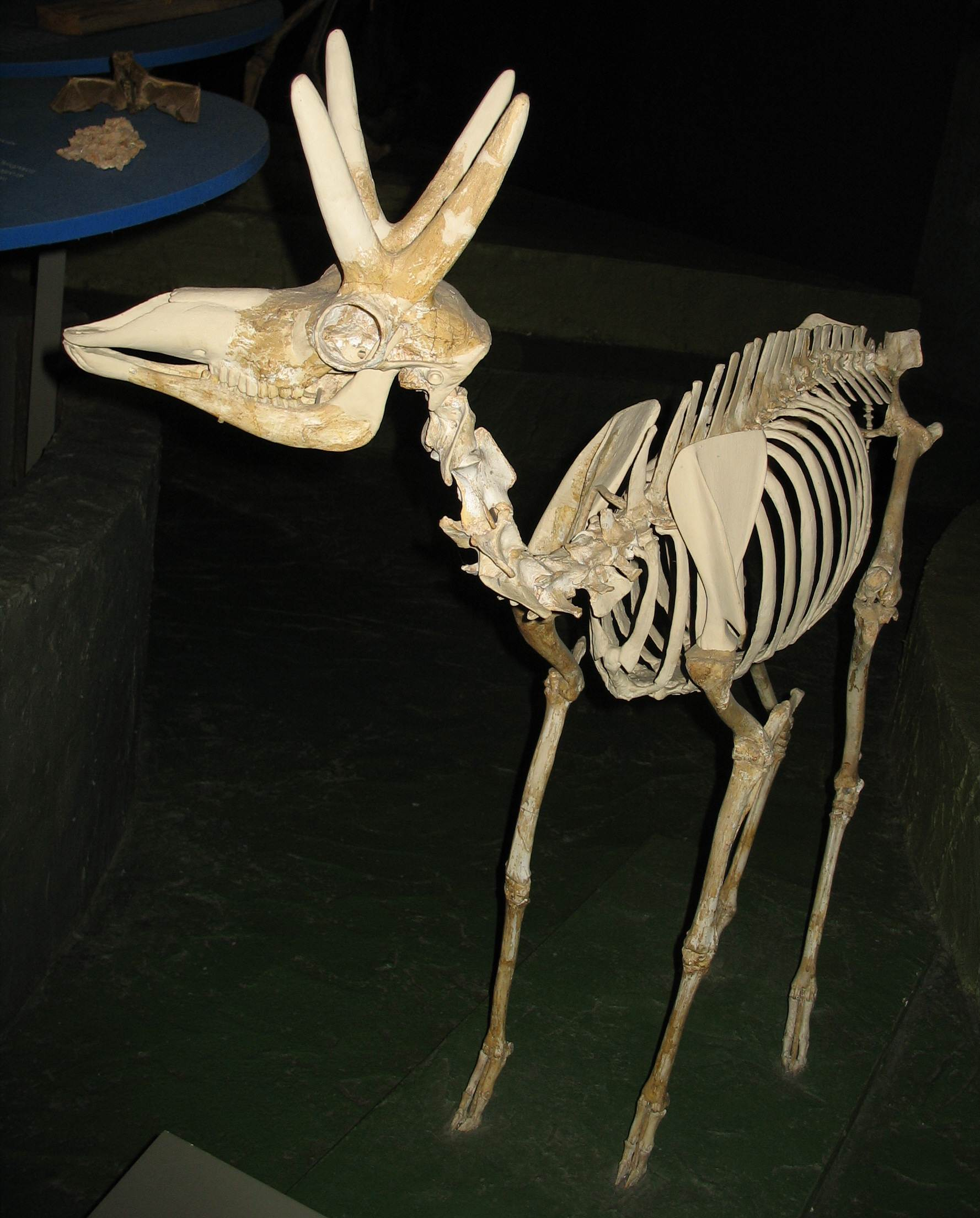
- Mounted fossilized skeleton of the fossil pronghorn Stockoceros
  †Stockoceros – or unidentified comparable form
- Storeria
  - †Storeria dekayi
- †Strepsidura
  - †Strepsidura contorea
  - †Strepsidura ficus
  - †Strepsidura harrisi – type locality for species
- Striarca
  - †Striarca stearnsii
  - †Striarca webbervillensis
- †Striatolamia
  - †Striatolamia macrota
- Strobilops
  - †Strobilops texasiana
- †Stygimys
  - †Stygimys vastus – type locality for species
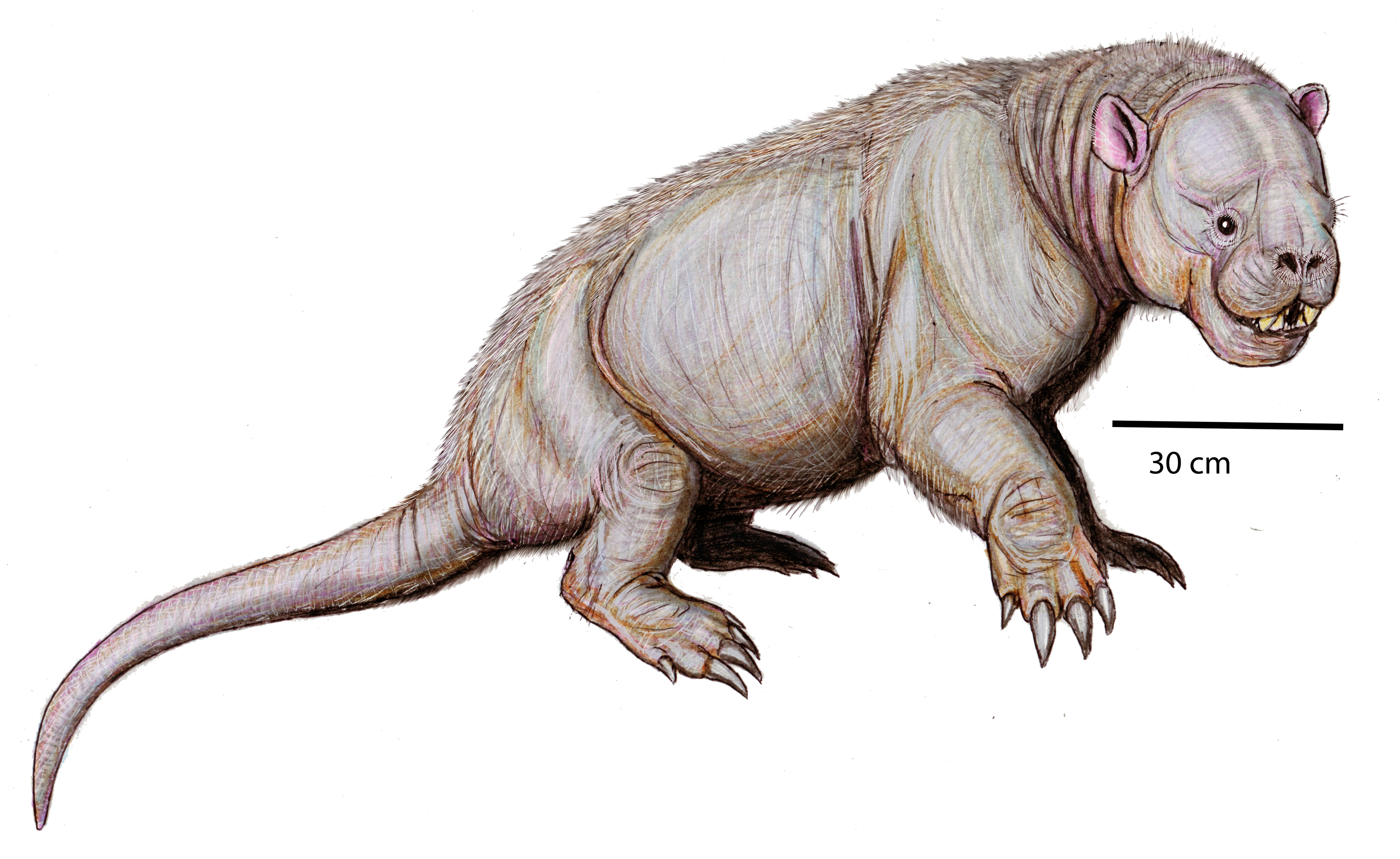
- Life restoration of the Eocene taeniodont mammal Stylinodon mirus
  †Stylinodon
- Succinea
  - †Succinea avara
- †Sulcocypraea
  - †Sulcocypraea kennedyi
- Surculites
  - †Surculites cabezai
  - †Surculites lapillus – type locality for species
- †Surculoma
  - †Surculoma dumblei
  - †Surculoma falsabenes
  - †Surculoma imbricata – type locality for species
  - †Surculoma kellogii
  - †Surculoma leoncola
  - †Surculoma penrosei
- †Sycostoma
  - †Sycostoma texana – type locality for species
- Sylvilagus
  - †Sylvilagus audubonii
  - †Sylvilagus floridanus
  - †Sylvilagus hibbardi
- †Symmetrodontomys
  - †Symmetrodontomys beckensis
  - †Symmetrodontomys simplicidens
- †Symplocos
  - †Symplocos amoena – type locality for species
  - †Symplocos fritschii – type locality for species
  - †Symplocos martinettoi – type locality for species
  - †Symplocos platycarpa – type locality for species
  - †Symplocos rothwelii – type locality for species
  - †Symplocos trinitiensis – type locality for species
  - †Symplocos trisulcata – type locality for species
- Synaptomys
  - †Synaptomys australis – or unidentified comparable form
  - †Synaptomys cooperi
- †Syncyclonema
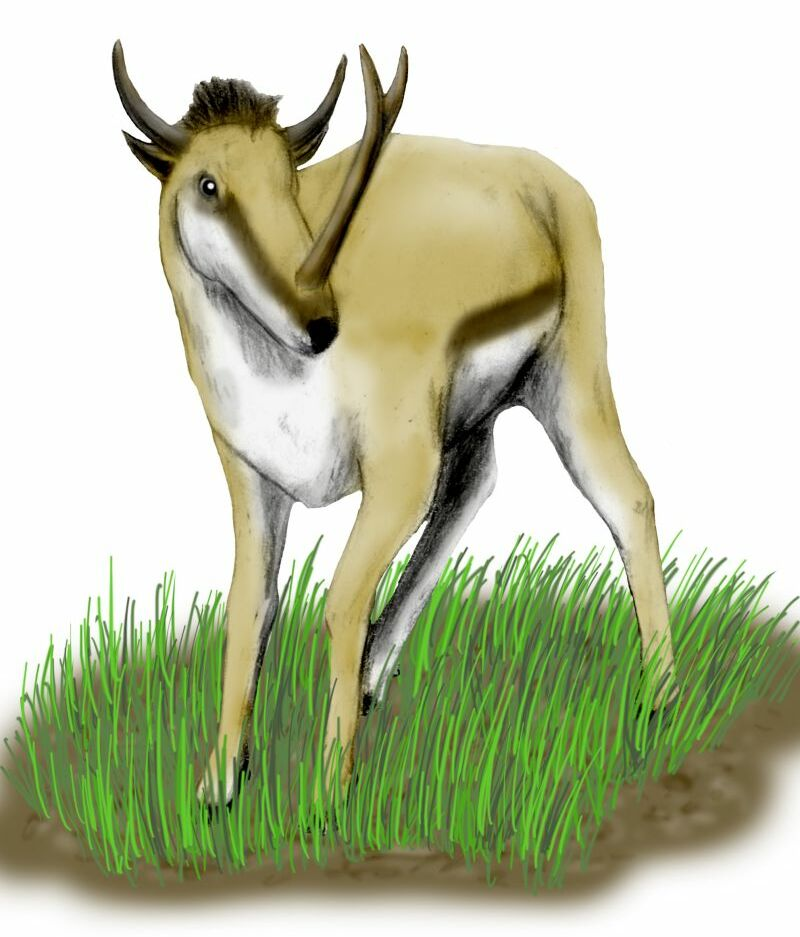
- Life restoration of the Miocene even-toed ungulate Synthetoceras
  †Synthetoceras
  - †Synthetoceras tricornatus – type locality for species
- Syrphus – or unidentified comparable form
- Syrrhophus
  - †Syrrhophus marnocki

== T ==
- Tantilla
- Tanytarsus – tentative report
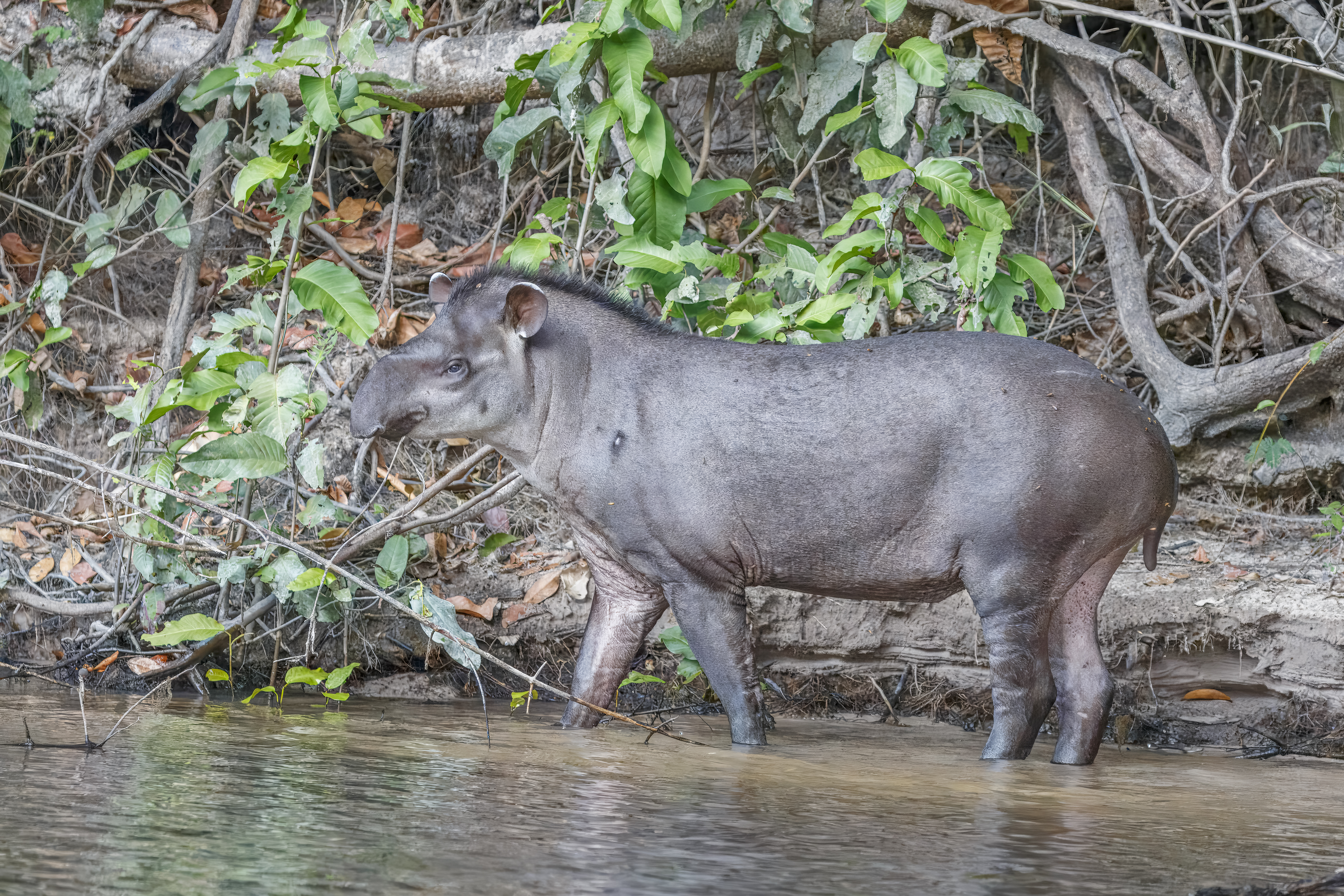
- A living Tapirus, or tapir
  Tapirus
  - †Tapirus haysii
  - †Tapirus veroensis
- Taxidea
  - †Taxidea taxus
- Teinostoma
  - †Teinostoma barryi – type locality for species
  - †Teinostoma eoa
  - †Teinostoma texanum
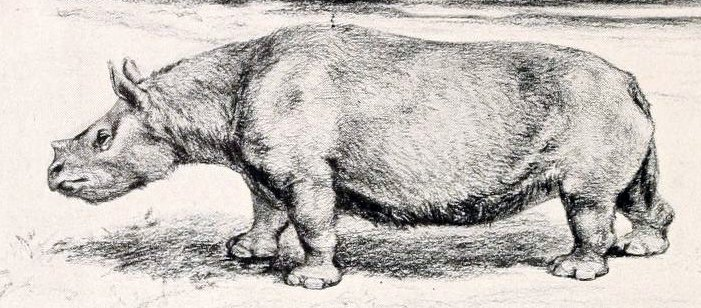
- Restoration of the Miocene-Pliocene rhinoceros Teleoceras
  †Teleoceras
  - †Teleoceras fossiger
  - †Teleoceras guymonense
  - †Teleoceras hicksi
  - †Teleoceras major
  - †Teleoceras medicornutum
  - †Teleoceras meridianum
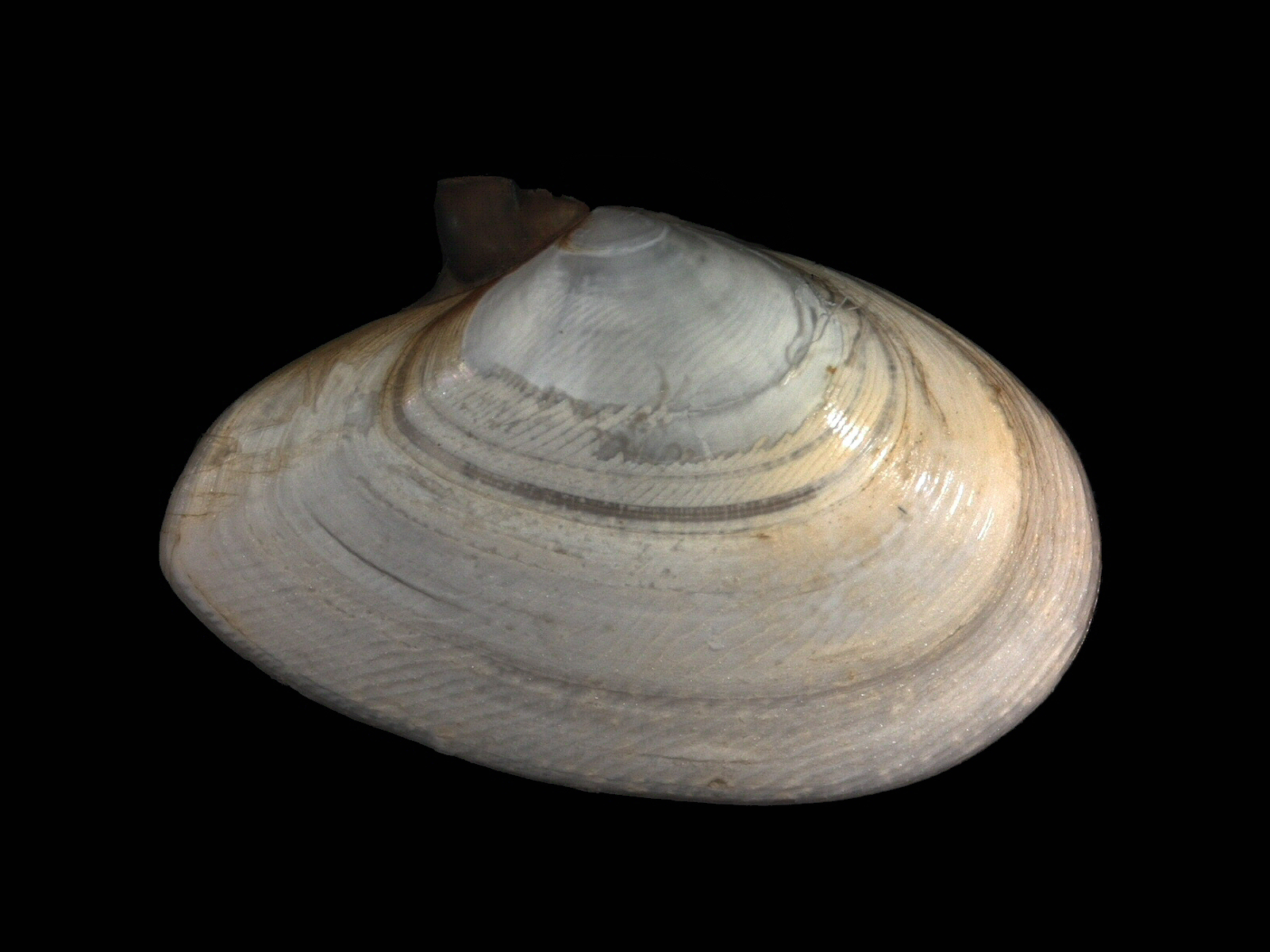
- Shell of a Tellina, or tellin
  Tellina
  - †Tellina cherokeensis
  - †Tellina leana
  - †Tellina makelloides
  - †Tellina petropolitana
  - †Tellina quihi
  - †Tellina santander
  - †Tellina semipapyra – or unidentified comparable form
  - †Tellina semipapyria
  - †Tellina tallicheti
  - †Tellina trumani
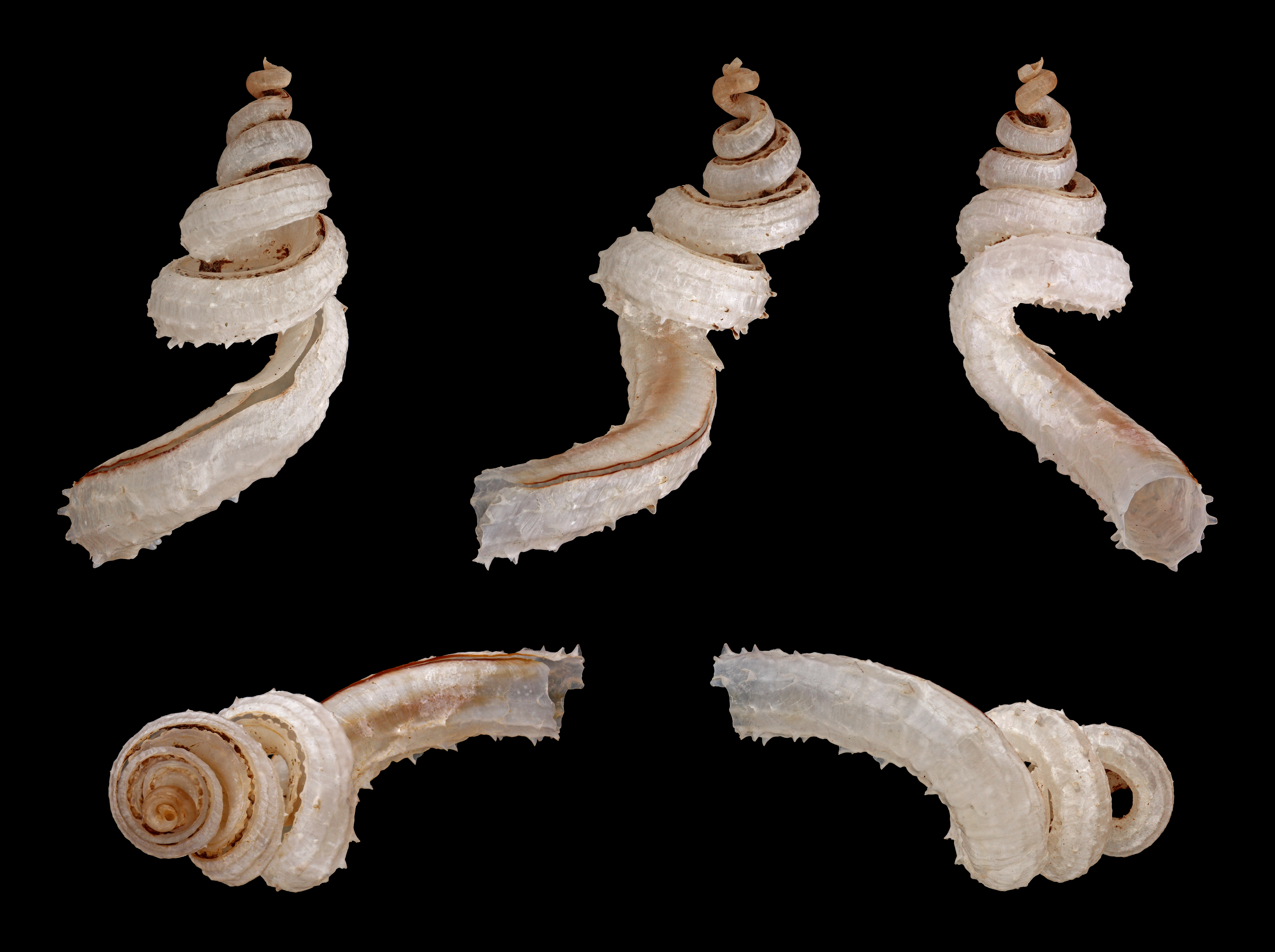
- Shell in multiple views of a Tenagodus sea snail
  Tenagodus
  - †Tenagodus texanus
- †Tenuimactra – type locality for genus
  - †Tenuimactra hodgkinsoni – type locality for species
- †Tephrocyon
  - †Tephrocyon scitulus
- Terebellum
- Terebra
  - †Terebra texagyra
- †Terebrifusus
  - †Terebrifusus amoenus
  - †Terebrifusus multiplicatus
- Teredo
  - †Teredo maverickensis
  - †Teredo ringens
- Terminalia
  - †Terminalia hilgardiana
- †Ternstroemites
  - †Ternstroemites preclaibornensis
- Terrapene
  - †Terrapene carolina
  - †Terrapene ornata
- Testudo
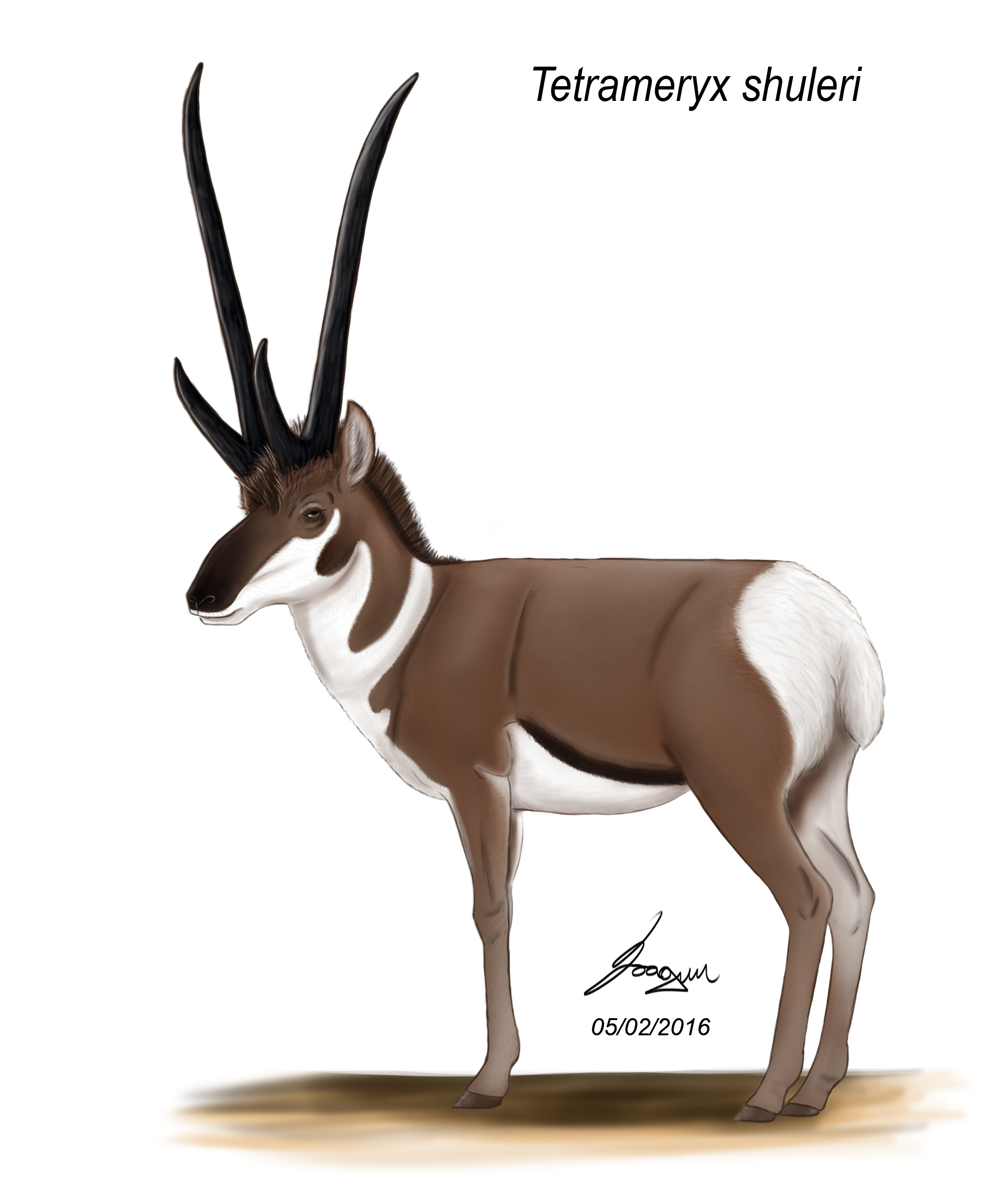
- Restoration of the Pleictocene pronghorn Tetrameryx
  †Tetrameryx
  - †Tetrameryx knoxensis
  - †Tetrameryx shuleri
- †Texasophis – type locality for genus
  - †Texasophis fossilis – type locality for species
- †Texmelanatria
  - †Texmelanatria angeloi
  - †Texmelanatria texana
- †Texoceros
  - †Texoceros altidens – type locality for species
- †Texodon
  - †Texodon meridianus – type locality for species
- †Texomys
  - †Texomys ritchiei – type locality for species
- Thamnophis
  - †Thamnophis proximus
  - †Thamnophis saurita
  - †Thamnophis sirtalis
- Theodoxus
  - †Theodoxus domicilium – type locality for species
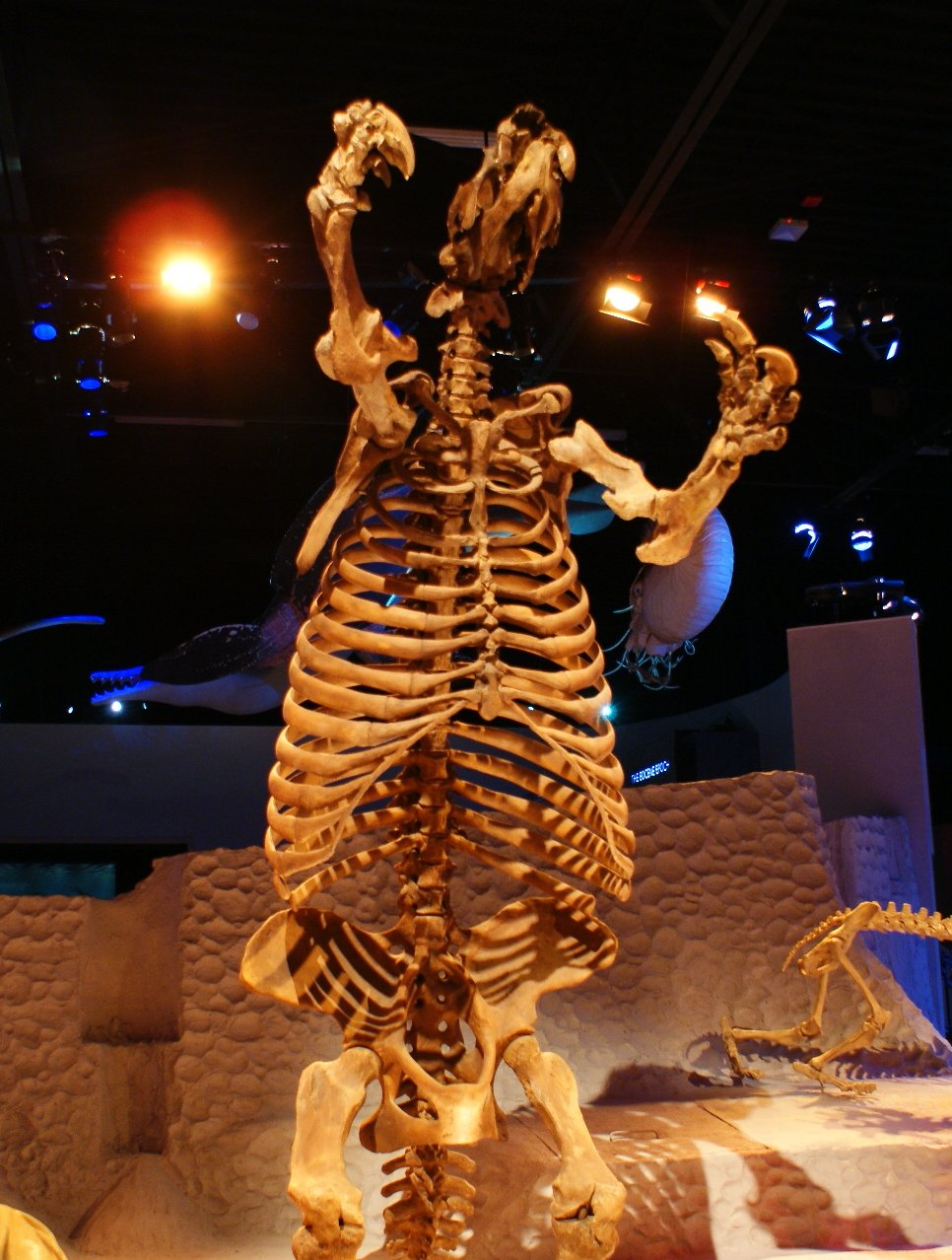
- Mounted fossilized skeleton of the Miocene-Pliocene ground sloth Thinobadistes
  †Thinobadistes
  - †Thinobadistes wetzeli
- †Thisbemys
  - †Thisbemys corrugatus
- Thomomys
  - †Thomomys bottae
  - †Thomomys talpoides – or unidentified comparable form
- †Tibiella – report made of unidentified related form or using admittedly obsolete nomenclature
  - †Tibiella texana
- †Tiburnus
  - †Tiburnus texanus
- †Ticholeptus
  - †Ticholeptus rileyi – type locality for species
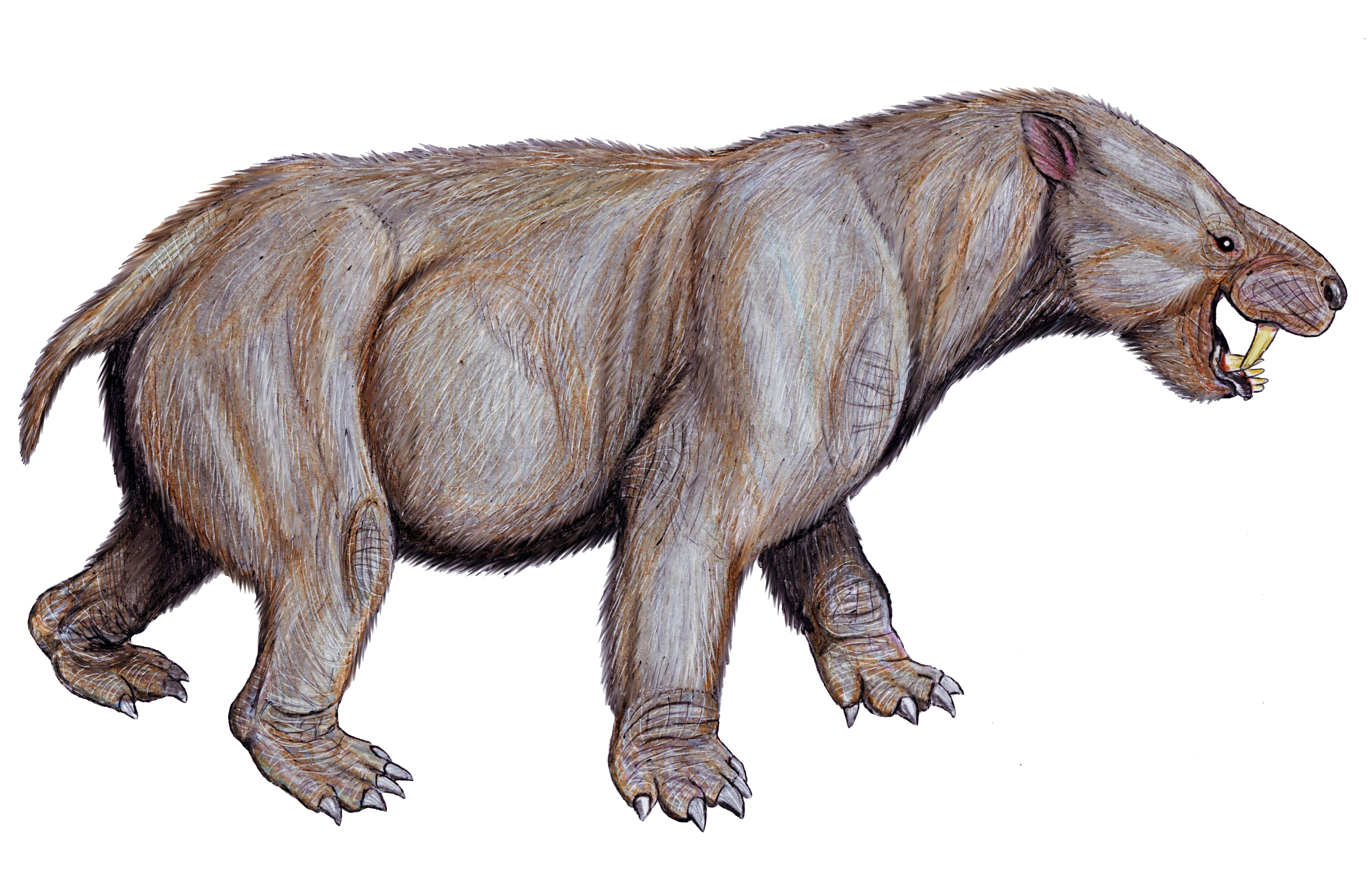
- Life restoration of the Paleocene pantodont mammal Titanoides
  †Titanoides
  - †Titanoides gidleyi – or unidentified comparable form
- †Tomarctus
  - †Tomarctus brevirostris
- †Tornatellaea
  - †Tornatellaea leai
  - †Tornatellaea quercollis – tentative report
  - †Tornatellaea texana
- †Tornatina – report made of unidentified related form or using admittedly obsolete nomenclature
  - †Tornatina angelinae
- †Toromeryx
  - †Toromeryx marginensis – type locality for species
- †Toxotherium
  - †Toxotherium hunteri
- †Transovula
  - †Transovula scobina – type locality for species
- †Trichiuris
- †Trigonias – tentative report
- †Trigonictis
  - †Trigonictis cookii
- Trigonostoma
  - †Trigonostoma babylonicum
  - †Trigonostoma elegantissima – type locality for species
  - †Trigonostoma gemmatum
  - †Trigonostoma harrisi
  - †Trigonostoma herbae – type locality for species
  - †Trigonostoma jonesae – type locality for species
  - †Trigonostoma panones
  - †Trigonostoma penrosei
  - †Trigonostoma sabinetownense
  - †Trigonostoma sabinetownensis – type locality for species
- Trigonulina
  - †Trigonulina satex
- †Trimalaxis – type locality for genus
  - †Trimalaxis ora – type locality for species
- †Trinacria
  - †Trinacria microcancellata – type locality for species
- †Tripia
  - †Tripia anteatripla – tentative report
- †Triplopus – tentative report
  - †Triplopus implicatus – or unidentified comparable form
- Trochita
  - †Trochita aperta
- Trochocyathus
  - †Trochocyathus coloradoensis – type locality for species
  - †Trochocyathus uber – type locality for species
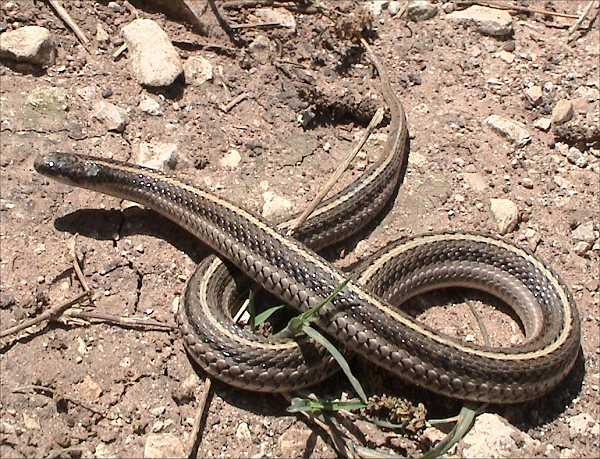
- A living Tropidoclonion, or lined snake
  Tropidoclonion
  - †Tropidoclonion lineatum
- †Tropisurcula
  - †Tropisurcula crenula – tentative report
  - †Tropisurcula grandis – type locality for species
  - †Tropisurcula milamensis – type locality for species
  - †Tropisurcula planus – type locality for species
- †Truncilla
  - †Truncilla truncata
- †Trygon
  - †Trygon alveolatus – type locality for species
- †Trypanotoma
  - †Trypanotoma longispira
  - †Trypanotoma terebriformis
- †Trypanotopsis
  - †Trypanotopsis texana
- †Tuba
  - †Tuba antiquata
- Tubiola
  - †Tubiola gracilis – type locality for species
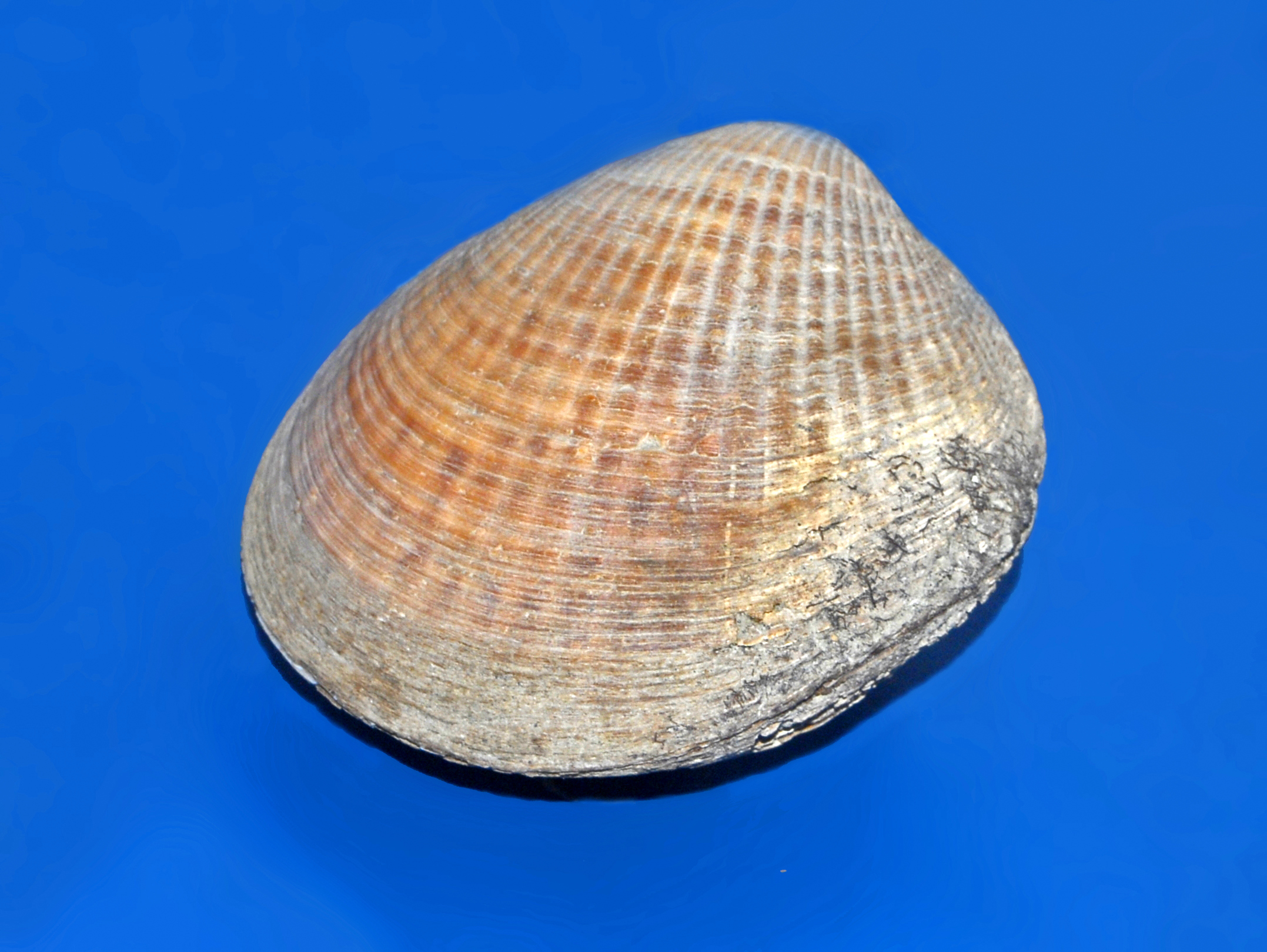
- Shell of a Tucetona bittersweet clam
  Tucetona
  - †Tucetona sabinensis
- †Turbinolia
  - †Turbinolia pharetra
  - †Turbinolia subtercisa – type locality for species
  - †Turbinolia tenuis
- Turboella
- Turbonilla
  - †Turbonilla clinensis
  - †Turbonilla meta – type locality for species
  - †Turbonilla neglecta – type locality for species
- Turpinia
  - †Turpinia tiffneyi – type locality for species
- Turricula
  - †Turricula floweri
  - †Turricula nasuta
  - †Turricula plenta
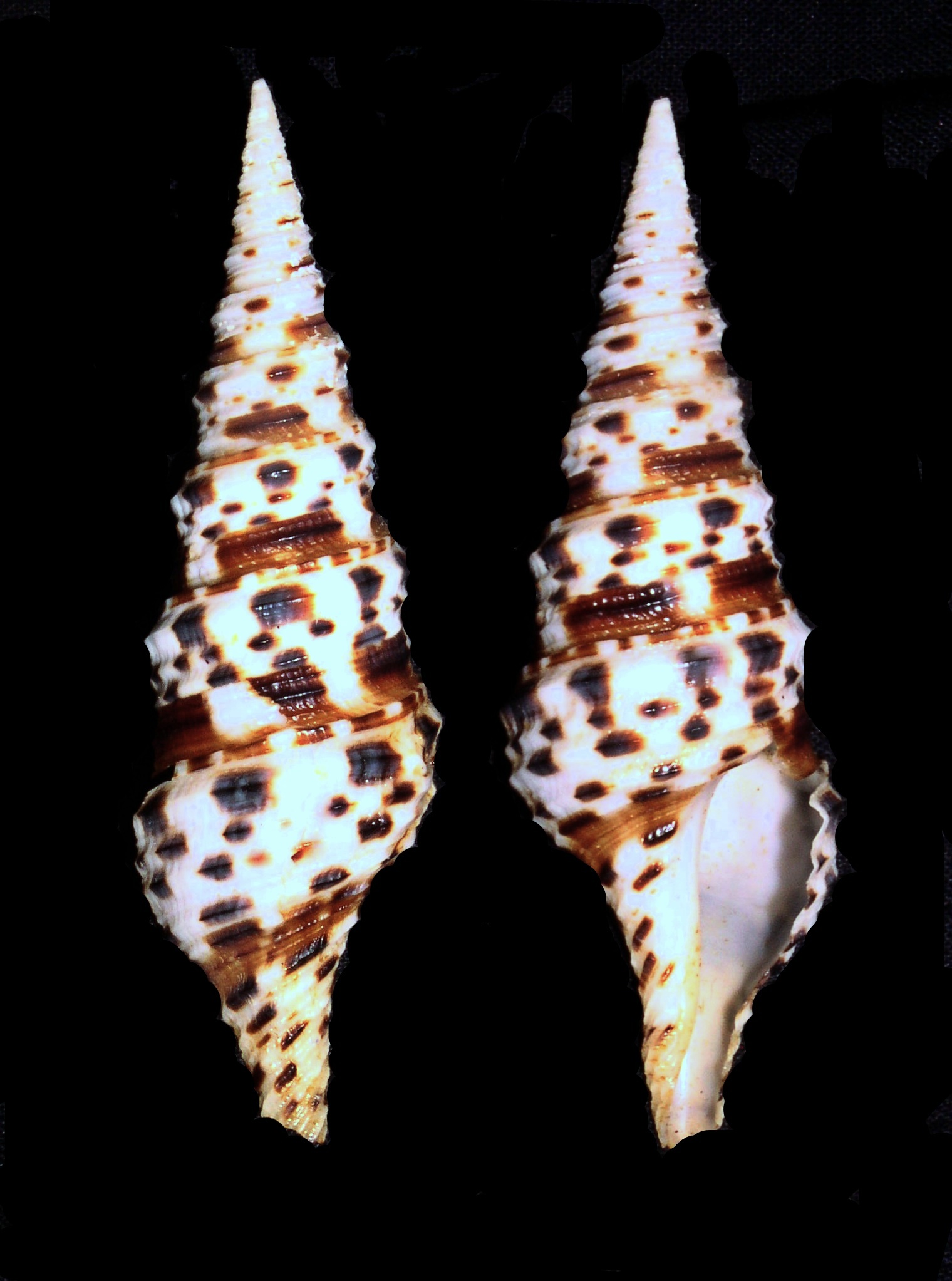
- Shell in multiple views of a Turris sea snail
  Turris
  - †Turris bimaniofus – or unidentified comparable form
  - †Turris capax
  - †Turris mediavia
  - †Turris nadoideus
  - †Turris nasuta – or unidentified comparable form
  - †Turris rockscreekensis
  - †Turris specus
- Turritella
  - †Turritella – type locality for species informal
  - †Turritella bellifera
  - †Turritella biplicata – or unidentified comparable form
  - †Turritella chirena
  - †Turritella cortezi
  - †Turritella dutexata
  - †Turritella eurynome
  - †Turritella femina
  - †Turritella hilli
  - †Turritella houstonia
  - †Turritella humerosa
  - †Turritella kincaidensis
  - †Turritella nasuta
  - †Turritella nerinexa
  - †Turritella ola
  - †Turritella plummeri
  - †Turritella polysticha
  - †Turritella prehumerosa
  - †Turritella premortoni
  - †Turritella turneri
- †Tylotrochus
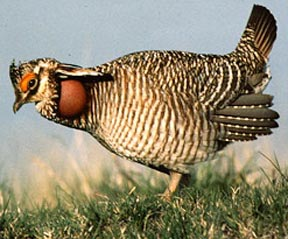
- A living Tympanuchus, or prairie chicken
  Tympanuchus
- Typhina
  - †Typhina palmerae
- †Typodus
  - †Typodus thyroidea
- Tyto
  - †Tyto furcata

== U ==
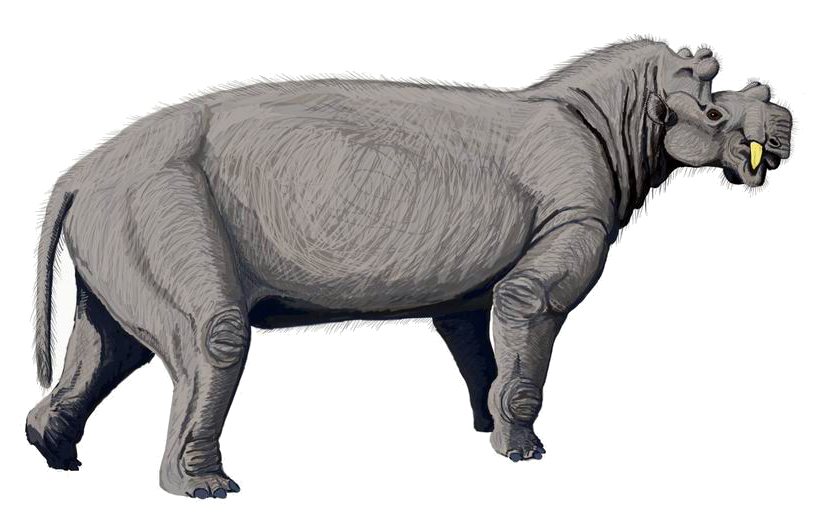
- Life restoration of the Eocene mammal Uintatherium
  †Uintatherium – or unidentified comparable form
  - †Uintatherium anceps
- Umbraculum
  - †Umbraculum planulatum
  - †Umbraculum tomaculum – type locality for species
- Unio
- Urocyon
  - †Urocyon cinereoargenteus – or unidentified comparable form
  - †Urocyon galushai
- Uromitra
  - †Uromitra brazosana
- Ursus
  - †Ursus americanus
- †Ustatochoerus
  - †Ustatochoerus leptoscelos
  - †Ustatochoerus major

== V ==
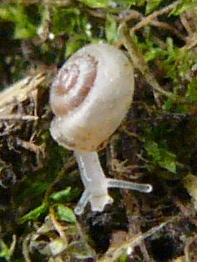
- A living Vallonia land snail
  Vallonia
  - †Vallonia gracilicosta
  - †Vallonia parvula
- †Varicobela
  - †Varicobela filum – type locality for species
- Venericardia
  - †Venericardia bashiplata
  - †Venericardia densata – type locality for species
  - †Venericardia dua
  - †Venericardia eoa
  - †Venericardia horatiana
  - †Venericardia jewelli
  - †Venericardia mediaplata
  - †Venericardia planicosta
  - †Venericardia rotunda
  - †Venericardia smithi
  - †Venericardia smithii
  - †Venericardia stewarti
  - †Venericardia texalana
- Verticordia
  - †Verticordia satex – or unidentified comparable form
- Vertigo
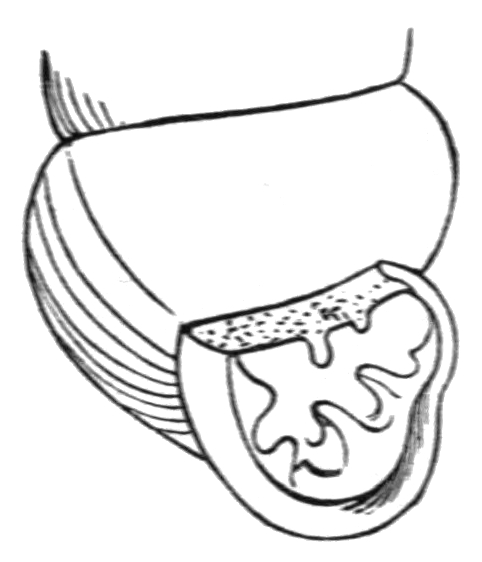
  - Illustration of the opening of the shell of a Vertigo ovata land snail, or ovate vertigo
    †Vertigo ovata
- †Vetericardiella
  - †Vetericardiella webbervillensis
- Vibracellina
  - †Vibracellina capillaria
- †Viejadjidaumo
  - †Viejadjidaumo magniscopuli – type locality for species
- †Viridomys
- †Vokesula
  - †Vokesula aldrichi
  - †Vokesula smithvillensis
- †Volutostrombus – type locality for genus
  - †Volutostrombus eocenica – type locality for species
- †Volvaria
  - †Volvaria gabbiana
  - †Volvaria reticulata
- †Volvariella
  - †Volvariella milamensis – type locality for species
- Volvulella
  - †Volvulella reklawensis – type locality for species
- Vulpes
  - †Vulpes stenognathus
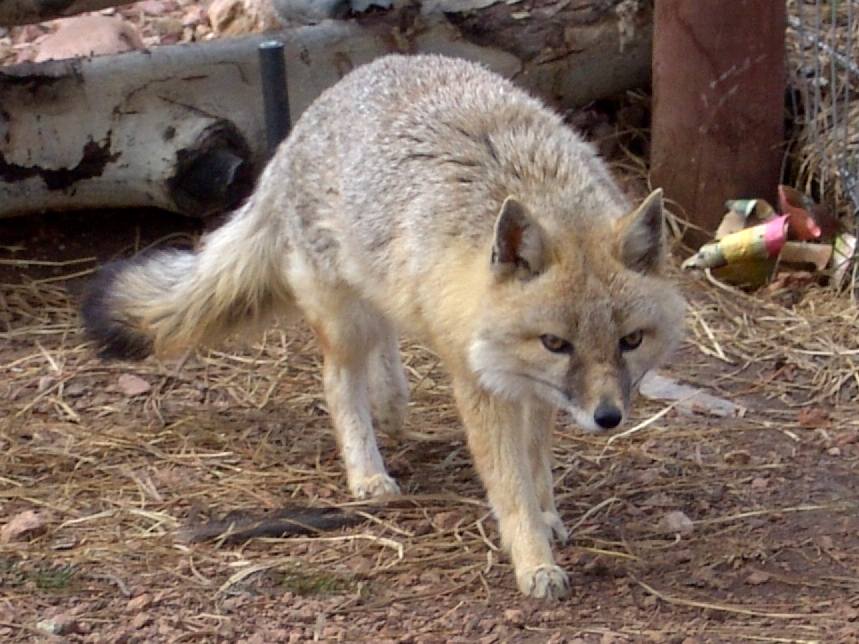
  - A living Vulpes velox, or swift fox
    †Vulpes velox
  - †Vulpes vulpes

== X ==
- †Xenochelys
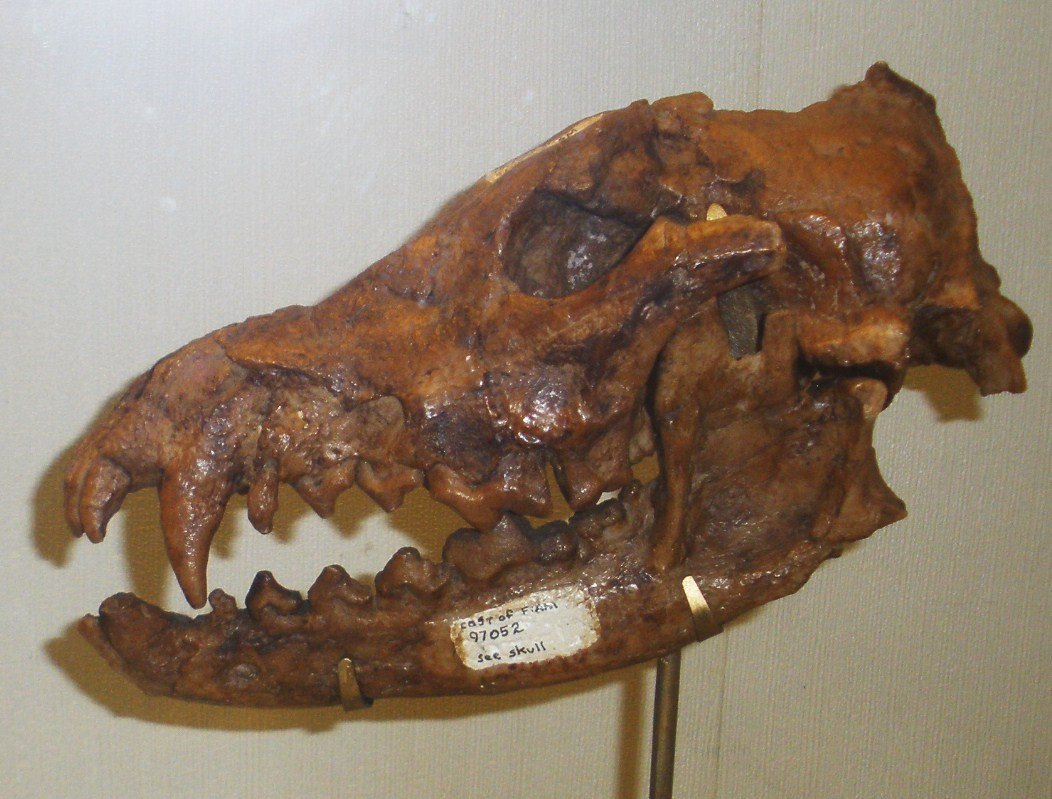
- Fossilized skull of the Pliocene-Pleistocene wolf Xenocyon
  †Xenocyon
  - †Xenocyon texanus
- Xenophora

== Y ==
- Yoldia
  - †Yoldia houstonia
  - †Yoldia kindlei
  - †Yoldia praecompsa
- Yua
  - †Yua texana – type locality for species
- †Yumaceras
  - †Yumaceras figginsi – or unidentified comparable form

== Z ==
- †Zanthopsis
  - †Zanthopsis peytoni
- †Zanycteris – tentative report
- Zonitoides
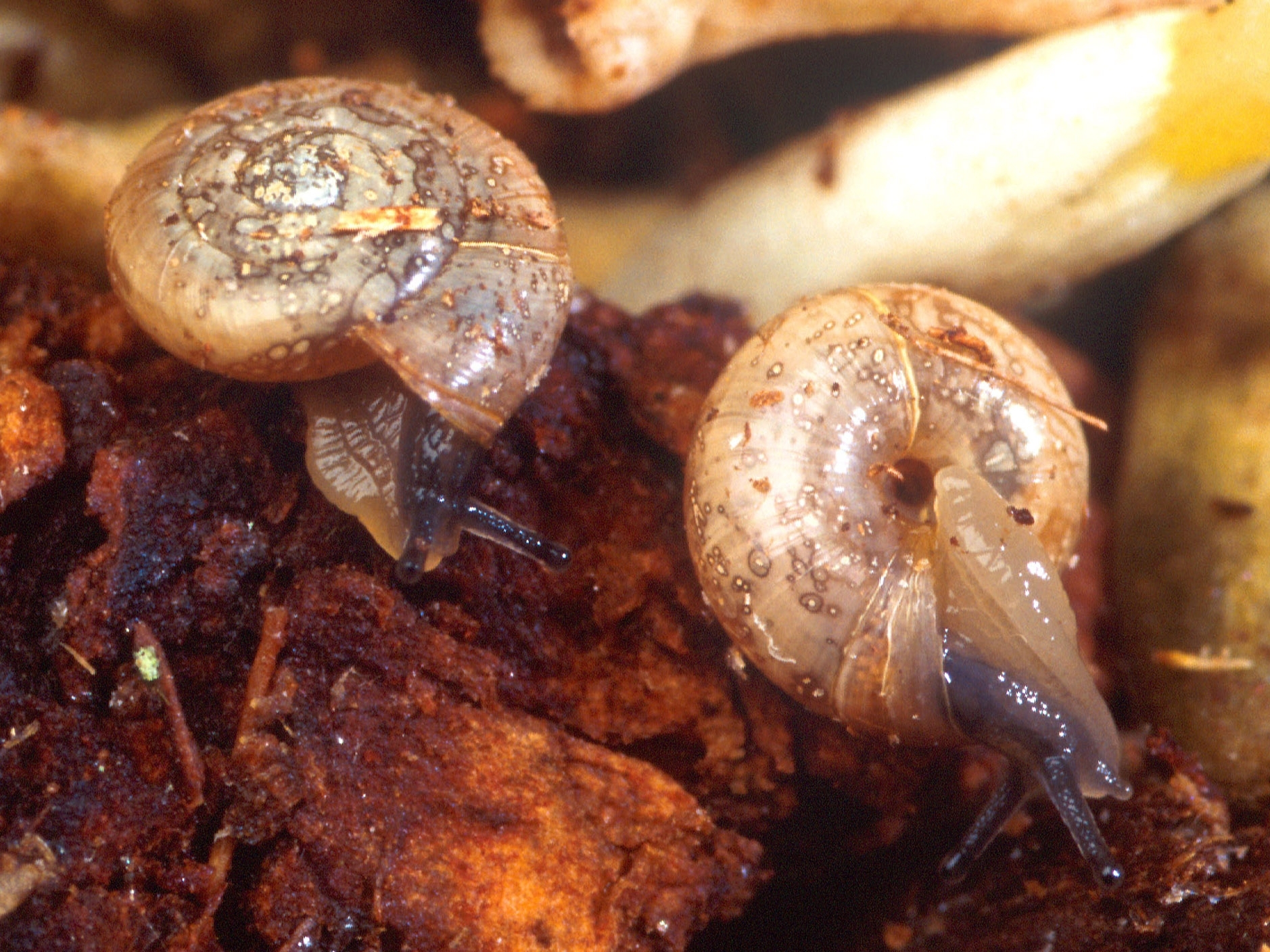
  - Living Zonitoides arboreus land snails
    †Zonitoides arboreus
