= List of the prehistoric life of Nebraska =

This list of the prehistoric life of Nebraska contains the various prehistoric life-forms whose fossilized remains have been reported from within the US state of Nebraska.

== Precambrian ==
The Paleobiology Database records no known occurrences of Precambrian fossils in Alabama.

== Paleozoic ==
- †Achistrum
- †Acroplous
  - †Acroplous vorax
- †Adacrinus
  - †Adacrinus edema – type locality for species
- †Aesiocrinus
  - †Aesiocrinus detrusus
- †Agassizodus
  - †Agassizodus variabilis
- †Aglaocrinus
  - †Aglaocrinus compactus
- †Allosocrinus
  - †Allosocrinus bronaughi
- †Ameura
  - †Ameura missouriensis
- Ammodiscus
- †Amphiscapha
  - †Amphiscapha muricata
- †Amphissites
- † Ananias
  - †Ananias marcouiana – type locality for species
- †Anthracospirifer
- †Apographiocrinus
  - †Apographiocrinus platybasis
  - †Apographiocrinus typicalis
- †Atrypa
- †Aviculopinna
- †Barbclabornia
  - †Barbclabornia luedersensis
- †Bathronocrinus
  - †Bathronocrinus wolfriverensis
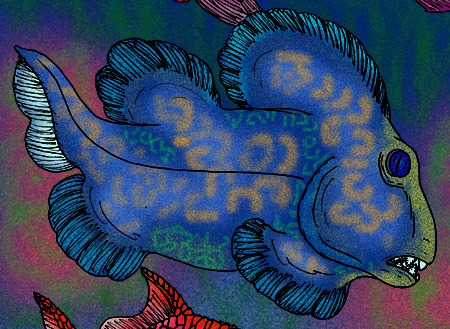
- Restoration of the Carboniferous Chimaera relative Belantsea
  †Belantsea
  - †Belantsea occidentalis
- †Bobbodus – type locality for genus
  - †Bobbodus schaefferi – type locality for species
- †Chonetes
- †Chonetinella
- †Cibolocrinus
- †Cladodus – type locality for genus
  - †Cladodus knightianus – type locality for species
- †Composita
  - †Composita subtilita
- †Concavicaris
  - †Concavicaris sinuata – or unidentified comparable form
- †Contocrinus
  - †Contocrinus stantonensis
- †Cooleyella
- †Coryellites
- †Costistricklandia
  - †Costistricklandia castellana
- †Crurithyris
  - †Crurithyris expansa
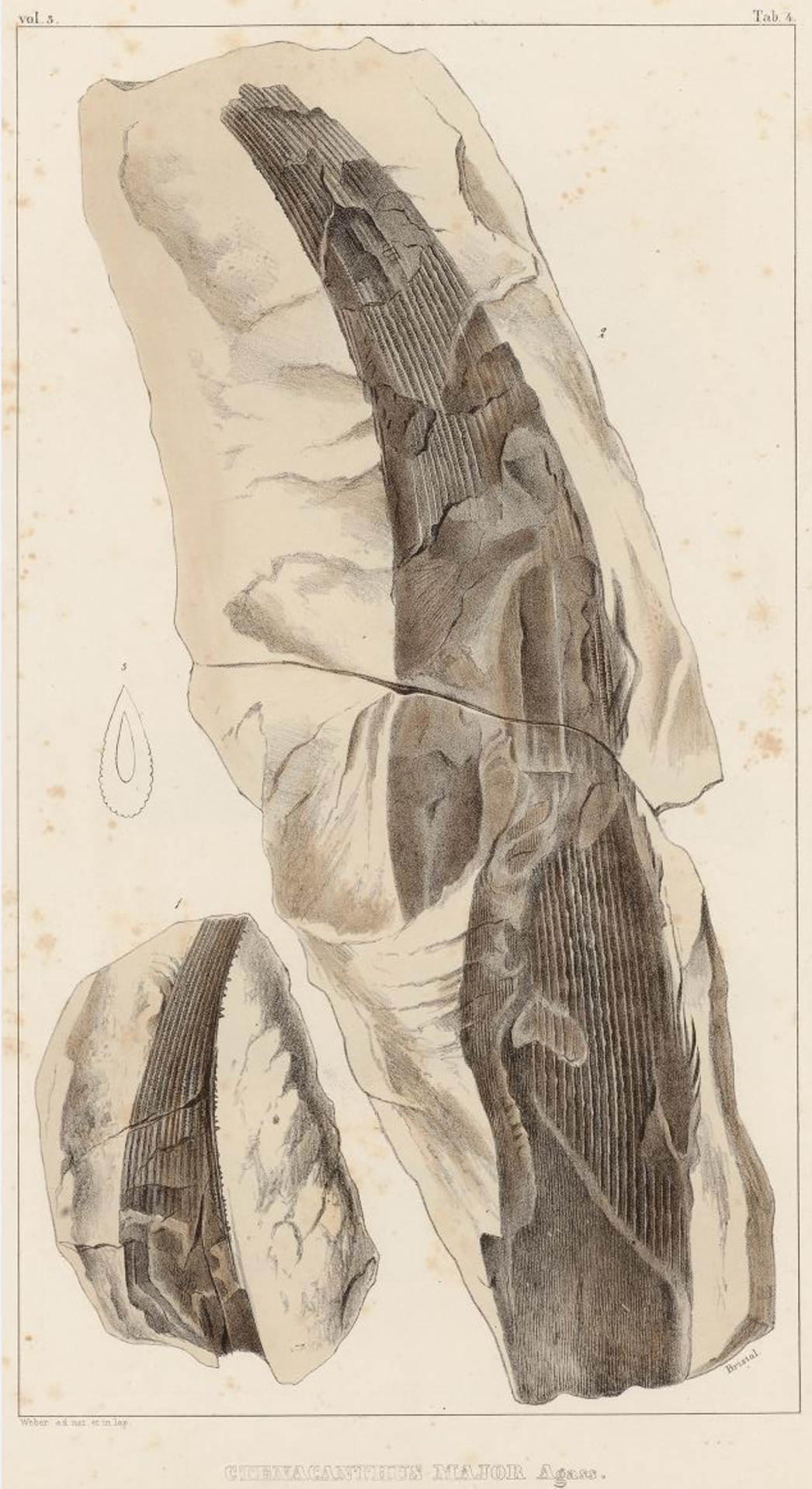
- Fossil of the Carboniferous shark Ctenacanthus
  †Ctenacanthus
  - †Ctenacanthus amblyxiphias
- †Cymatospira
  - †Cymatospira montfortianus
- †Delocrinus
  - †Delocrinus admirensis
  - †Delocrinus vastus
  - †Delocrinus vulgatus
- †Deltodus
- †Derbyia
  - †Derbyia crassa
- †Dibunophyllum
- †Ditomopyge
  - †Ditomopyge scitula
  - †Ditomopyge whitei
- †Elibatocrinus
- †Endothyra
- †Enteletes
  - †Enteletes hemiplicata – or unidentified comparable form
- Eocaudina
- †Erisocrinus
  - †Erisocrinus longwelli
  - †Erisocrinus typus
- †Euphemites
  - †Euphemites vittatus
- †Exocrinus
  - †Exocrinus multirami
- †Exoriocrinus
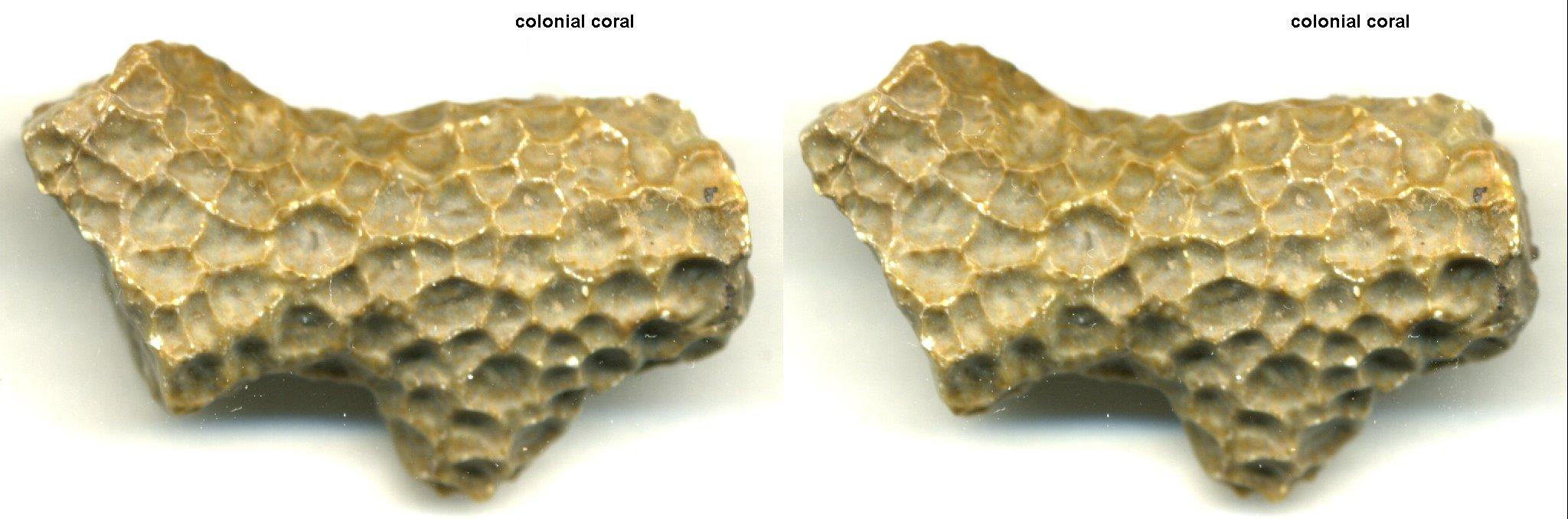
- Fossil in multiple views of the Late Devonian-Permian tabulate coral Favosites
  †Favosites
- †Fissodus
  - †Fissodus inaequalis
- †Gilliodus
  - †Gilliodus peyeri
- †Glabrocingulum
  - †Glabrocingulum grayvillense
- †Glaukosocrinus
  - †Glaukosocrinus berryi – type locality for species
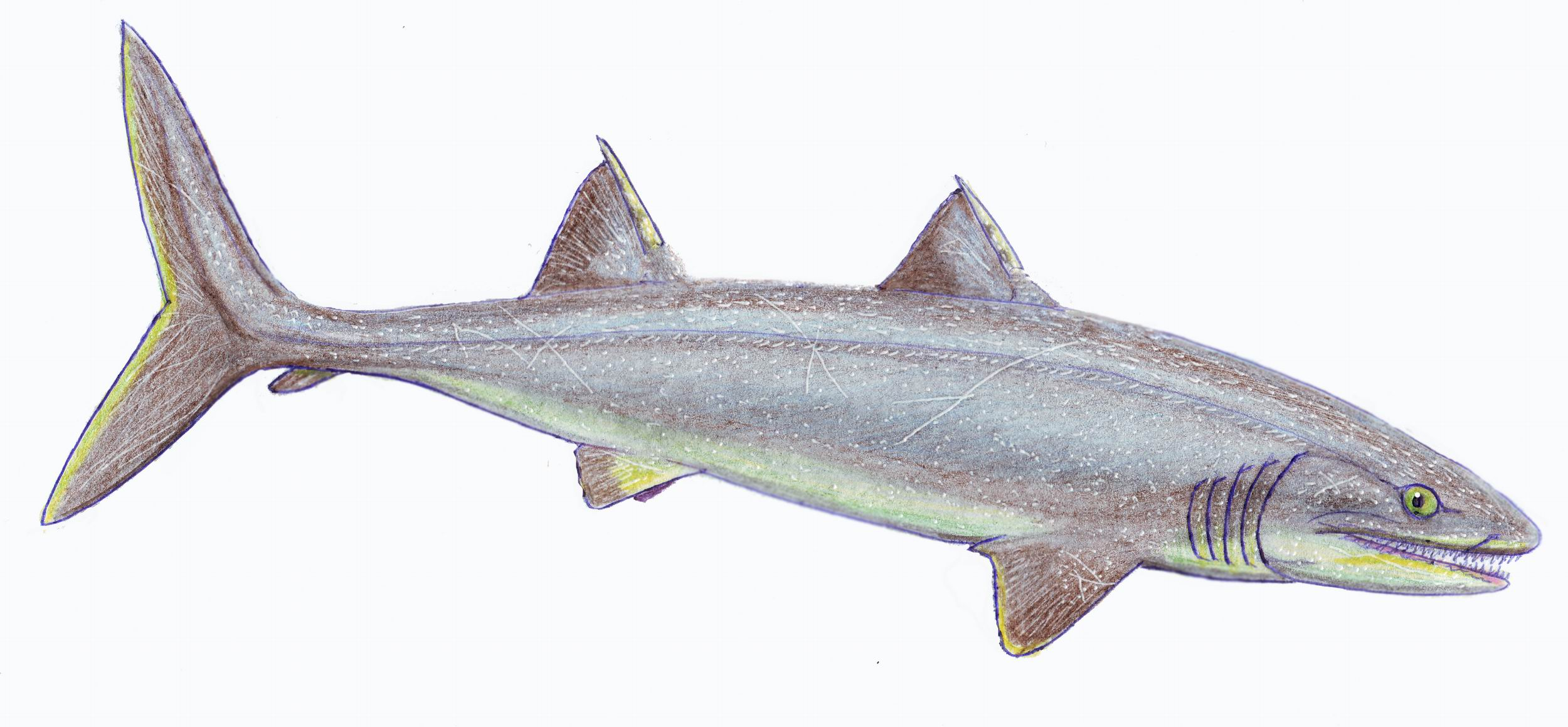
- Life restoration of the Carboniferous shark Glikmanius
  †Glikmanius
  - †Glikmanius myachkovensis
  - †Glikmanius occidentalis
- †Gorgonophontes
  - †Gorgonophontes peleron – type locality for species
- †Graffhamicrinus
  - †Graffhamicrinus boellstorffi – type locality for species
  - †Graffhamicrinus magnijkus
  - †Graffhamicrinus subcoronatus
- †Graphiocrinus
  - †Graphiocrinus scopulus – or unidentified comparable form
- †Halogetocrinus
  - †Halogetocrinus boellstorffae – type locality for species
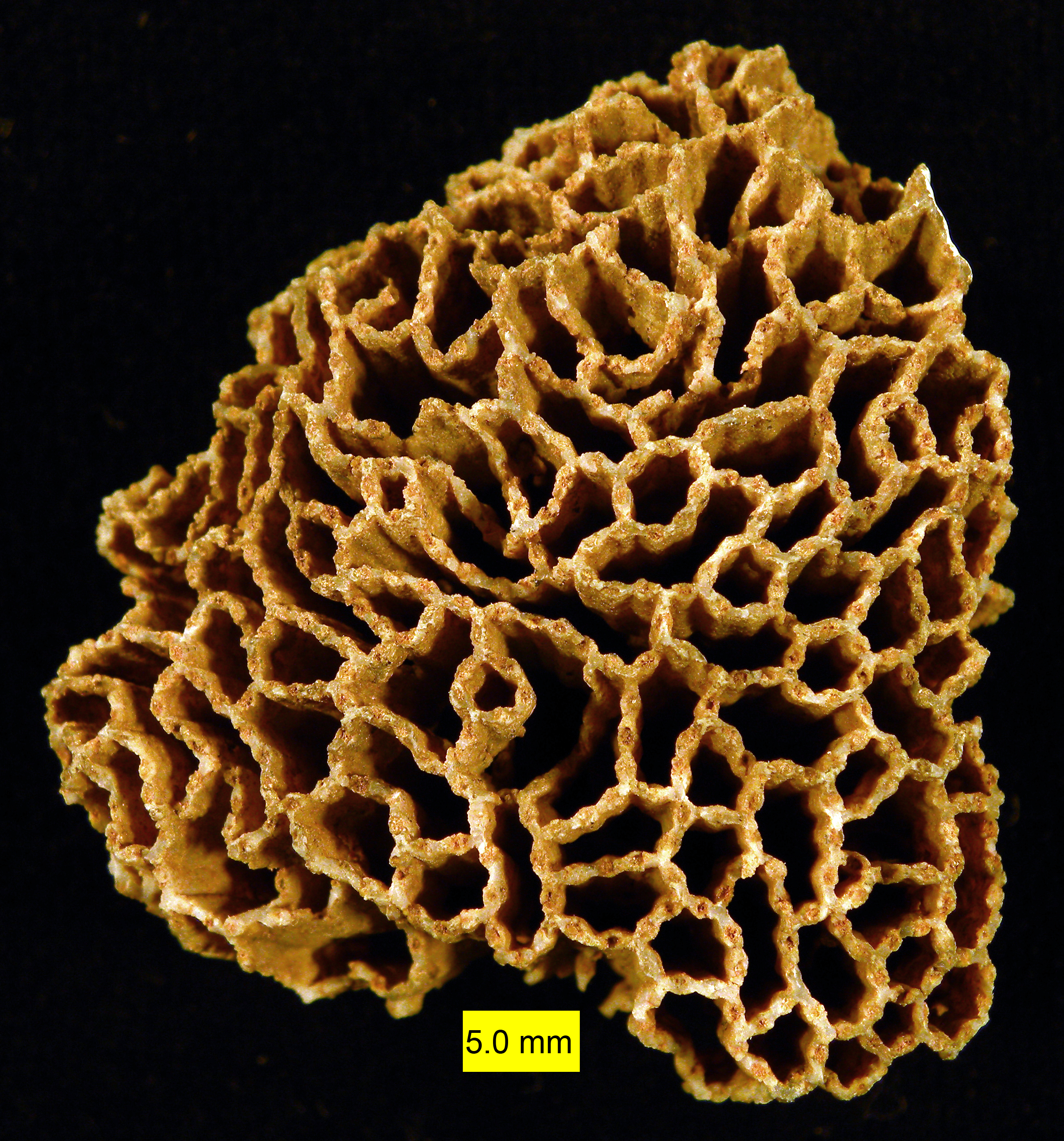
- Fossil of the Ordovician-Silurian tabulate coral Halysites
  †Halysites
- †Helodus
  - †Helodus rugosus
- †Heslerodus
  - †Heslerodus divergens
- †Hollinella
- †Holmsella
- †Hustedia
  - †Hustedia mormoni
- †Hypselentoma
  - †Hypselentoma inornata – type locality for species
  - †Hypselentoma perhumerosa
- †Hystriculina
  - †Hystriculina wabashensis
- †Ianthinopsis
  - †Ianthinopsis pulchellus
- †Iniopera
  - †Iniopera richardsoni
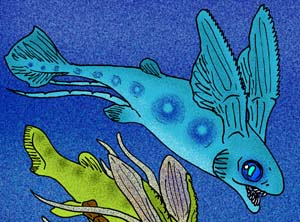
- Life restoration of the Carboniferous Chimaera relative Iniopteryx
  †Iniopteryx – type locality for genus
  - †Iniopteryx rushlau – type locality for species
  - †Iniopteryx rushlaui
  - †Iniopteryx tedwhitei – type locality for species
- †Inioxyele – type locality for genus
  - †Inioxyele whitei – type locality for species
- †Isorthis
- †Janassa
  - †Janassa maxima – type locality for species
  - †Janassa unguicula – type locality for species
- †Juresania
- †Kallimorphocrinus
- †Linoproductus
- †Lissochonetes
  - †Lissochonetes geronticus
- †Lophophyllidium
- Macrocypris
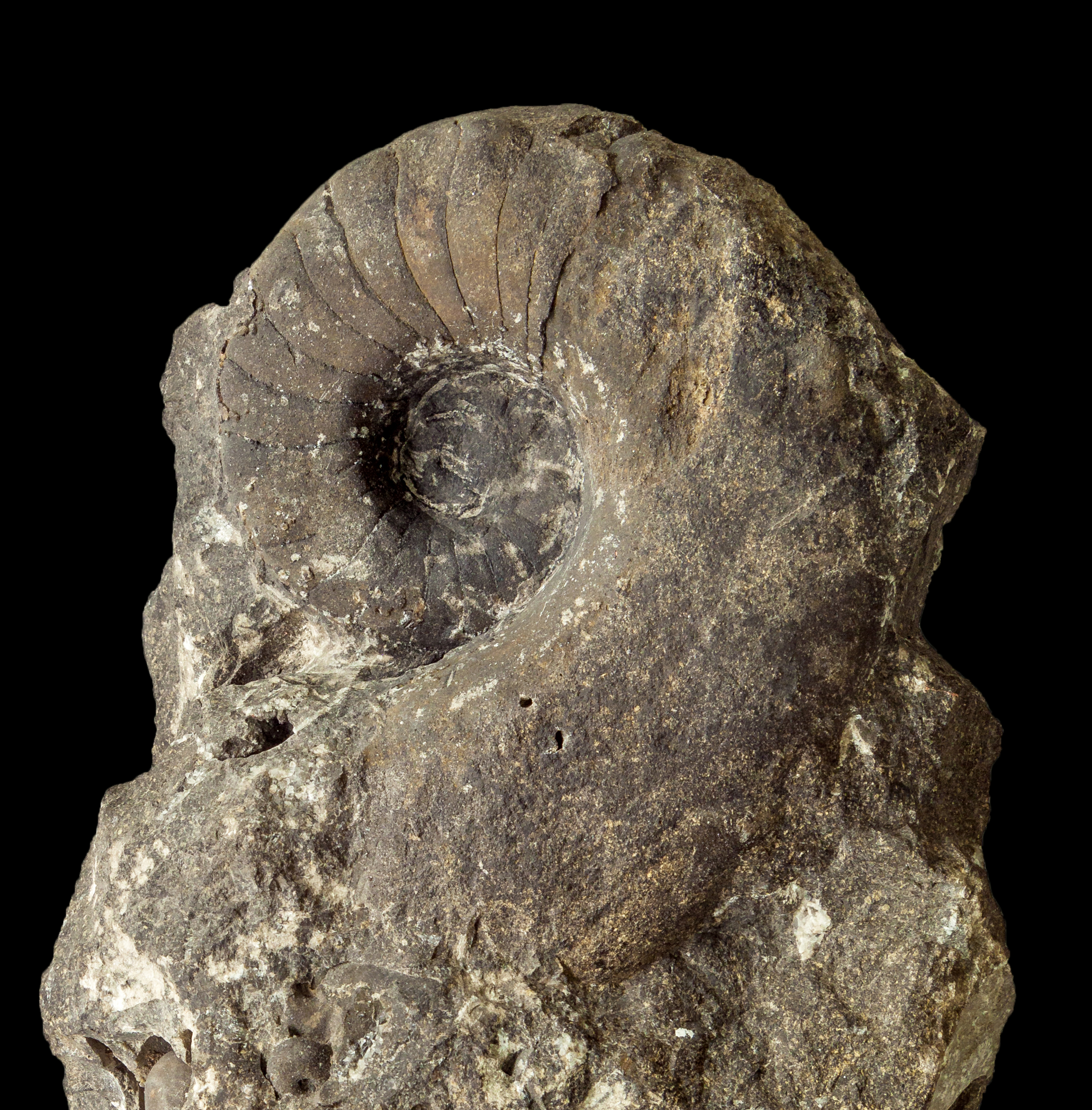
- Fossilized shell of the Carboniferous-Permian nautiloid cephalopod Metacoceras
  †Metacoceras
- †Microcaracrinus
  - †Microcaracrinus twenhofeli
- †Monongahela
- †Moreyella
- †Mycterops
  - †Mycterops whitei
- †Nebraskacrinus
  - †Nebraskacrinus tourteloti
- †Neochonetes
  - †Neochonetes granulifer
- †Neospirifer
  - †Neospirifer dunbari
- †Nodosinella – tentative report
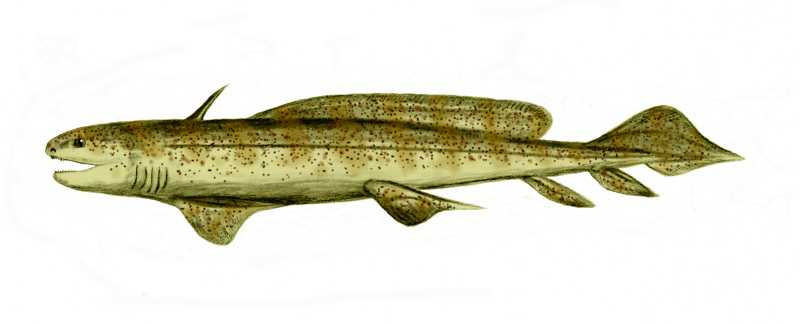
- Life restoration of the Carboniferous-Permian freshwater shark Orthacanthus
  †Orthacanthus
  - †Orthacanthus compressus
- †Orthonema
  - †Orthonema nebrascense – type locality for species
  - †Orthonema subtaeniatum – type locality for species
- †Ozarkodina
- †Paleochiridota
- †Paramphicrinus
- †Parethelocrinus
  - †Parethelocrinus variabilis
- †Parulocrinus
  - †Parulocrinus blairi
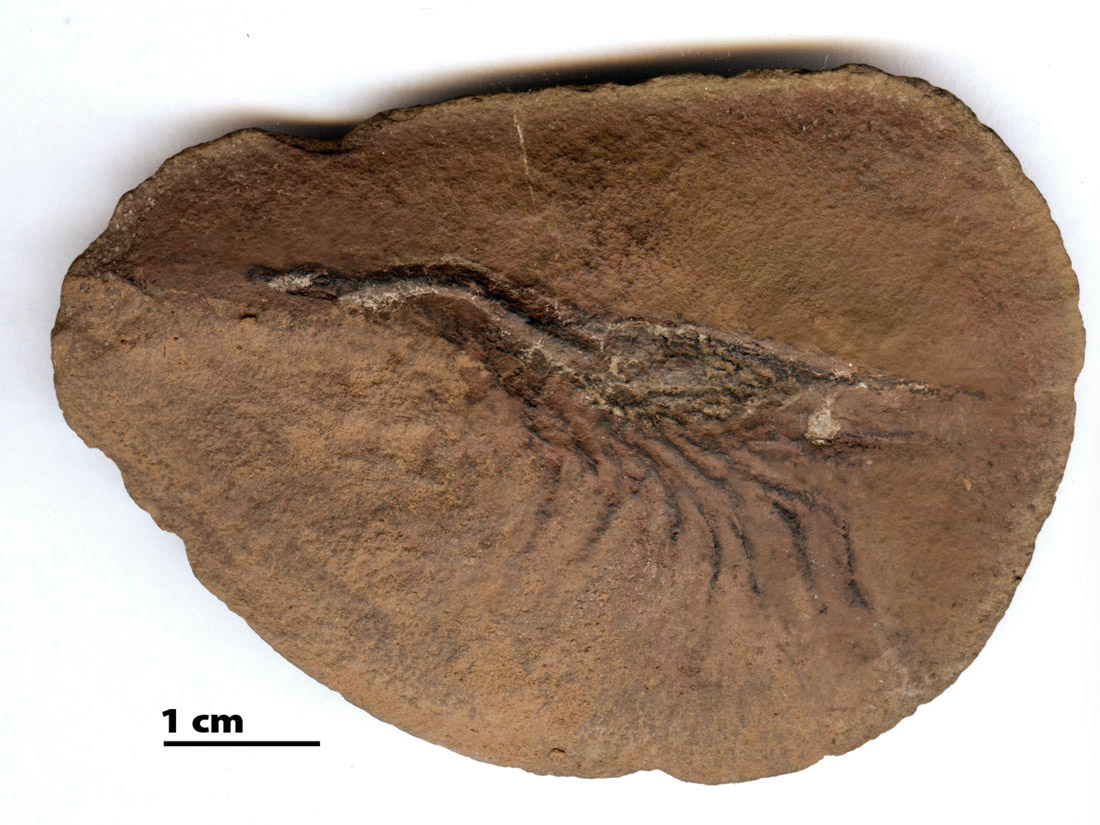
- Fossil of the Carboniferous crustacean Peachocaris
  †Peachocaris
  - †Peachocaris acanthouraea
- †Pentameroides
  - †Pentameroides corrugatus
- †Peripristis
  - †Peripristis semicircularis
- †Persephonichthys – type locality for genus
  - †Persephonichthys chthonica – type locality for species
- †Petalocrinus
- †Petalodus
  - †Petalodus alleghaniensis
  - †Petalodus arcuatus – type locality for species
  - †Petalodus destructor
- †Pharkidonotus
  - †Pharkidonotus percarinatus – type locality for species
- †Phoebodus
  - †Phoebodus knightianus – type locality for species
- †Plagioglypta
  - †Plagioglypta meekiana – type locality for species
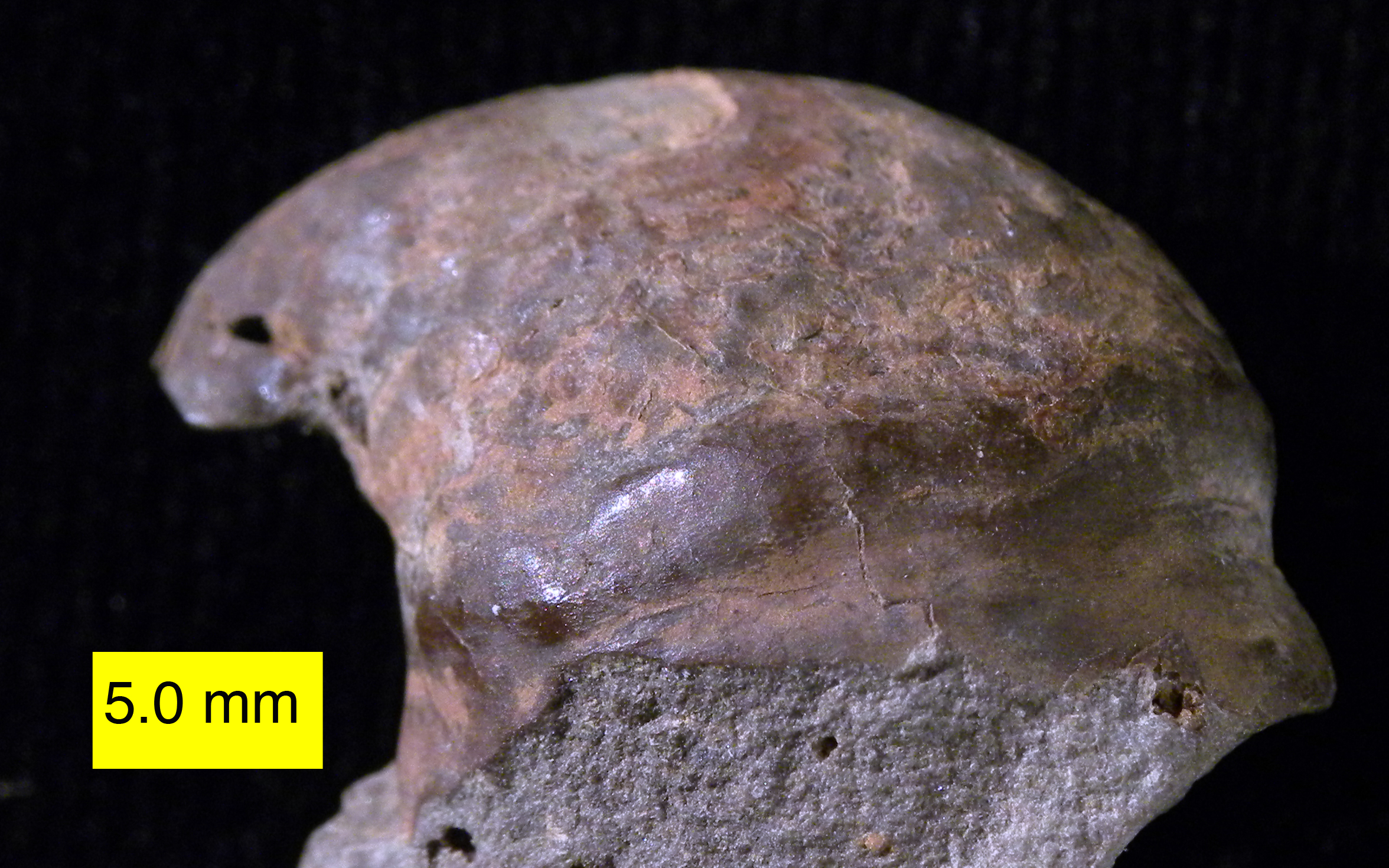
- Fossilized shell of the Silurian-Early Triassic sea snail Platyceras
  †Platyceras
- †Platyxystrodus – tentative report
  - †Platyxystrodus occidentalis – type locality for species
- †Plaxocrinus
  - †Plaxocrinus crassidiscus
- Pleurotomaria
  - †Pleurotomaria haydeniana
- †Plummericrinus
- †Polusocrinus
  - †Polusocrinus rosa
- †Polypora
- †Porpites
- †Promexyele
  - †Promexyele bairdi – type locality for species
- †Protocaudina
- Psammosphaera
- †Ptylopora
- †Punctospirifer
  - †Punctospirifer kentuckensis
- †Reticulatia
  - †Reticulatia huecoensis
- †Retispira
  - †Retispira marcouianus – type locality for species
- †Rhipidomella
  - †Rhipidomella carbonaria
- †Rhombopora
- †Romerodus – type locality for genus
  - †Romerodus orodontus – type locality for species
- †Royalella
  - †Royalella swallowiana – type locality for species
- †Sciadiocrinus
  - †Sciadiocrinus humilis
- †Shumardella
- †Sibyrhynchus
  - †Sibyrhynchus denisoni
- †Stearoceras
  - †Stearoceras sublaeve – type locality for species
- †Stellarocrinus
  - †Stellarocrinus stillativus
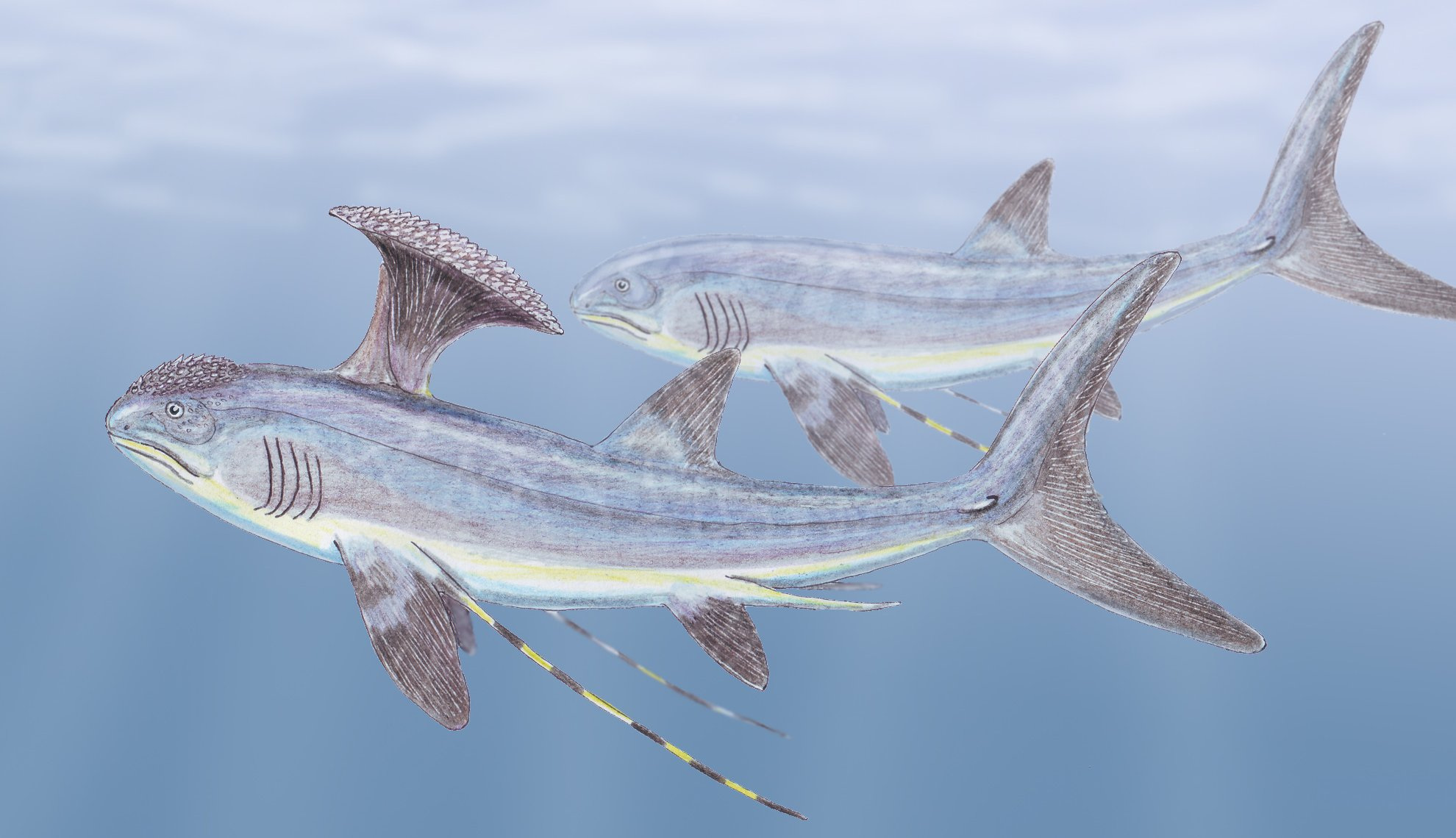
- Life restorations of a male (foreground) and female (background) of the Late Devonian-Carboniferous Chimaera relative Stethacanthus
  †Stethacanthus
  - †Stethacanthus altonensis
- †Streblodus
  - †Streblodus angustus – type locality for species
- †Streptognathodus
- †Synarmocrinus
  - †Synarmocrinus iatani
- †Syringopora
- †Tainoceras
  - †Tainoceras nebrascense
- †Terpnocrinus
- †Tetravirga
- †Triceracrinus
- †Ulocrinus
- †Vertigocrinus
  - †Vertigocrinus parilis
- †Wellerella
  - †Wellerella cooperi – or unidentified comparable form
  - †Wellerella delicatula – or unidentified comparable form
- †Wellergyi
  - †Wellergyi subdecussatus – type locality for species

== Mesozoic ==
- †Acanthichthys – type locality for genus
  - †Acanthichthys major – type locality for species
- †Acritodromum – type locality for genus
  - †Acritodromum ellipticum – type locality for species
- †Anisodromum – type locality for genus
  - †Anisodromum wolfei – type locality for species
- †Arcellites
  - †Arcellites disciformis
- †Citrophyllum
  - †Citrophyllum doylei – type locality for species
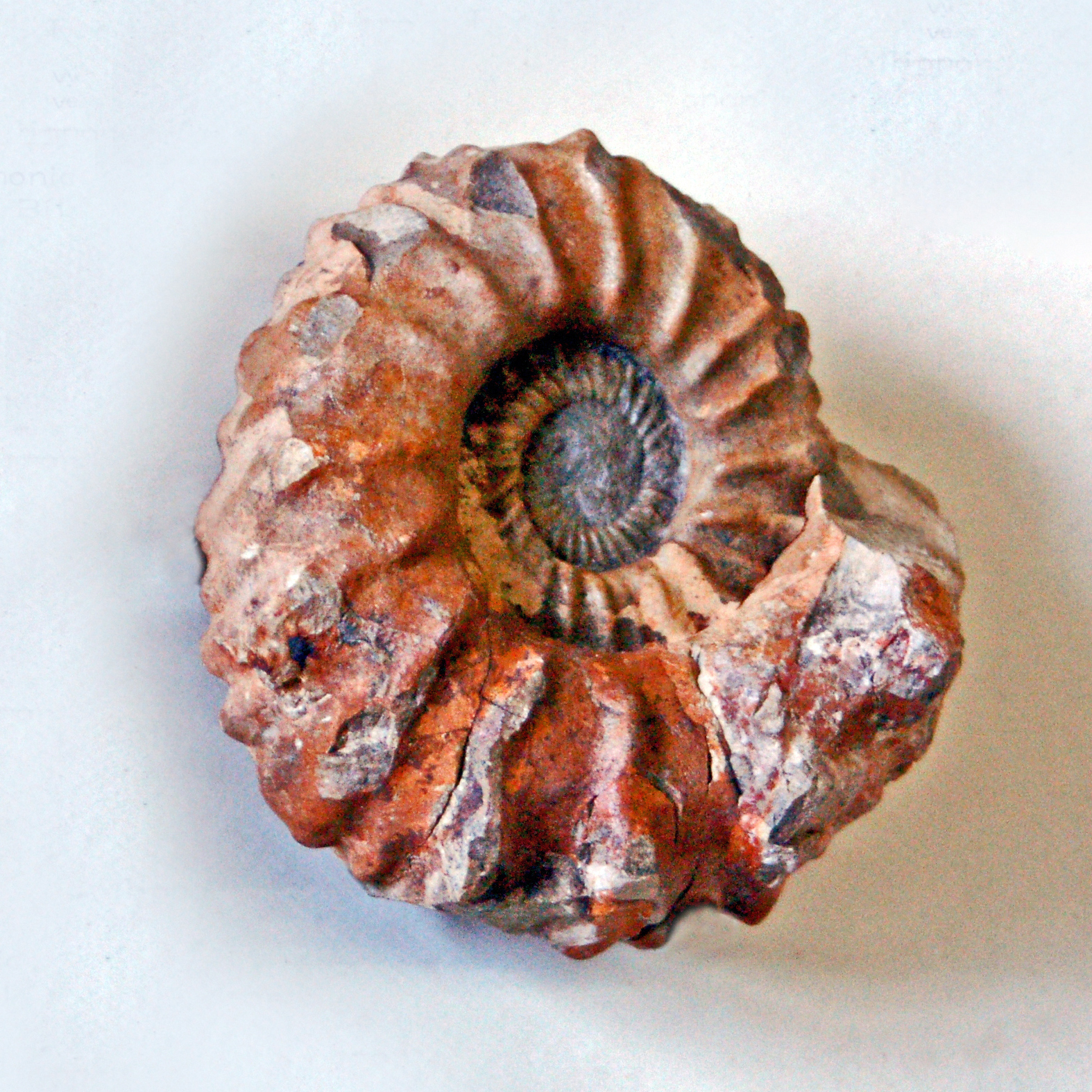
- Fossilized shell of the Late Cretaceous ammonoid Collignoniceras
  †Collignoniceras
  - †Collignoniceras percarinatum
  - †Collignoniceras praecox
  - †Collignoniceras vermilionense
- †Crassidenticulum
  - †Crassidenticulum decurrens
- †Densinervum – type locality for genus
  - †Densinervum kaulii – type locality for species
- Dicotylophyllum
  - †Dicotylophyllum aliquantuliserratum – type locality for species
  - †Dicotylophyllum angularis – type locality for species
  - †Dicotylophyllum expansolobum – type locality for species
  - †Dicotylophyllum myrtophylloides – type locality for species
  - †Dicotylophyllum rosafluviatilis – type locality for species
- †Didromophyllum – type locality for genus
  - †Didromophyllum basingerii – type locality for species
- †Didymoceras
  - †Didymoceras cheyennense
- †Inoceramus
  - †Inoceramus apicalis
  - †Inoceramus cuvieri
  - †Inoceramus fragilis
- †Landonia – type locality for genus
  - †Landonia calophylla – type locality for species
- †Longstrethia – type locality for genus
  - †Longstrethia varidentata – type locality for species
- †Minerisporites
  - †Minerisporites dissimilis – type locality for species
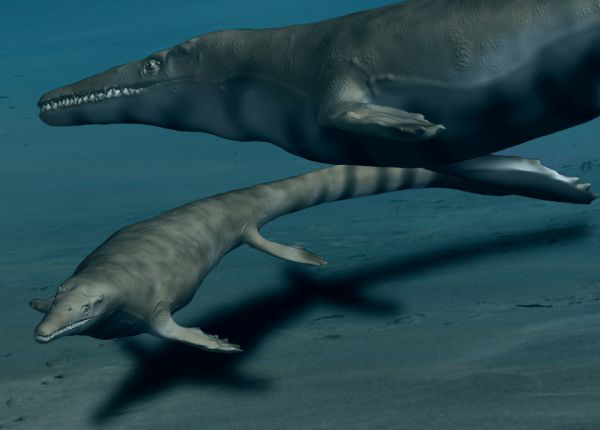
- Life restoration of two of the Late Cretaceous Mosasaurus
  †Mosasaurus
- †Mytiloides
  - †Mytiloides labiatus
  - †Mytiloides mytiloides
- †Pabiania – type locality for genus
  - †Pabiania variloba – type locality for species
- †Pandemophyllum – type locality for genus
  - †Pandemophyllum attenuatum – type locality for species
  - †Pandemophyllum kvacekii – type locality for species
- †Perotriletes
  - †Perotriletes striatus
- †Pseudoperna
  - †Pseudoperna congesta
- †Reynoldsiophyllum
  - †Reynoldsiophyllum nebrascense – type locality for species
- †Rhaeboceras
- †Rosselia – or unidentified comparable form
- †Scaphites
  - †Scaphites patulus
- †Skolithos – or unidentified comparable form
- Animated life restoration of the Late Cretaceous plesiosaur Styxosaurus
  †Styxosaurus – type locality for genus
- †Volviceramus
  - †Volviceramus involutus

== Cenozoic ==
=== Selected Cenozoic taxa of Nebraska ===
- Acer
- Acipenser
- Acris
  - †Acris crepitans – or unidentified comparable form
- †Acritohippus
  - †Acritohippus isonesus
- †Aelurodon
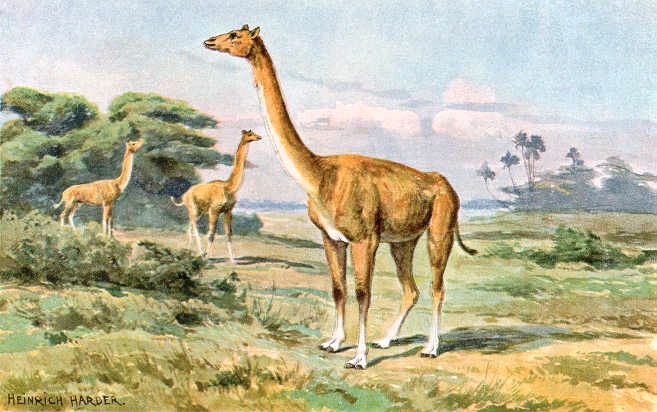
- Life restoration of the Miocene camel Aepycamelus, or the long-necked camel. Heinrich Harder (1920).
  †Aepycamelus
  - †Aepycamelus major
  - †Aepycamelus robustus
- Agkistrodon
- †Agnotocastor
- †Agriochoerus
- †Agriotherium
- †Aletomeryx
- †Alforjas
- Alligator
- Alnus
- †Ambrosia
- †Ambystoma
  - †Ambystoma maculatum
  - †Ambystoma tigrinum
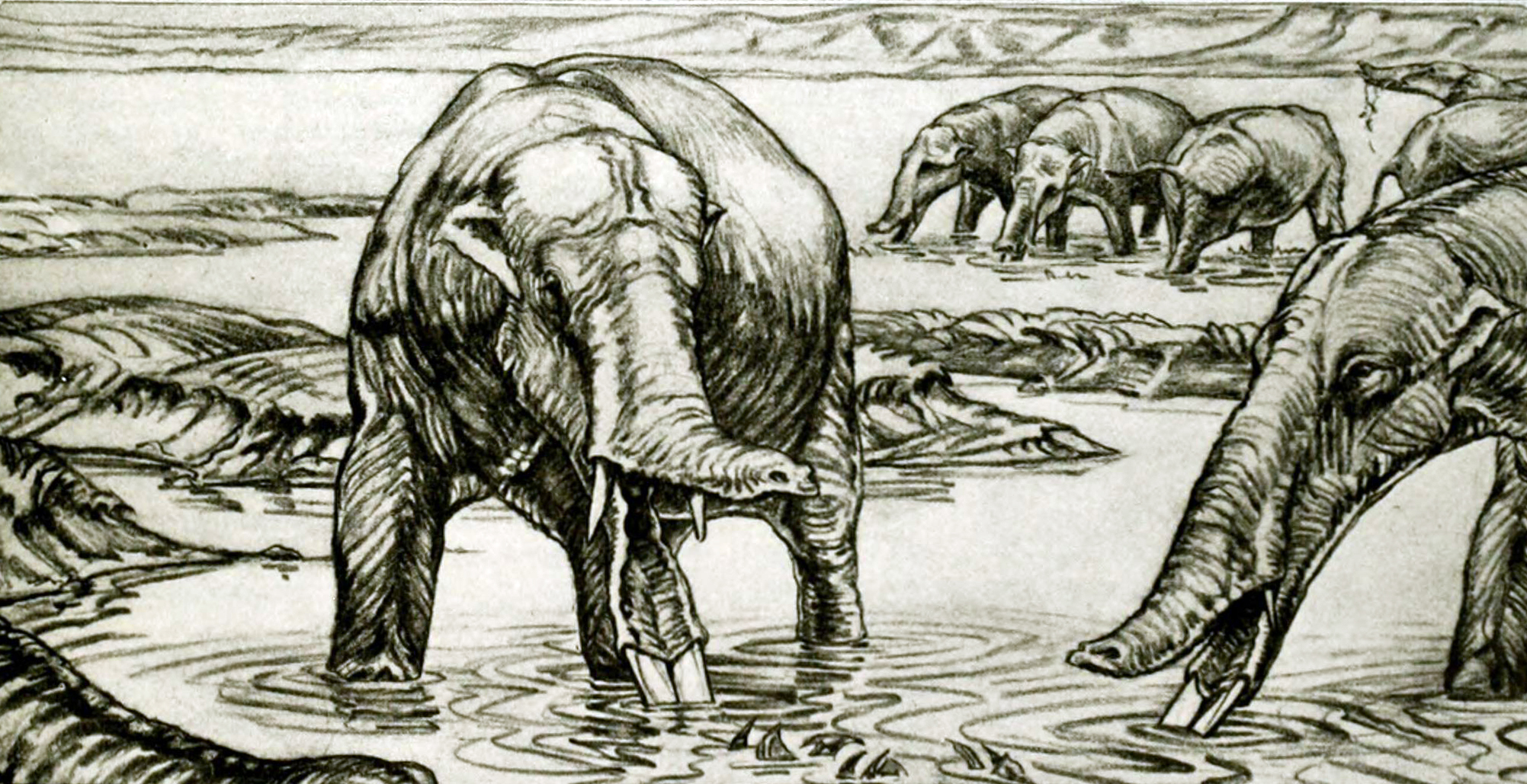
- Life restoration of the Miocene elephant relative Amebelodon. Margret Flinsch (1932).
  †Amebelodon
- Amia
  - †Amia calva
- Ammospermophilus
- †Amphechinus
- †Amphicyon
  - †Amphicyon frendens – type locality for species
  - †Amphicyon galushai – type locality for species
  - †Amphicyon ingens
- †Amphimachairodus
- †Anchitheriomys
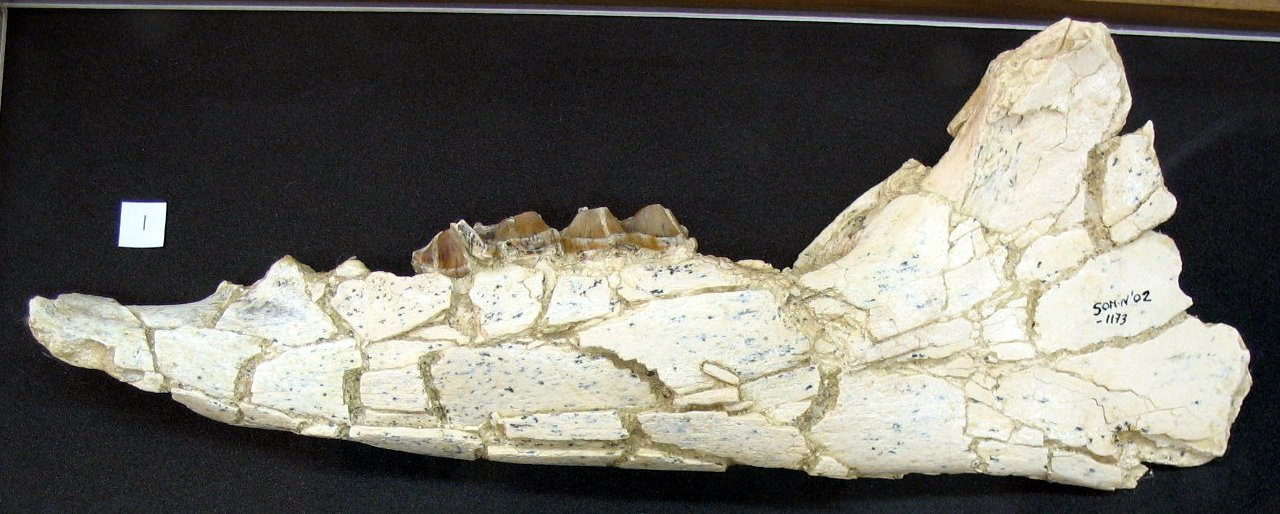
- Fossilized mandibles of the Miocene three-toed horse Anchitherium
  †Anchitherium
- †Andrias
- Antrozous – or unidentified comparable form
- Apalone
  - †Apalone spinifera
- †Aphelops
- Aplodinotus
  - †Aplodinotus grunniens
- Aramus
- †Archaeocyon
- †Archaeohippus
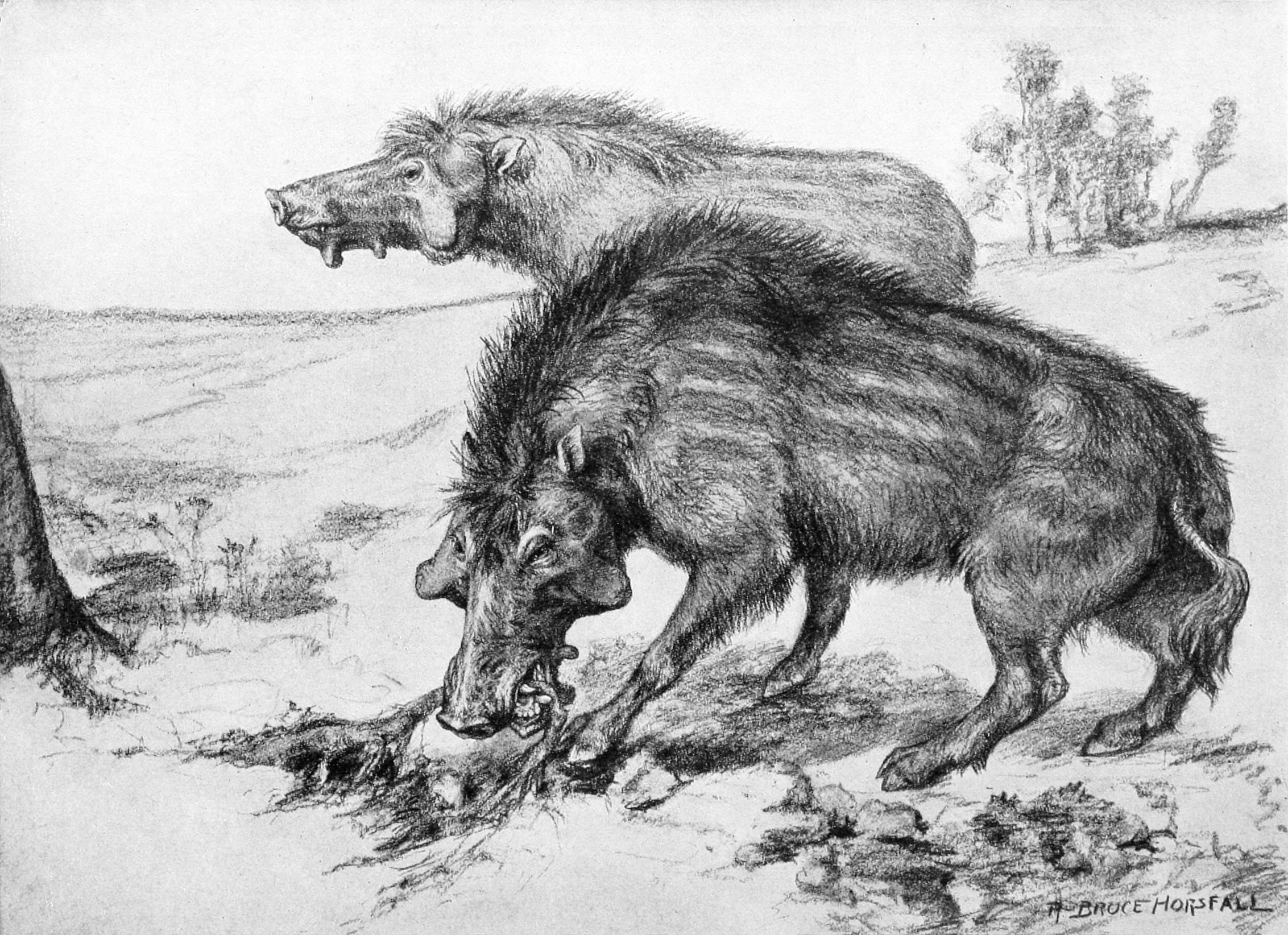
- Life restoration of the Eocene-Oligocene entelodont mammal Archaeotherium
  †Archaeotherium
- †Arctodus
  - †Arctodus simus
- †Arctonasua
- Ardea
- Arizona
- †Artemisia
- †Astrohippus
- Atractosteus
  - †Atractosteus spatula
- Baiomys
- Balearica
- †Barbourofelis
  - †Barbourofelis fricki
  - †Barbourofelis morrisi – type locality for species
  - †Barbourofelis whitfordi – type locality for species
- Bassariscus
- †Bathornis
  - †Bathornis veredus
- †Bathygenys
- Betula – or unidentified comparable form
- Bison
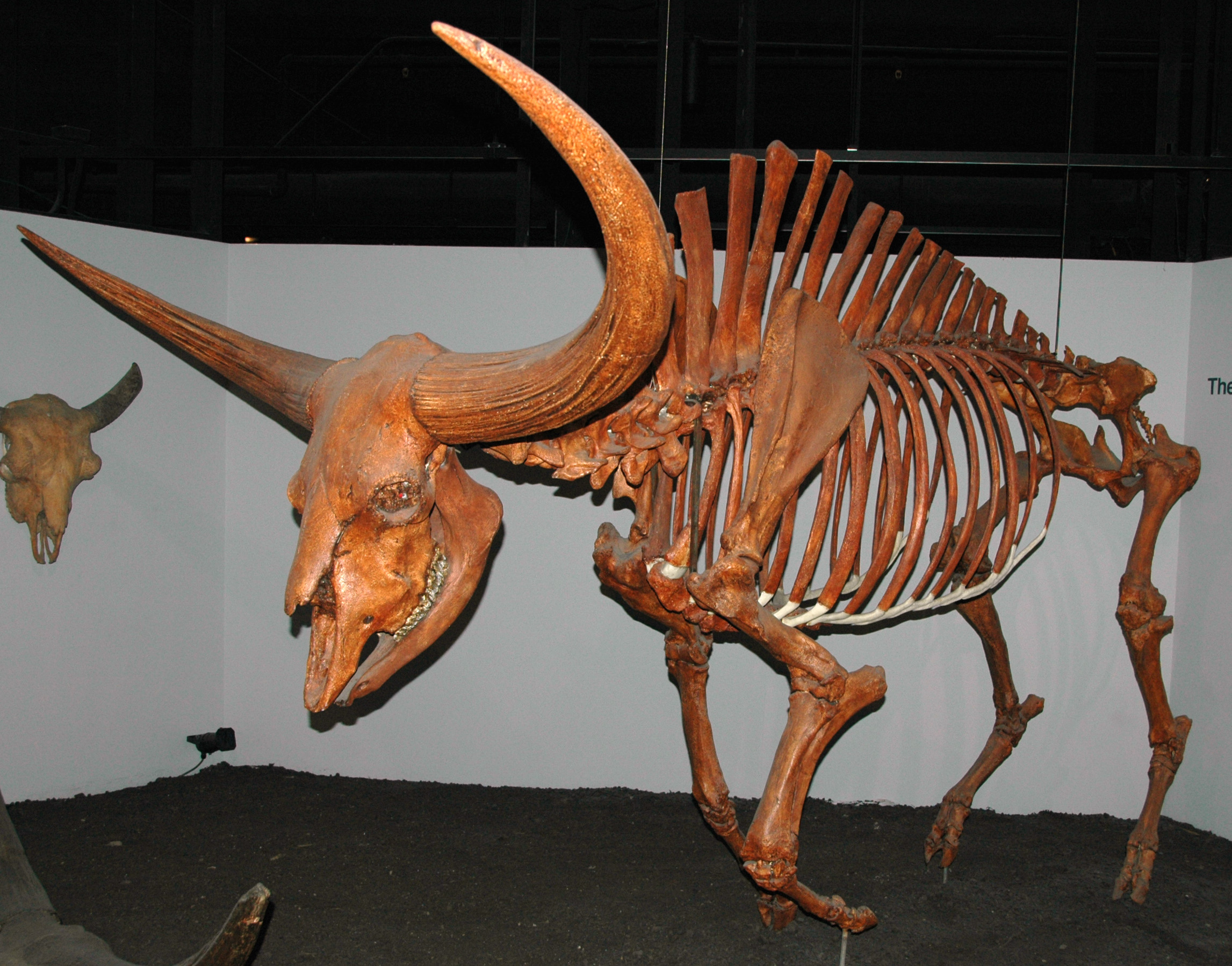
  - Mounted fossilized skeleton of the Pleistocene Bison latifrons, also known as the giant bison or long-horned bison
    †Bison latifrons
- Blarina
  - †Blarina brevicauda
- †Blastomeryx
  - †Blastomeryx gemmifer – type locality for species
- †Bootherium
  - †Bootherium bombifrons – type locality for species
- †Borophagus
  - †Borophagus diversidens
  - †Borophagus pugnator
  - †Borophagus secundus
- †Bothriodon
- †Brachycrus
- †Brachypsalis
- †Brachyrhynchocyon
- †Brontops
- Bufo
  - †Bufo cognatus
- Burhinus
- Buteo
- †Calippus
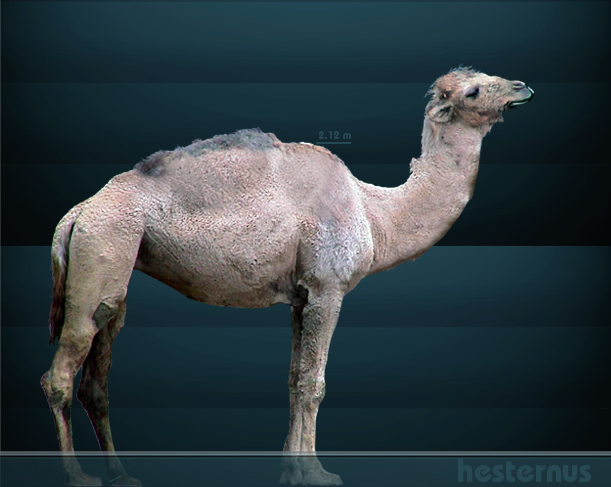
- Life restoration of the Pliocene-Holocene camel Camelops
  †Camelops
  - †Camelops hesternus
- Canis
  - †Canis dirus
  - †Canis edwardii
  - †Canis ferox
  - †Canis latrans
  - †Canis lepophagus
- †Capromeryx
- †Carpocyon
- Carya
- Castor
  - †Castor californicus – or unidentified comparable form
- †Castoroides
- Cedrela
- Celtis
- †Cephalogale
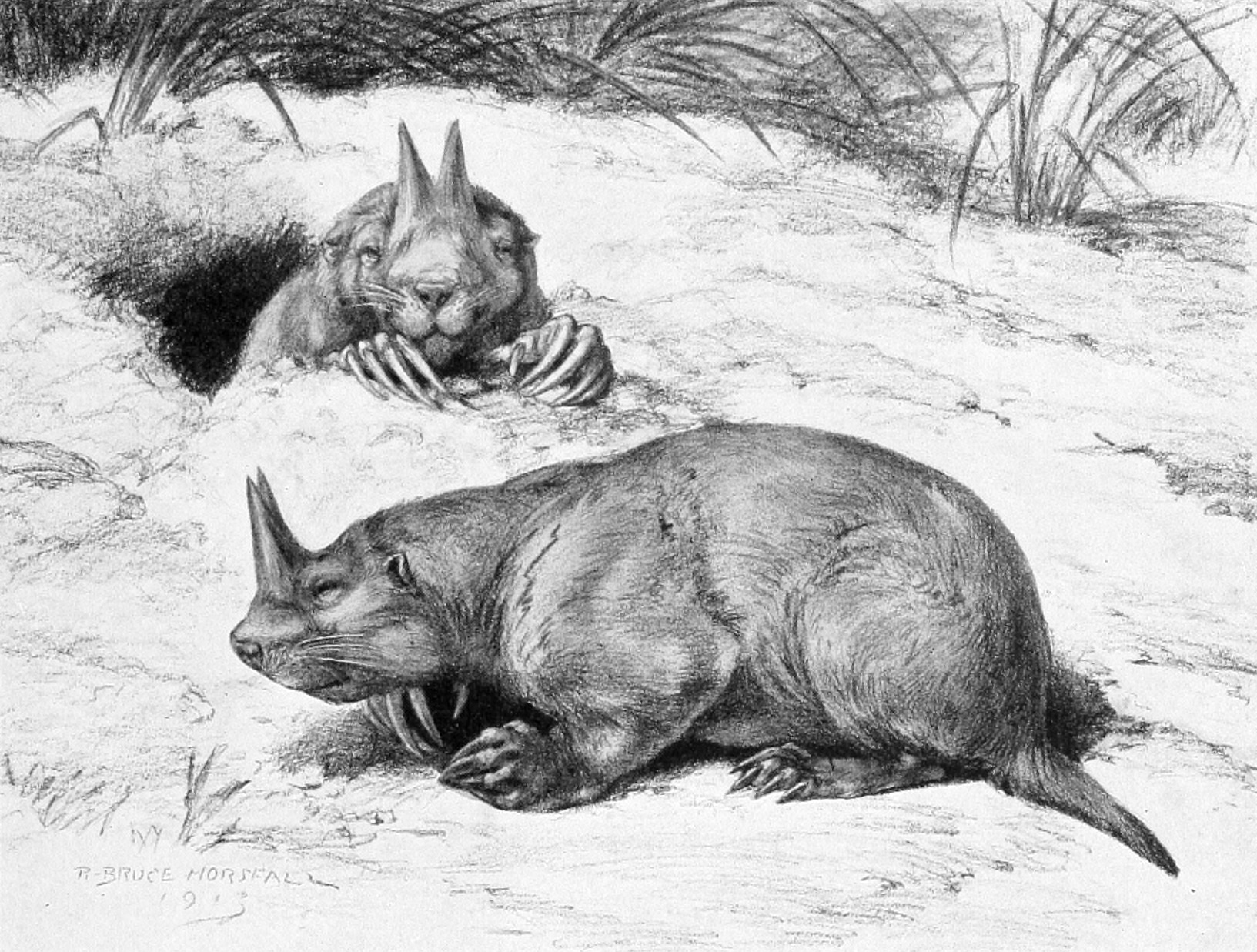
- Life restoration of the Miocene-Pleistocene horned gopher Ceratogaulus. Robert Bruce Horsfall (1913).
  †Ceratogaulus
  - †Ceratogaulus anecdotus
  - †Ceratogaulus hatcheri
  - †Ceratogaulus rhinocerus
- †Cervalces
- Chaetodipus
  - †Chaetodipus hispidus
- †Chamaecyparis
- Charina
- Chelydra
  - †Chelydra serpentina
- †Chelydrops
  - †Chelydrops stricta – type locality for species
- Chrysemys
  - †Chrysemys picta
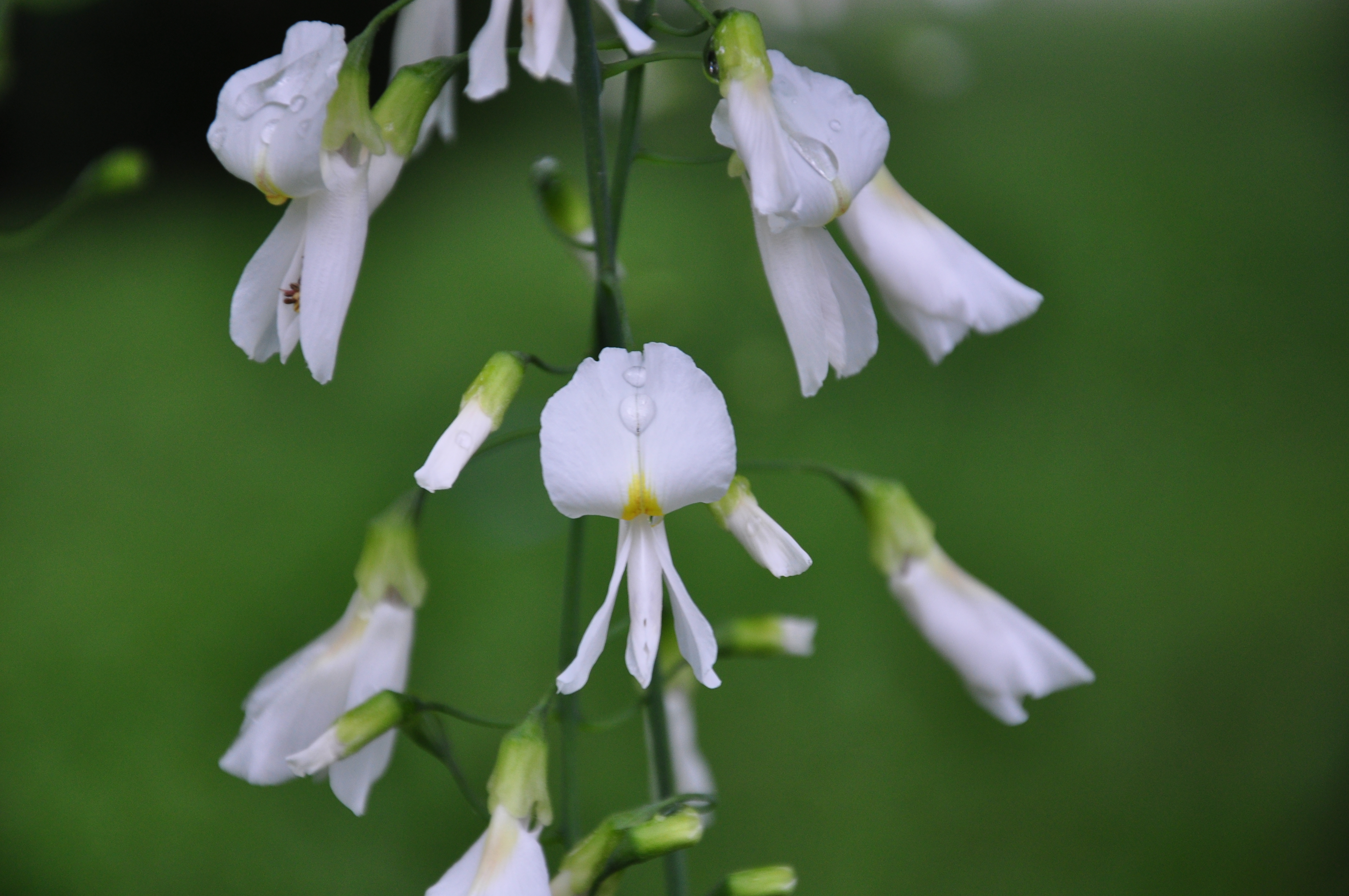
- Flowers of a living Cladrastis, or yellowwood
  Cladrastis
- Clethrionomys
  - †Clethrionomys gapperi – or unidentified comparable form
- Cnemidophorus
  - †Cnemidophorus sexlineatus
- Cocculus
- †Colodon
- Coluber
  - †Coluber constrictor
- †Conuropsis
- †Cordia
- †Cormocyon
- †Cormohipparion
- †Cosoryx
  - †Cosoryx furcatus
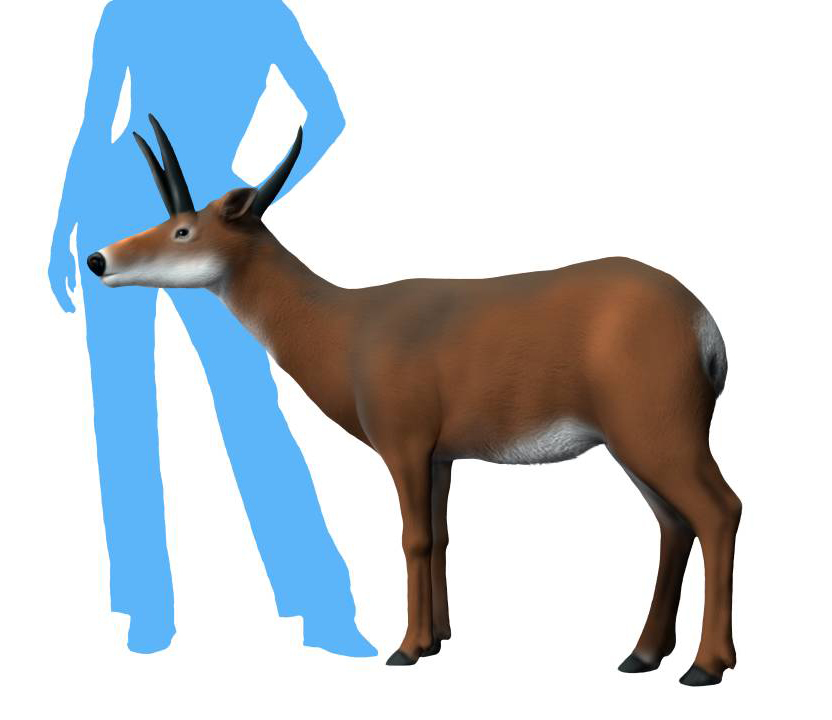
- Restoration of the Miocene palaeomerycid Cranioceras, a relative of modern deer, with anachronistic human to scale
  †Cranioceras
- Crataegus
- Crotalus
  - †Crotalus horridus
- Cryptotis
- †Cynarctoides
  - †Cynarctoides acridens
  - †Cynarctoides emryi – type locality for species
  - †Cynarctoides roii
- †Cynarctus
- †Cynelos
- †Cynodesmus
- Cynomys
- †Daphoenictis
- †Daphoenodon
- Life restoration of the Eocene-Miocene bear dog Daphoenus
  †Daphoenus – type locality for genus
- Dasypus
  - †Dasypus bellus
- †Desmatippus
- †Desmatochoerus
- †Desmocyon
- †Diceratherium
- Dicrostonyx
  - †Dicrostonyx torquatus
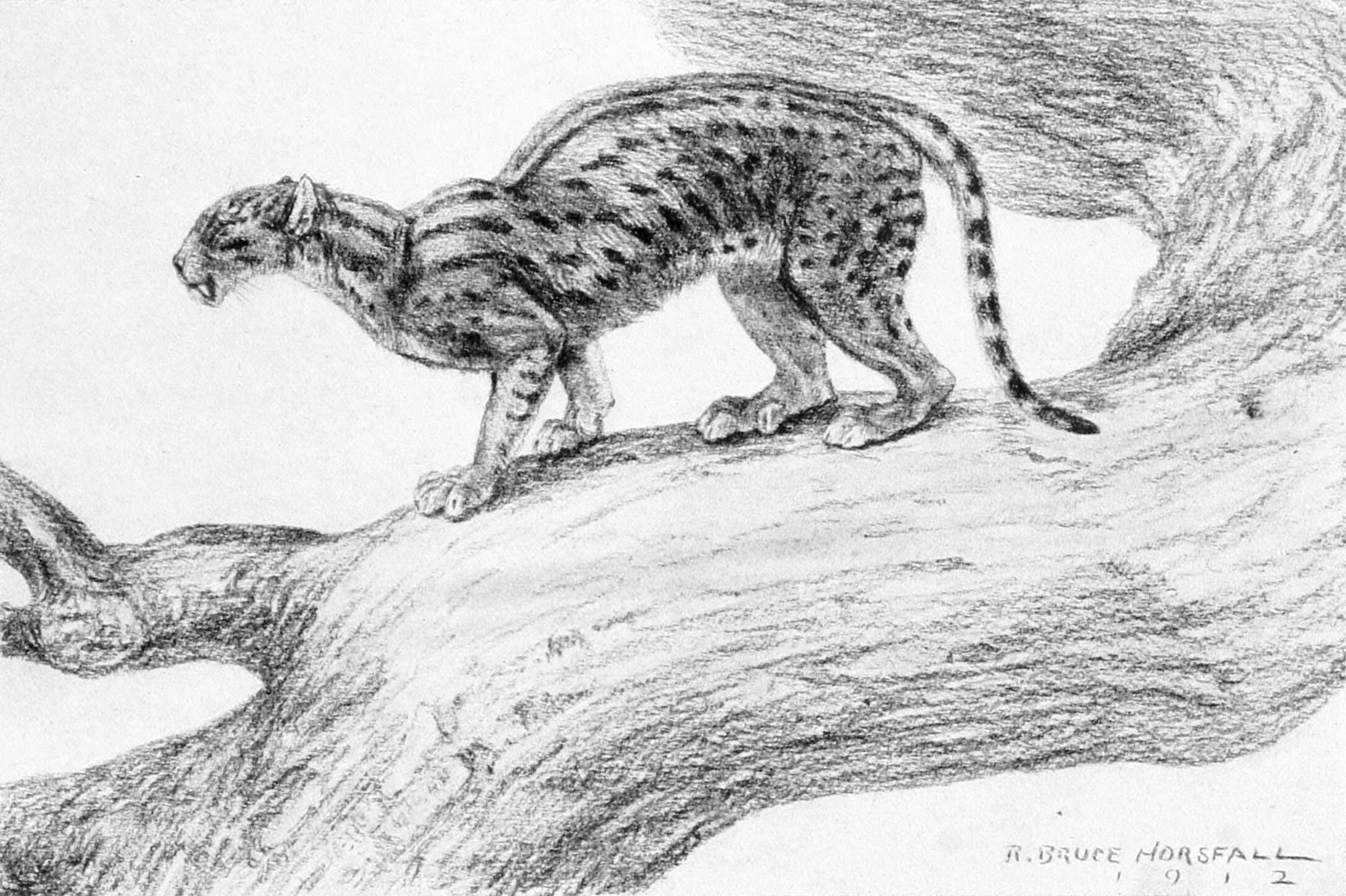
- Life restoration of the Eocene-Miocene false saber-toothed cat Dinictis. Robert Bruce Horsfall (1913).
  †Dinictis
- †Dinohippus
- †Dinohyus
  - †Dinohyus hollandi – type locality for species
- †Diospyros
- Dipodomys
- †Dipoides
- †Diprionomys
- †Domnina
- †Dromomeryx
  - †Dromomeryx borealis – type locality for species
- †Ectopocynus
- †Ekgmowechashala
  - †Ekgmowechashala philotau
- Elaphe
  - †Elaphe guttata
  - †Elaphe obsoleta
  - †Elaphe vulpina
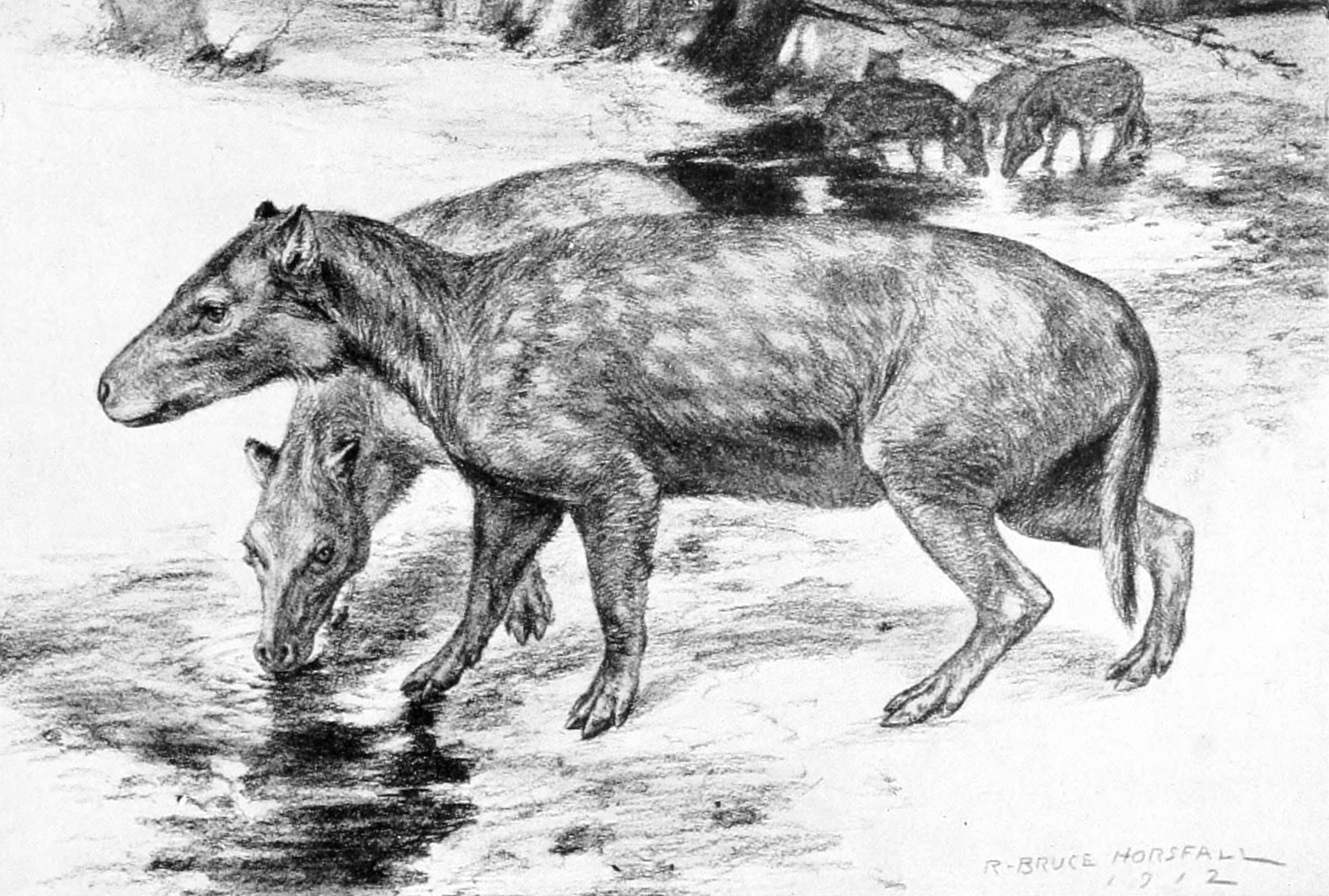
- Life restoration of the Eocene-Oligocene anthracothere mammal Elomeryx
  †Elomeryx – tentative report
- Emydoidea
  - †Emydoidea blandingii
- †Enhydrocyon
- †Epicyon
  - †Epicyon haydeni
- Equus
  - †Equus conversidens – or unidentified comparable form
  - †Equus francisci
  - †Equus simplicidens
- Erethizon
  - †Erethizon dorsatum
- Esox
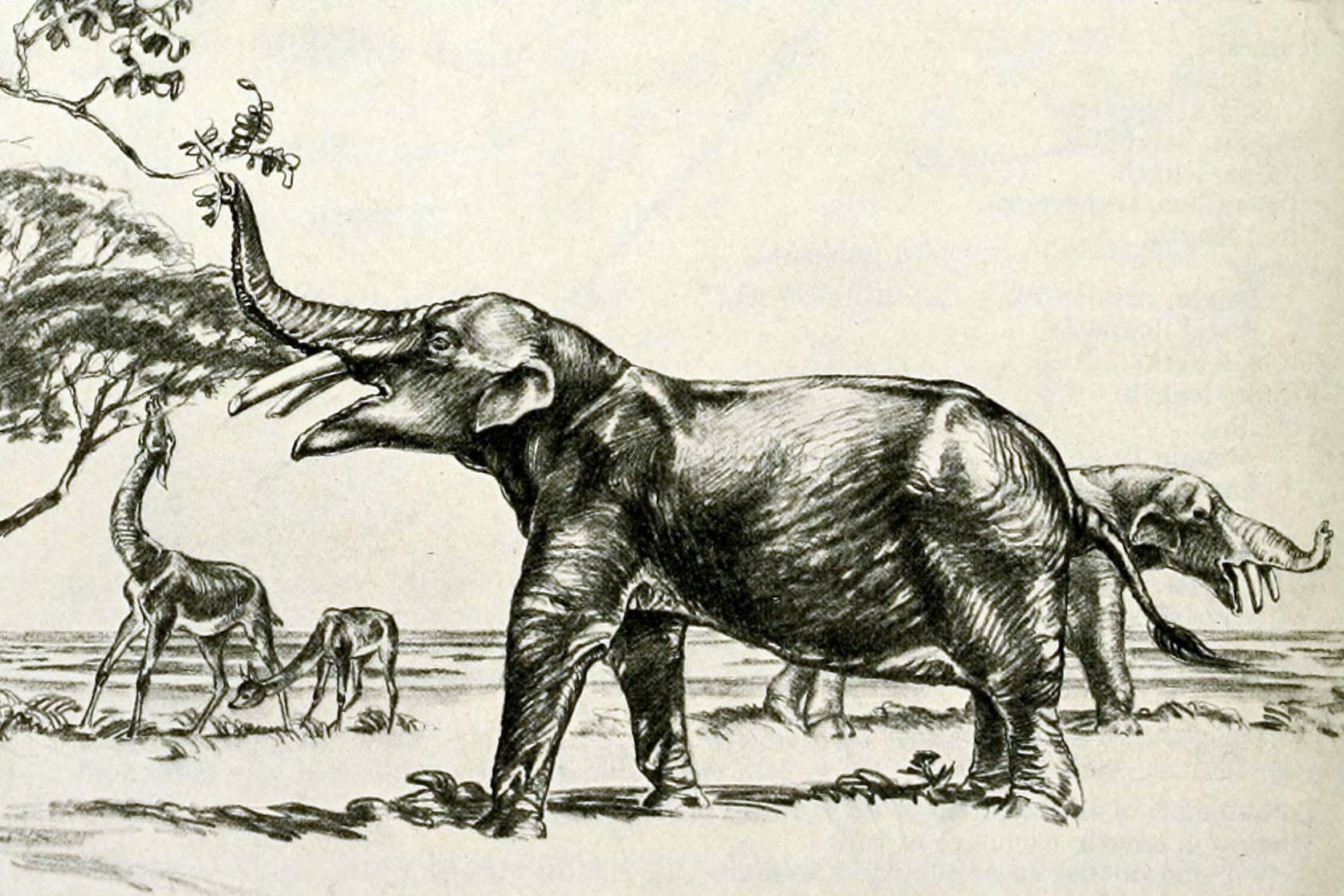
- Life restoration of the Miocene elephant relative Eubelodon
  †Eubelodon
- †Eucastor
- †Eucyon
  - †Eucyon davisi
- Eumeces
- †Euoplocyon
- Felis
- †Floridatragulus
- †Fraxinus
- †Gaillardia
- Geochelone
- Geomys
  - †Geomys bursarius
- Geranoaetus
- Gerrhonotus
- †Gigantocamelus
- Glyptemys
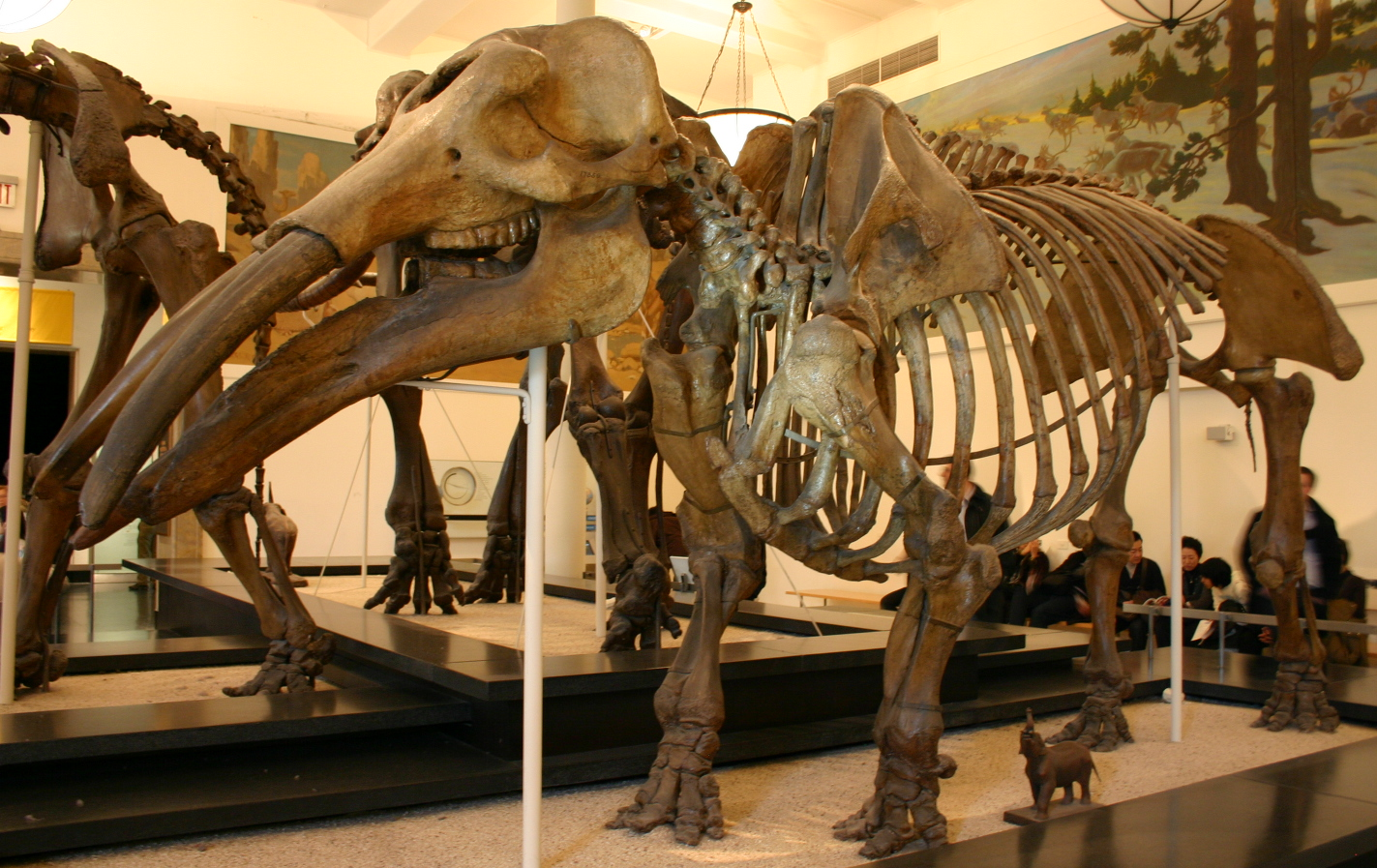
- Mounted fossilized skeleton of the Miocene-Pleistocene elephant relative Gomphotherium
  †Gomphotherium
- Gopherus
- Graptemys
- Grus
- †Hayoceros
- †Helodermoides
  - †Helodermoides tuberculatus
- †Hemiauchenia
  - †Hemiauchenia macrocephala
- †Herpetotherium
  - †Herpetotherium fugax
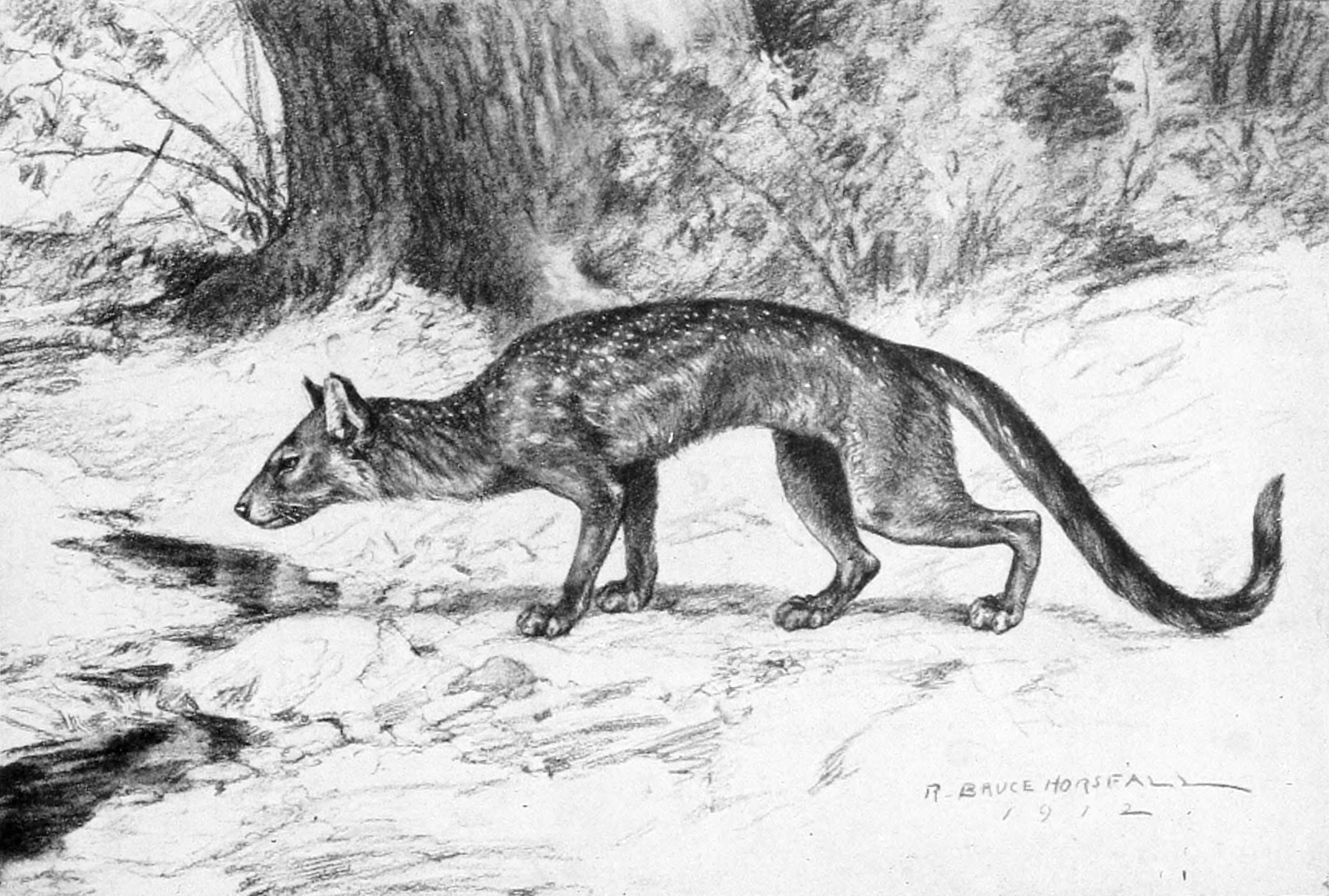
- Life restoration of the Eocene-Oligocene dog Hesperocyon. Robert Bruce Horsfall (1913).
  †Hesperocyon
- †Hesperotestudo
- Heterodon
  - †Heterodon nasicus
  - †Heterodon platyrhinos
- †Heteromeryx
- †Hipparion
  - †Hipparion forcei
- †Hippotherium
- Holbrookia – tentative report
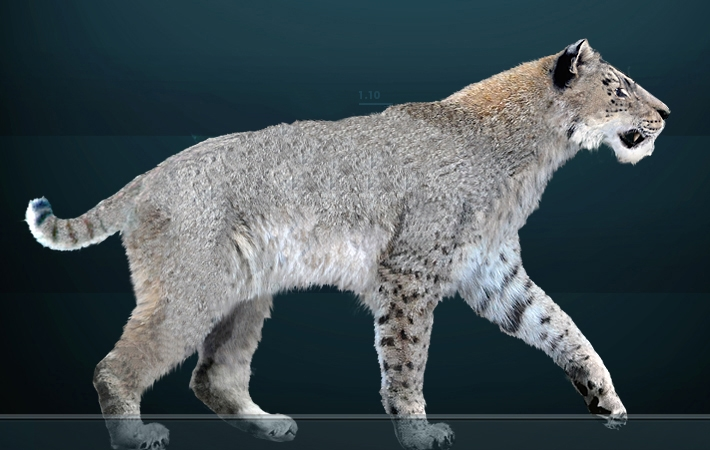
- Restoration of Pliocene-Pleistocene Homotherium, or scimitar cat
  †Homotherium
  - †Homotherium crusafonti
- †Hoplophoneus
- †Hyaenodon
  - †Hyaenodon crucians
- Hyla
  - †Hyla gratiosa – or unidentified comparable form
  - †Hyla squirella – or unidentified comparable form
  - †Hyla versicolor – or unidentified comparable form
- †Hypertragulus
- †Hypisodus
- †Hypohippus
- †Hypolagus
- †Hypsiops
- †Hyracodon
- Ictalurus
  - †Ictalurus punctatus – or unidentified comparable form
- Ilex
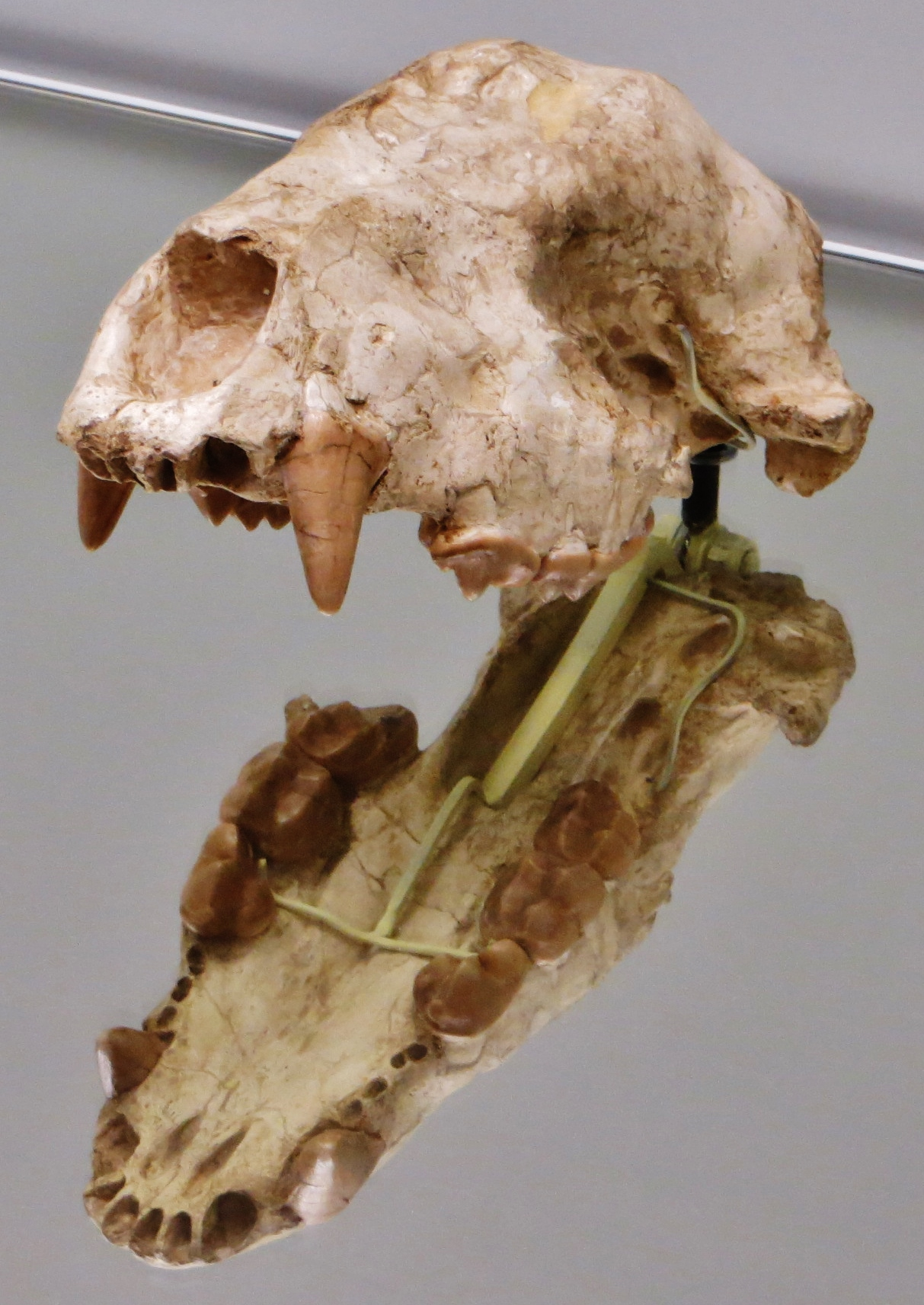
- Fossilized skull of the Miocene bear Indarctos
  †Indarctos
- †Ischyrocyon
- †Ischyromys
- Juglans
- †Kalobatippus
- Kinosternon
  - †Kinosternon flavescens
- †Lambdoceras
- Lampropeltis
  - †Lampropeltis calligaster
  - †Lampropeltis getulus
  - †Lampropeltis triangulum
- Lasiurus
- Leiocephalus
- Lepisosteus
- Lepomis
  - †Lepomis microlophus
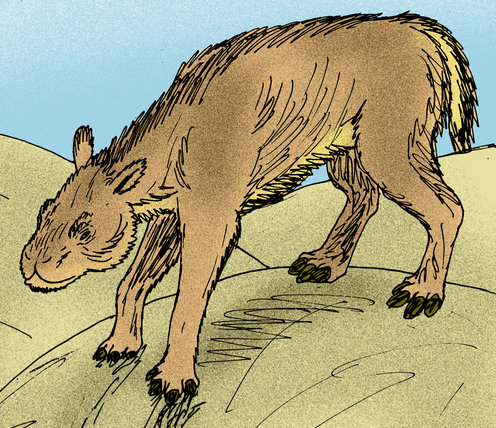
- Restoration of the Oligocene-Miocene oreodont mammal Leptauchenia
  †Leptauchenia
- †Leptocyon
- †Leptomeryx
- Lepus
  - †Lepus californicus – or unidentified comparable form
- Lichanura
- Liquidambar
- †Longirostromeryx
- Lontra
- Lycopodium
- †Machairodus
- Macrochelys
  - †Macrochelys temminckii
- Mahonia
- †Mammacyon
- †Mammut
  - †Mammut matthewi
- †Mammuthus
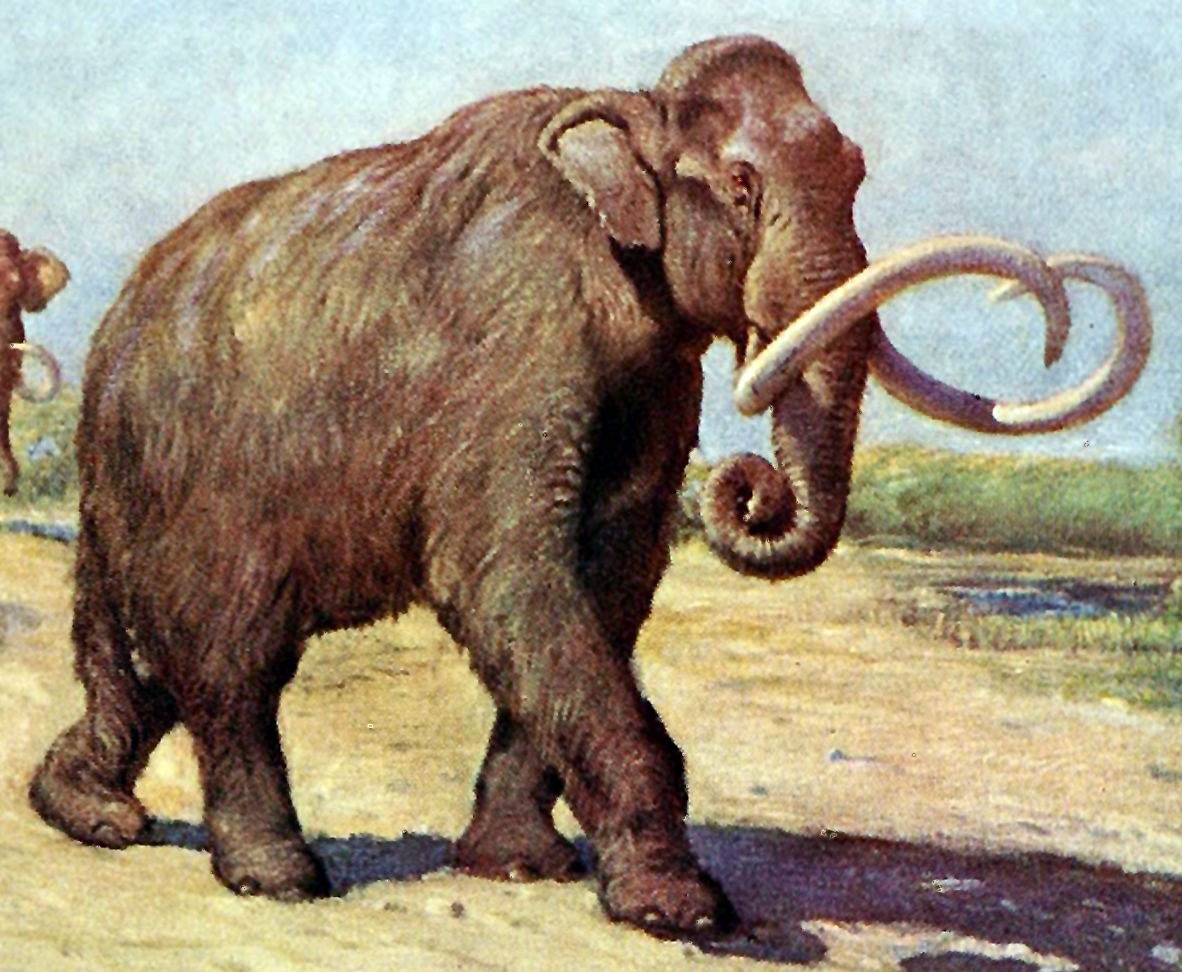
  - Life restoration of a herd of Mammuthus columbi, or Columbian mammoths. The extent of the fur depicted is hypothetical. Charles R. Knight (1909).
    †Mammuthus columbi
- Martes
- Masticophis
  - †Masticophis flagellum
- †Mediochoerus
- †Megacamelus
- †Megahippus
- †Megalictis
  - †Megalictis ferox
- †Megalonyx
  - †Megalonyx leptostomus
- †Megantereon – tentative report
- †Megatylopus
- †Meliosma
- †Menoceras
- Mephitis
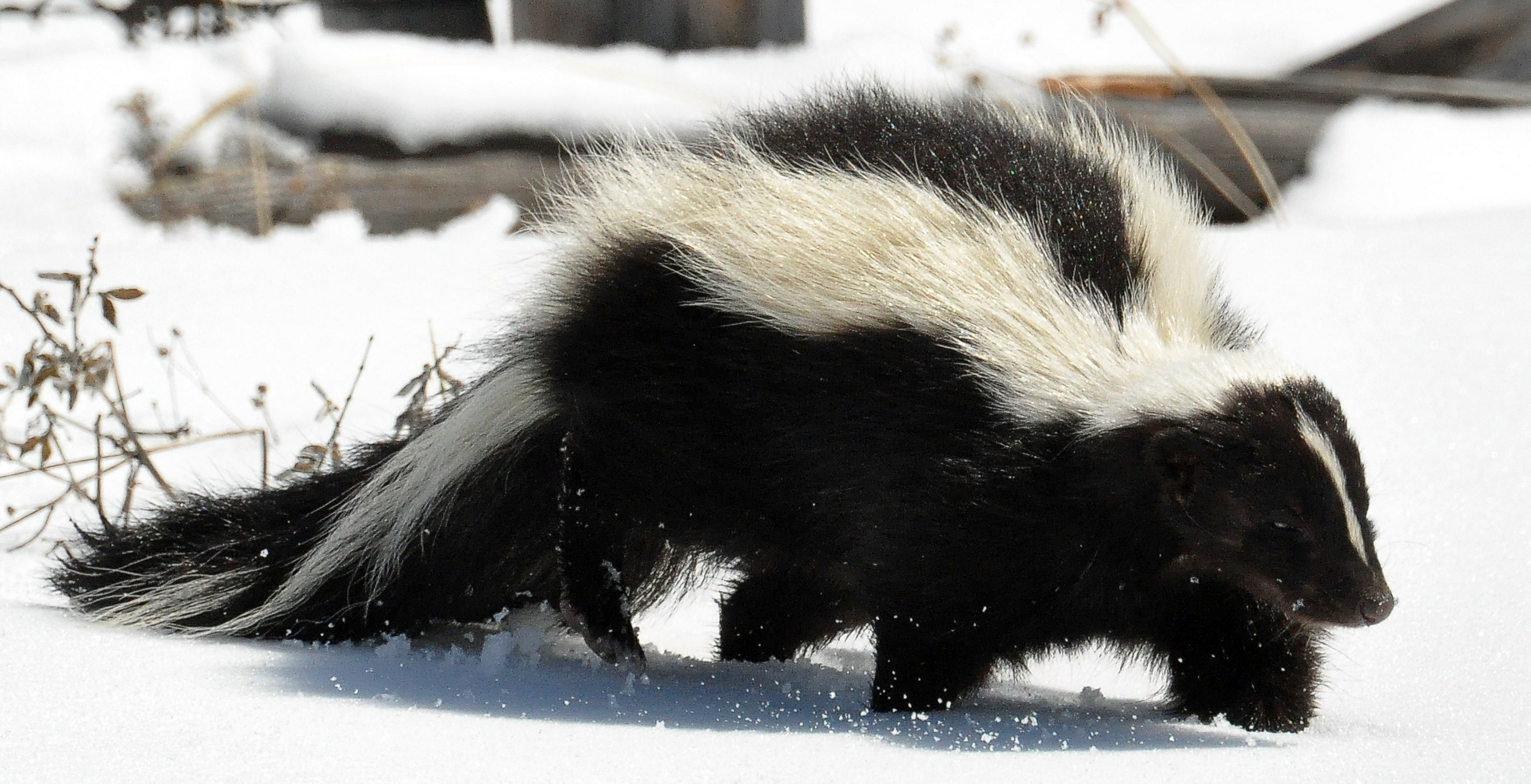
  - A living Mephitis mephitis, or striped skunk
    †Mephitis mephitis
- †Merychippus
- †Merychyus
- †Merycochoerus
- †Merycodus
- †Merycoides
- †Merycoidodon
- †Mesocyon – report made of unidentified related form or using admittedly obsolete nomenclature
- †Mesohippus
- †Mesoreodon
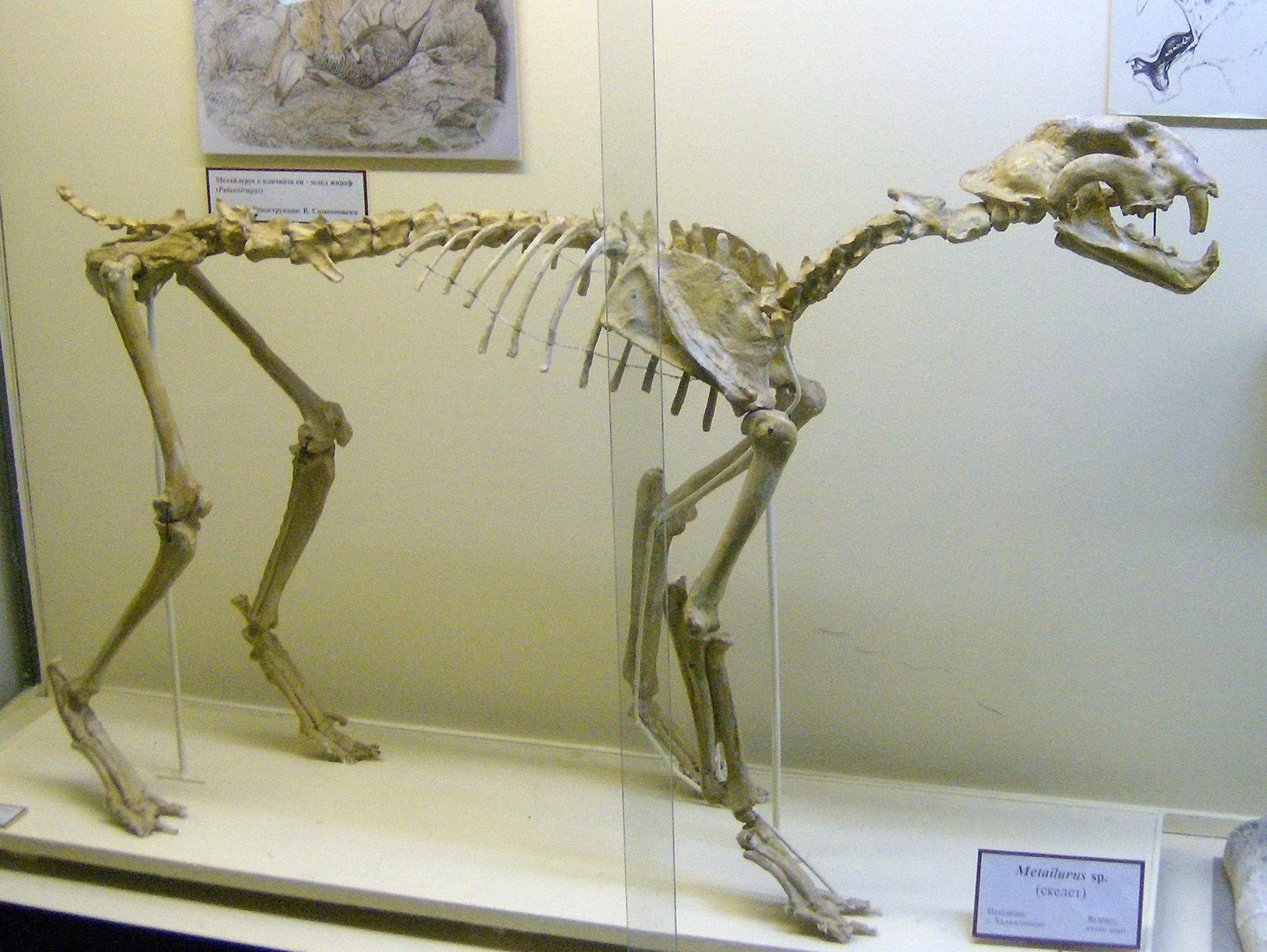
- Mounted fossilized skeleton of the Miocene-Pleistocene saber-toothed cat Metailurus
  †Metailurus
- †Metalopex
- †Metatomarctus
- †Michenia
- Micropterus
- †Microtomarctus
- Microtus
  - †Microtus ochrogaster
  - †Microtus pennsylvanicus
- Micrurus
- †Migmacastor – type locality for genus
  - †Migmacastor procumbodens – type locality for species
- †Miniochoerus
- †Miohippus
- †Miotapirus
  - †Miotapirus harrisonensis
- †Miotylopus
- †Monosaulax
- †Moropus
- Mustela
  - †Mustela frenata
  - †Mustela nigripes
  - †Mustela vison
- Mycteria
- †Mylagaulus
- †Mylohyus
- Myotis
- †Nannippus
- †Nanotragulus
- Natrix – or unidentified comparable form
- †Neohipparion
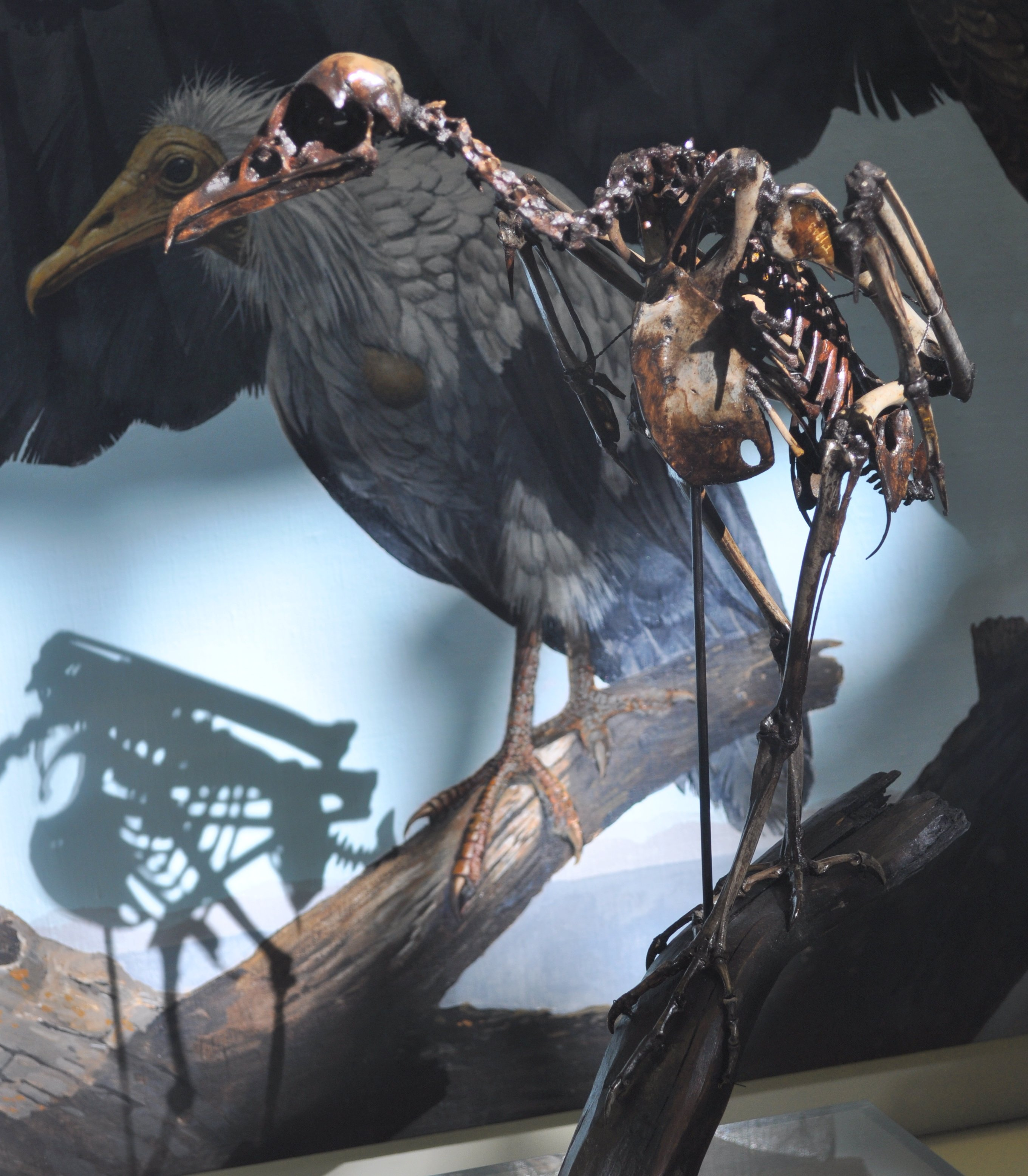
- Mounted fossilized skeleton of the Miocene Neophrontops
  Neophrontops
- Neotamias
- Neotoma
- Nerodia
  - †Nerodia rhombifera
  - †Nerodia sipedon
- †Nexuotapirus
- †Nimravides
  - †Nimravides pedionomus – type locality for species
- †Nordenosaurus
- †Nototamias
- †Nyssa
- Ochotona
  - †Ochotona spanglei – or unidentified comparable form
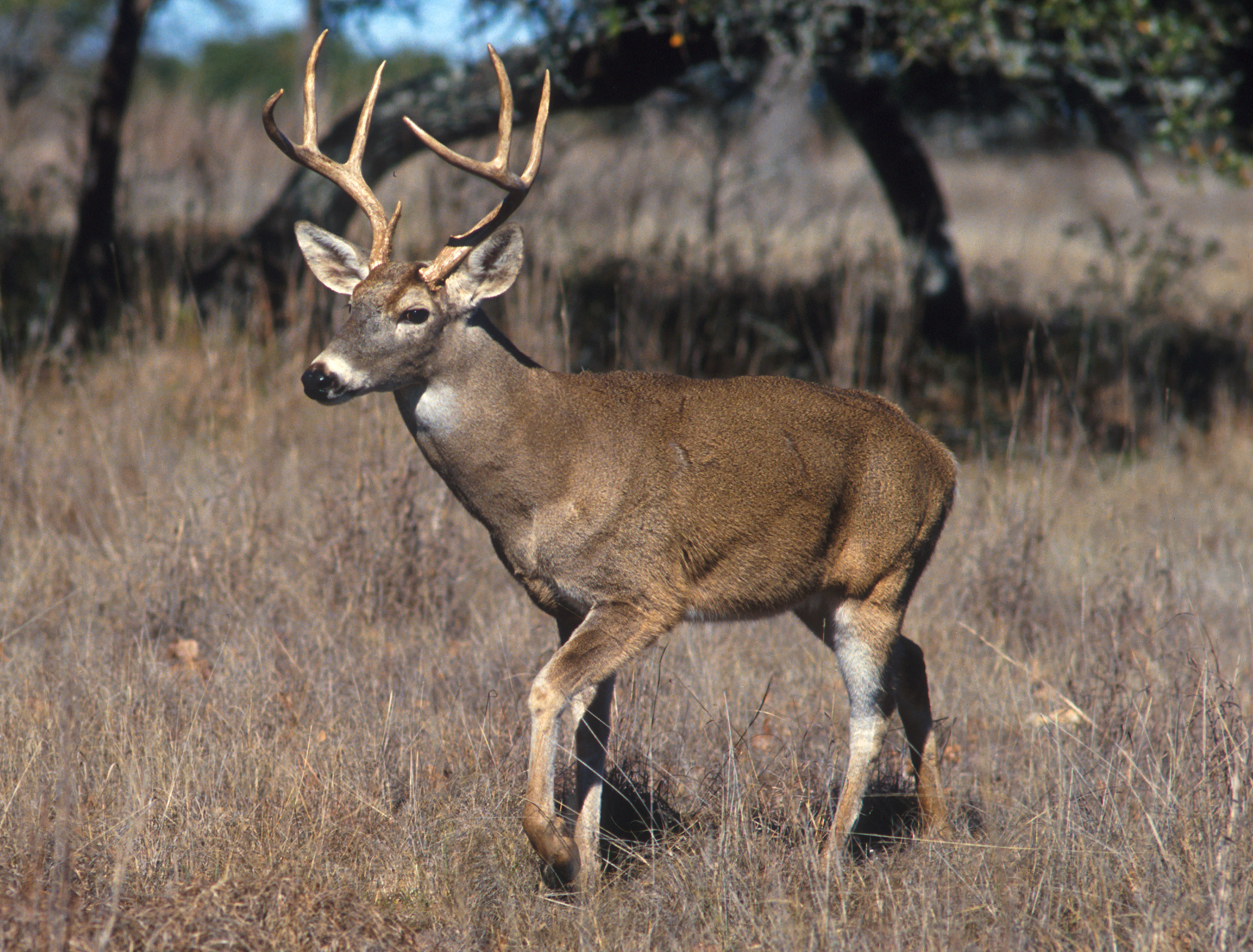
- A living Odocoileus deer
  Odocoileus
  - †Odocoileus virginianus
- †Oligobunis
- Ondatra
  - †Ondatra zibethicus
- Onychomys
  - †Onychomys leucogaster – or unidentified comparable form
- Opheodrys – or unidentified comparable form
- Ophisaurus
  - †Ophisaurus ventralis
- Ortalis
- †Osbornodon
  - †Osbornodon iamonensis
- †Oxetocyon
- †Oxydactylus
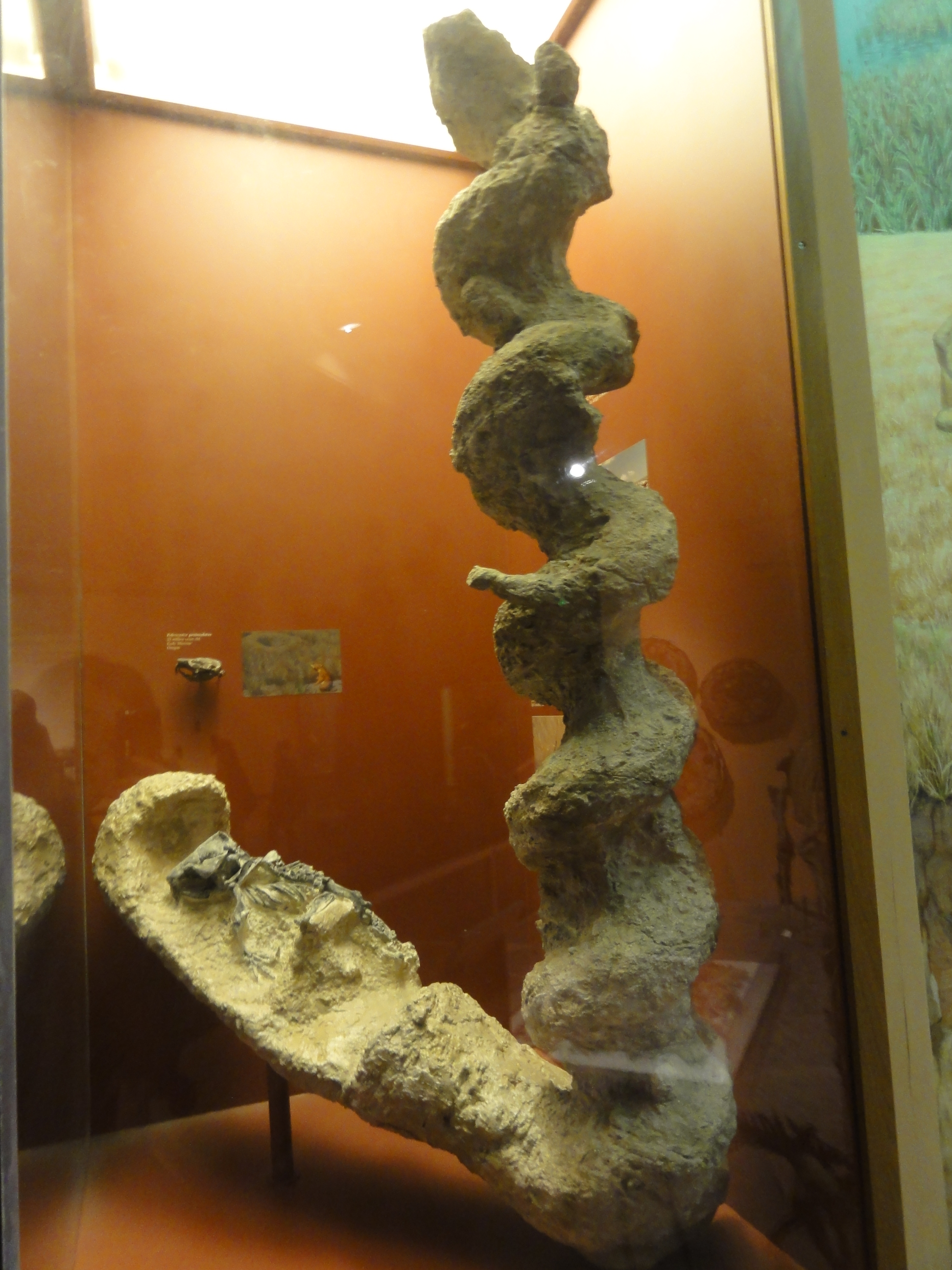
- Spiral-shaped fossilized burrow and associated skeleton of the Oligocene-Miocene beaver Palaeocastor
  †Palaeocastor
- †Palaeogale
- †Palaeolagus
- Panthera
  - †Panthera leo
- †Paracynarctus
- †Paradaphoenus
- †Paraenhydrocyon
- †Parahippus
- †Paramylodon
  - †Paramylodon harlani
- †Paramys
- Parascalops – or unidentified comparable form
- †Paratomarctus
- †Paratylopus
- †Parictis
- †Paronychomys
- †Parvitragulus – tentative report
- †Pediolophodon
- †Pediomeryx
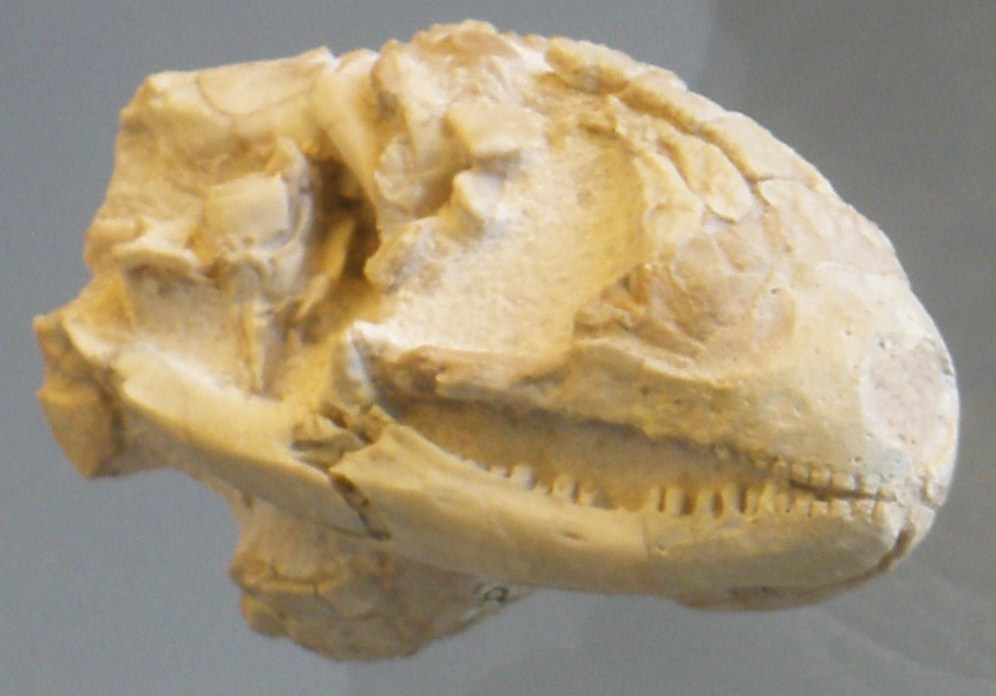
- Fossilized skull of the Eocene-Oligocene lizard Peltosaurus
  †Peltosaurus
  - †Peltosaurus granulosus
- †Peraceras
- Perognathus
- Peromyscus
- †Phasianus
- †Phenacocoelus
- Phenacomys
  - †Phenacomys intermedius – or unidentified comparable form
- †Phlaocyon
  - †Phlaocyon annectens
  - †Phlaocyon mariae – type locality for species
  - †Phlaocyon minor
  - †Phlaocyon yatkolai – type locality for species
- Phrynosoma
  - †Phrynosoma cornutum
- Picea
- Pinus
- Pituophis
  - †Pituophis catenifer
  - †Pituophis melanoleucus
- Platanus
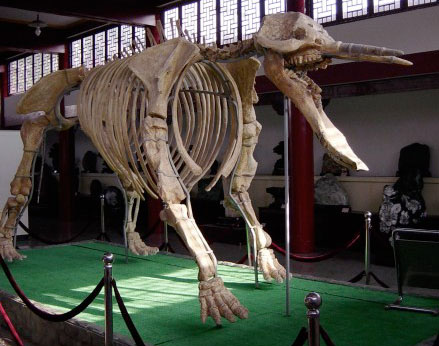
- Mounted fossilized skeleton of the Miocene elephant relative Platybelodon
  †Platybelodon
- †Platygonus
  - †Platygonus compressus
- †Pleiolama
- †Plesiogulo
- †Pliauchenia
- †Pliocyon
- †Pliohippus
- †Pliometanastes
- †Plionarctos
- †Plithocyon
- †Poebrotherium
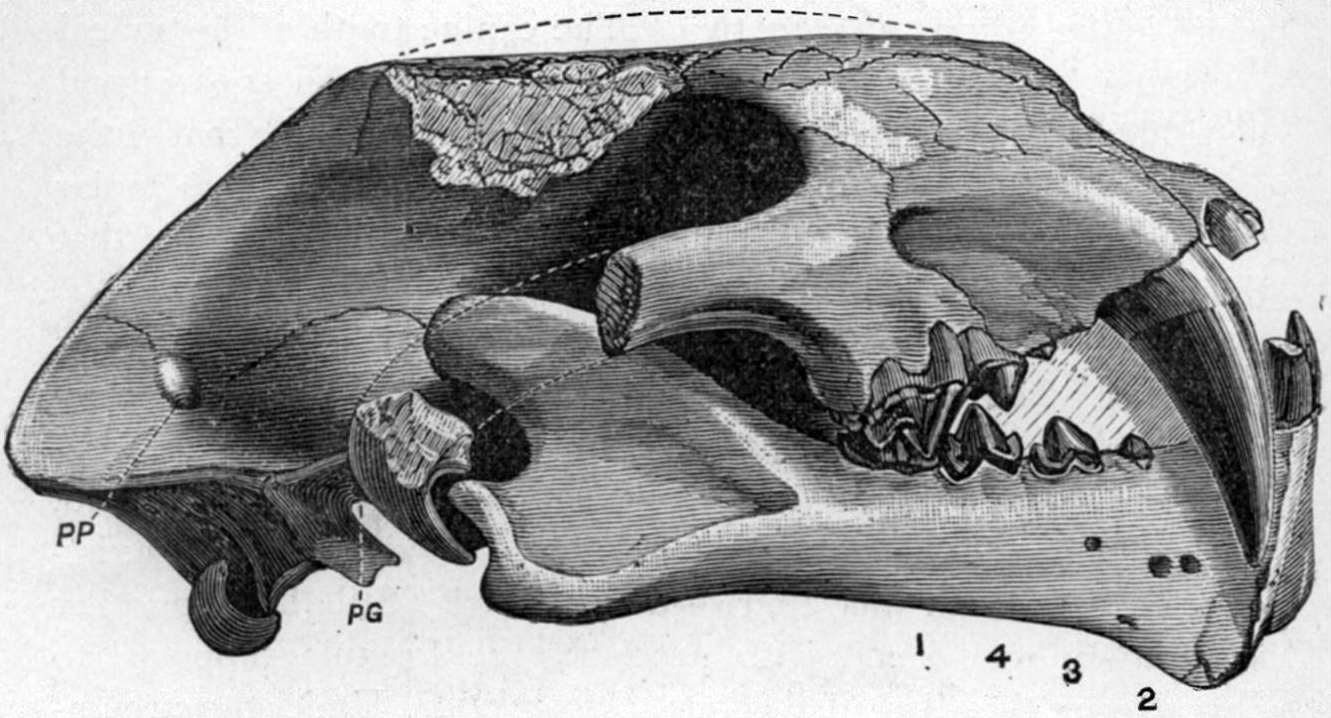
- Illustration of a fossilized skull of the Oligocene false faber-toothed cat Pogonodon
  †Pogonodon
- Populus
- †Proantilocapra
- †Procamelus
  - †Procamelus occidentalis
- †Procastoroides
- †Procranioceras
- †Promartes
- †Promerycochoerus
- †Proscalops
- †Prosynthetoceras
- †Proterix
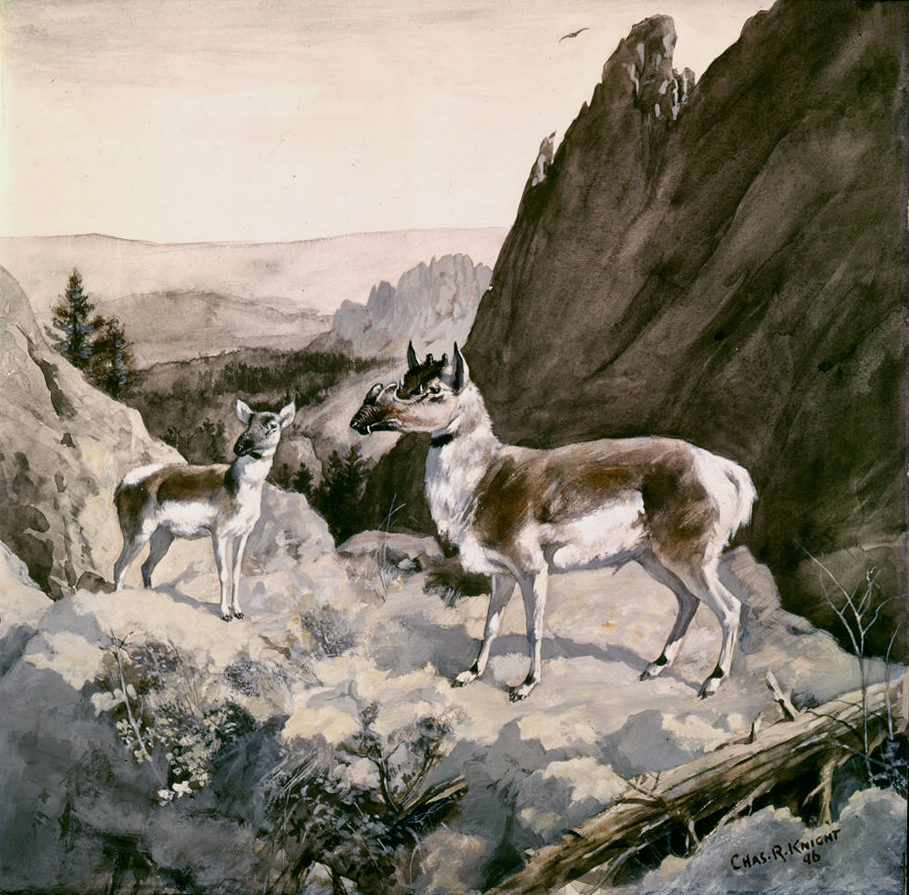
- Life restoration of a female (left) and male of the Oligocene-Miocene even-toed ungulate Protoceras. Charles R. Knight (1896).
  †Protoceras
- †Protohippus
- †Protolabis
- †Protomarctus
- Prunus
  - †Prunus acuminata – type locality for species
- †Psalidocyon
- Pseudacris
- †Pseudaelurus
- †Pseudhipparion
- †Pseudocyon
- †Pseudolabis
- †Pseudoprotoceras
- Pterocarya
- †Pylodictis
  - †Pylodictis olivaris
- Quercus
  - †Quercus parvula – type locality for species
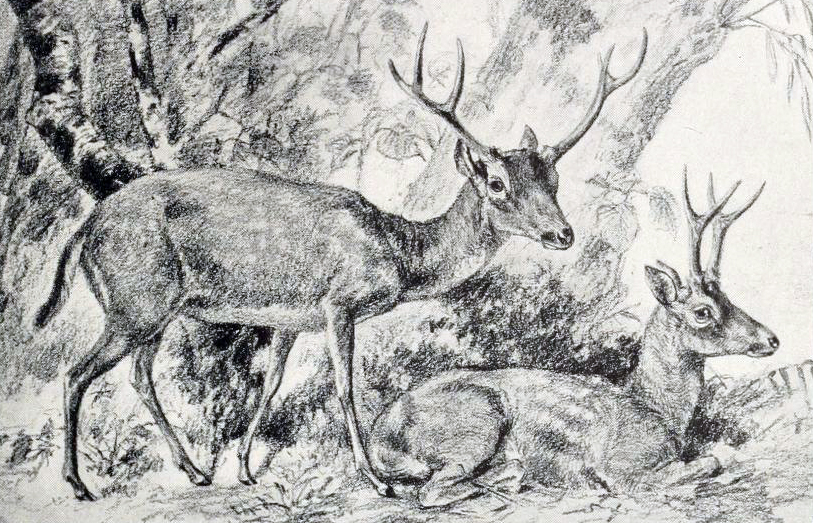
- Life restoration of the Miocene-Pliocene pronghorn Ramoceros and Cosoryx. Robert Bruce Horsfall (1913).
  †Ramoceros
- †Ramoceros
- †Rana
  - †Rana catesbeiana
  - †Rana clamitans
  - †Rana pipiens
  - †Rana sylvatica
- †Regina – or unidentified comparable form
- Reithrodontomys
- †Repomys
- Rhineura
- Rhinocheilus
  - †Rhinocheilus lecontei
- †Ribes
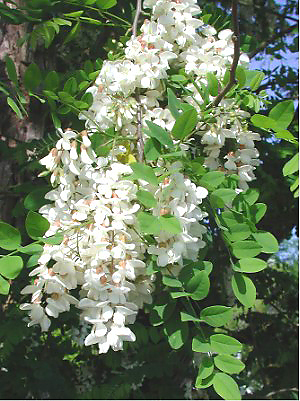
- Flowers of a living Robinia
  †Robinia
- Salix
- Salvadora
- †Sarcobatus – or unidentified comparable form
- †Satherium
  - †Satherium piscinarium
- Scalopus
  - †Scalopus aquaticus
- Scaphiopus
- †Scaphohippus
- Sceloporus
  - †Sceloporus undulatus
- Sequoia – or unidentified comparable form
- †Serbelodon
- †Sespia
- Sigmodon
- Siren
- Sistrurus
  - †Sistrurus catenatus
- †Skinnerhyus – type locality for genus
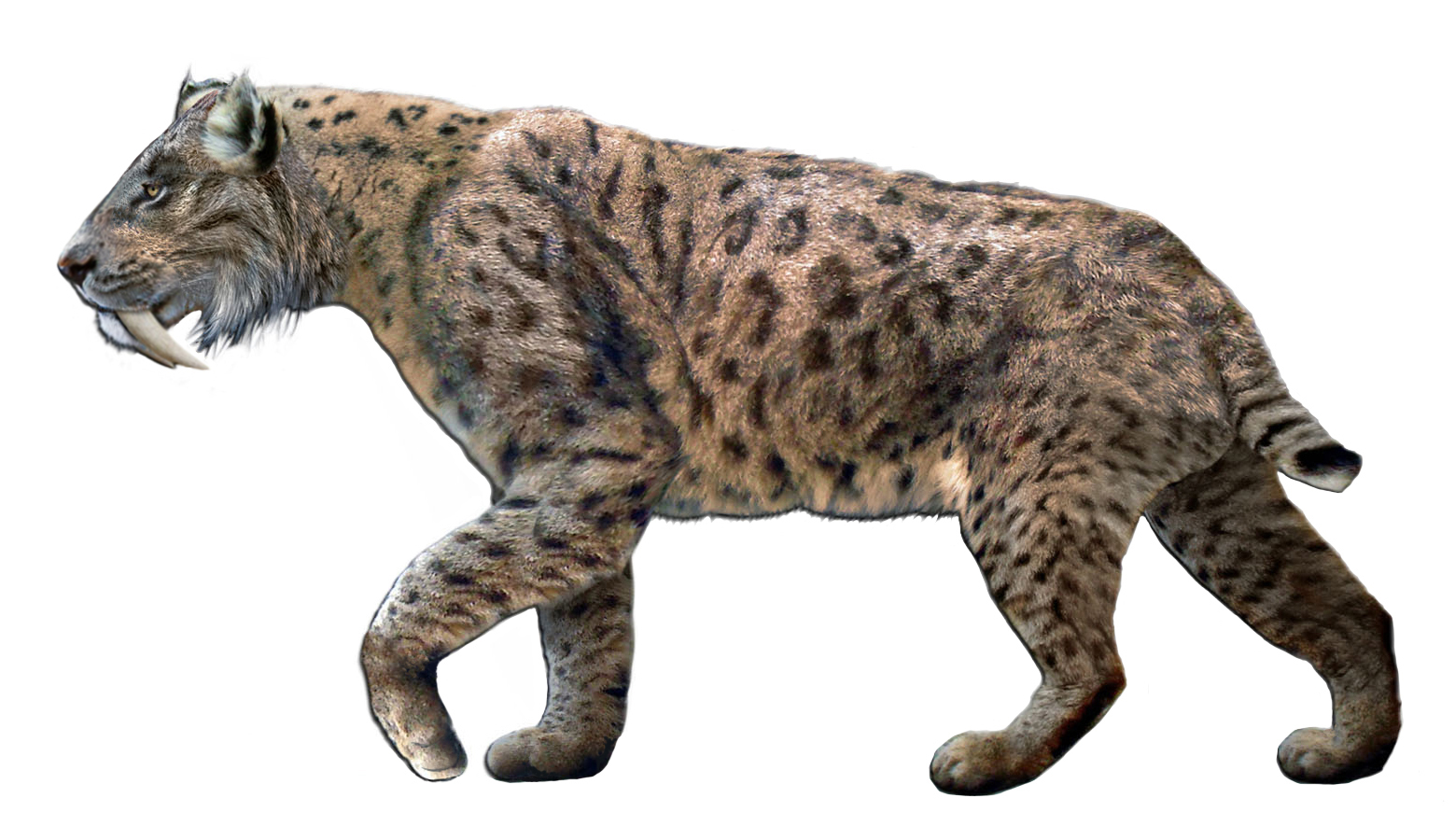
- Life restoration of the Pleistocene-Holocene saber-tooth cat Smilodon
  †Smilodon
  - †Smilodon fatalis – or unidentified comparable form
- Sorex
  - †Sorex arcticus
  - †Sorex cinereus
  - †Sorex palustris
- Spea
  - †Spea bombifrons
- Spermophilus
  - †Spermophilus elegans
  - †Spermophilus franklinii – or unidentified comparable form
  - †Spermophilus richardsonii
  - †Spermophilus tridecemlineatus
- Spizaetus
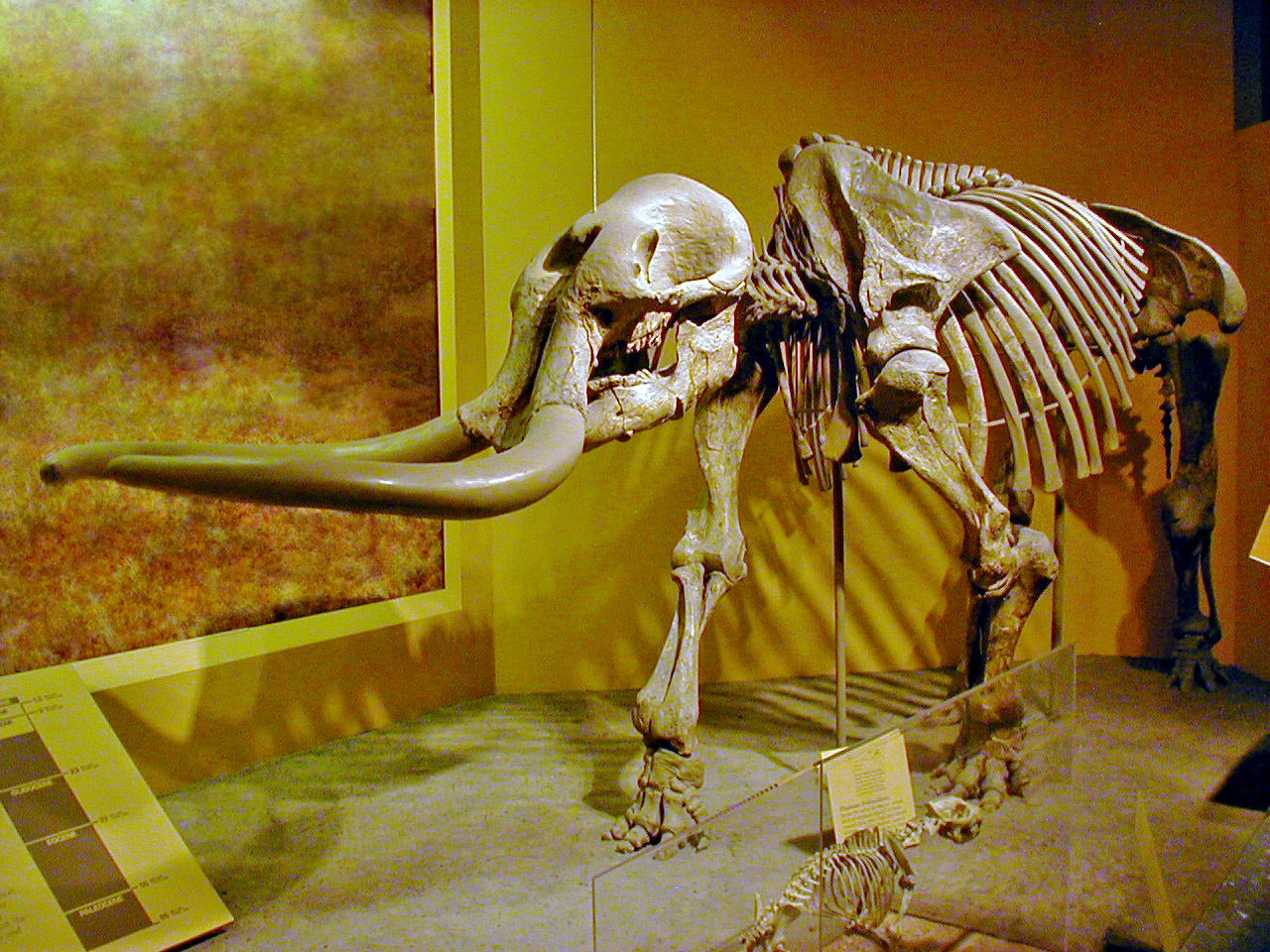
- Mounted fossilized skeleton of the Pliocene-Pleistocene elephant relative Stegomastodon
  †Stegomastodon
- †Steneofiber
- †Stenomylus
  - †Stenomylus gracilis
  - †Stenomylus hitchcocki – type locality for species
- Sthenictis
- †Stylemys
- †Subdromomeryx
  - †Subdromomeryx antilopinus
- †Subhyracodon
- †Sunkahetanka
  - †Sunkahetanka geringensis
- Sylvilagus
  - †Sylvilagus floridanus
- Synaptomys
  - †Synaptomys cooperi
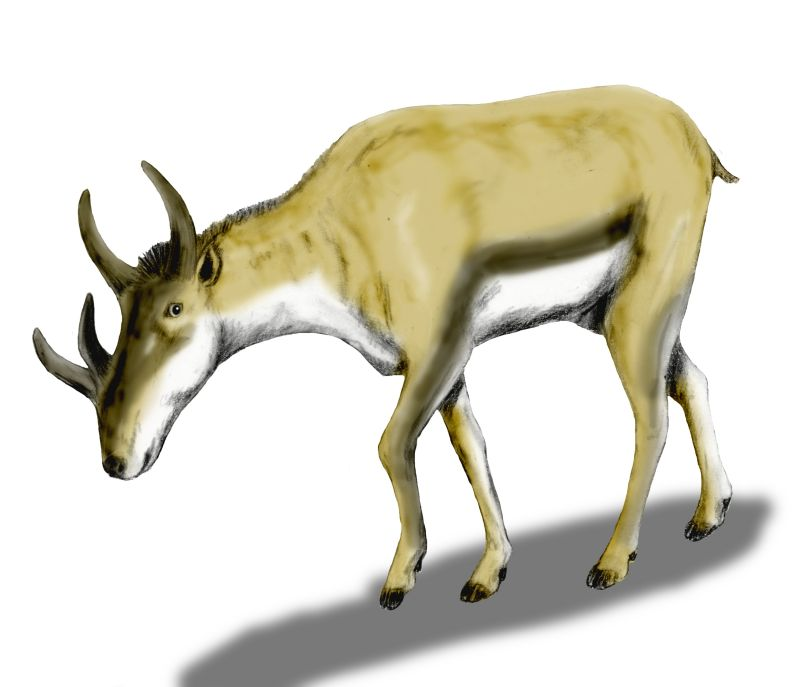
- Restoration of the Miocene protoceratid mammal Syndyoceras
  †Syndyoceras
  - †Syndyoceras cooki – type locality for species
- †Synthetoceras
  - †Synthetoceras tricornatus
- Tamias
- †Tanymykter
- Tapirus
  - †Tapirus johnsoni – type locality for species
  - †Tapirus polkensis – or unidentified comparable form
- Taxidea
  - †Taxidea taxus
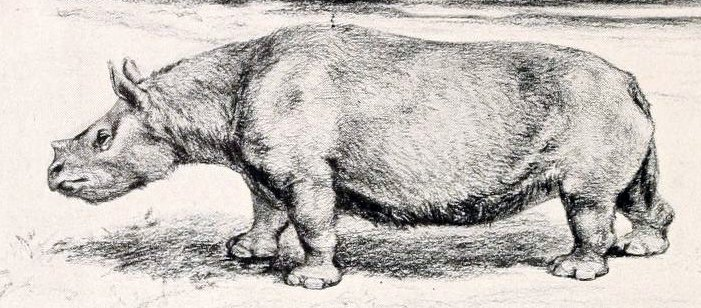
- Restoration of the Miocene-Pliocene rhinoceros Teleoceras
  †Teleoceras
  - †Teleoceras major – type locality for species
- †Temnocyon
- †Tephrocyon
- Terrapene
  - †Terrapene ornata – type locality for species
- †Tetrabelodon
- Thamnophis
  - †Thamnophis proximus
  - †Thamnophis radix
  - †Thamnophis sirtalis
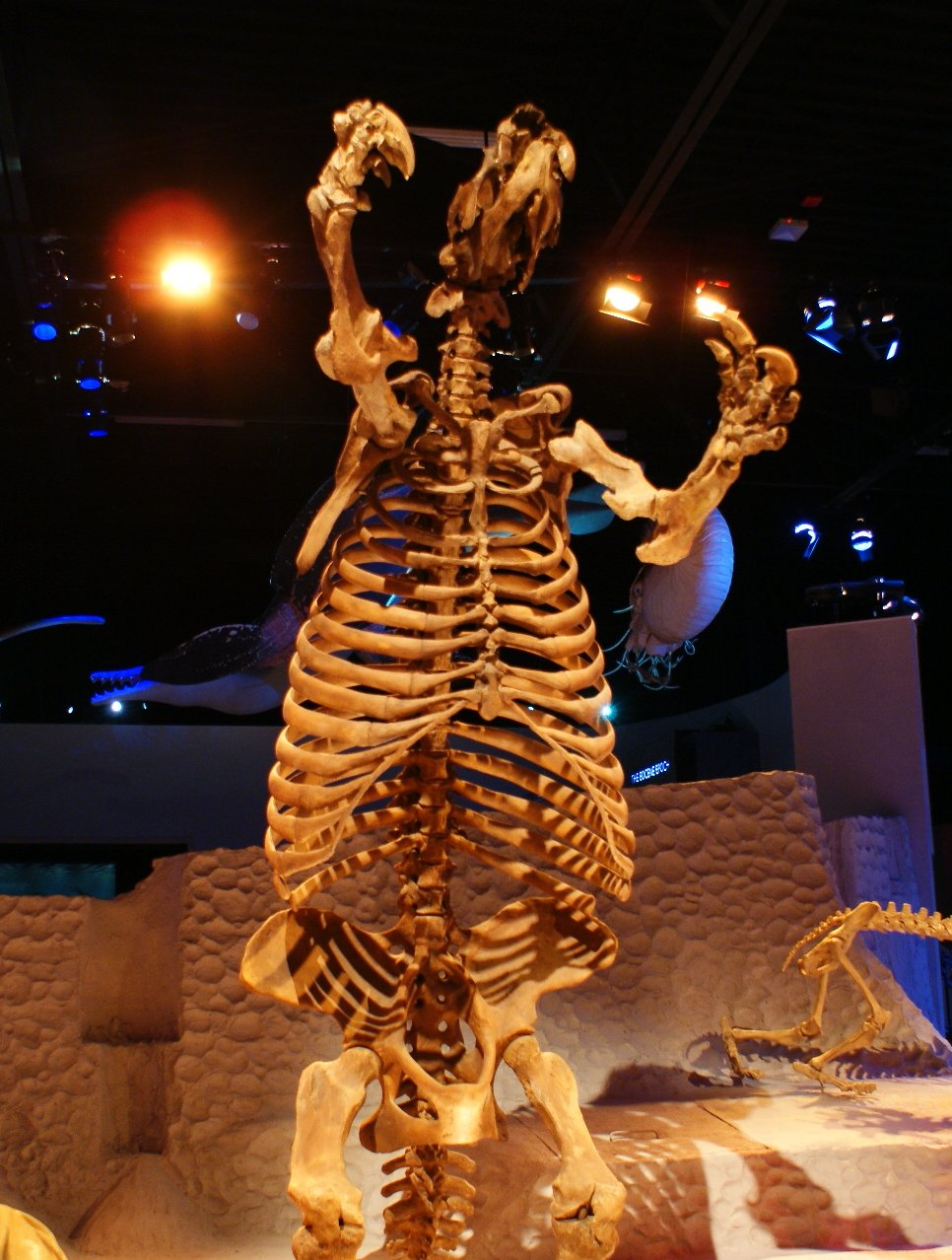
- Mounted fossilized skeleton of the Miocene-Pliocene ground sloth Thinobadistes
  †Thinobadistes
- Thomomys
- †Ticholeptus
- Tilia
- †Titanotylopus
- †Tomarctus
  - †Tomarctus brevirostris
  - †Tomarctus hippophaga – type locality for species
- Trachemys
- †Trigenicus
- †Trigonias
  - †Trigonictis macrodon
- Trionyx
- Tropidoclonion – or unidentified comparable form
- †Tylocephalonyx
- Ulmus
- Urocyon
- †Ursavus
- †Ustatochoerus
- Vitis
- Vulpes
  - †Vulpes velox
- †Ysengrinia
- †Yumaceras
- Zapus
  - †Zapus hudsonius
- †Zodiolestes
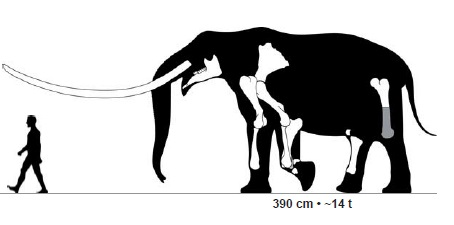
- Known material diagram depicting the Miocene-Pleistocene mastodon relative Zygolophodon with a human to scale
  †Zygolophodon
