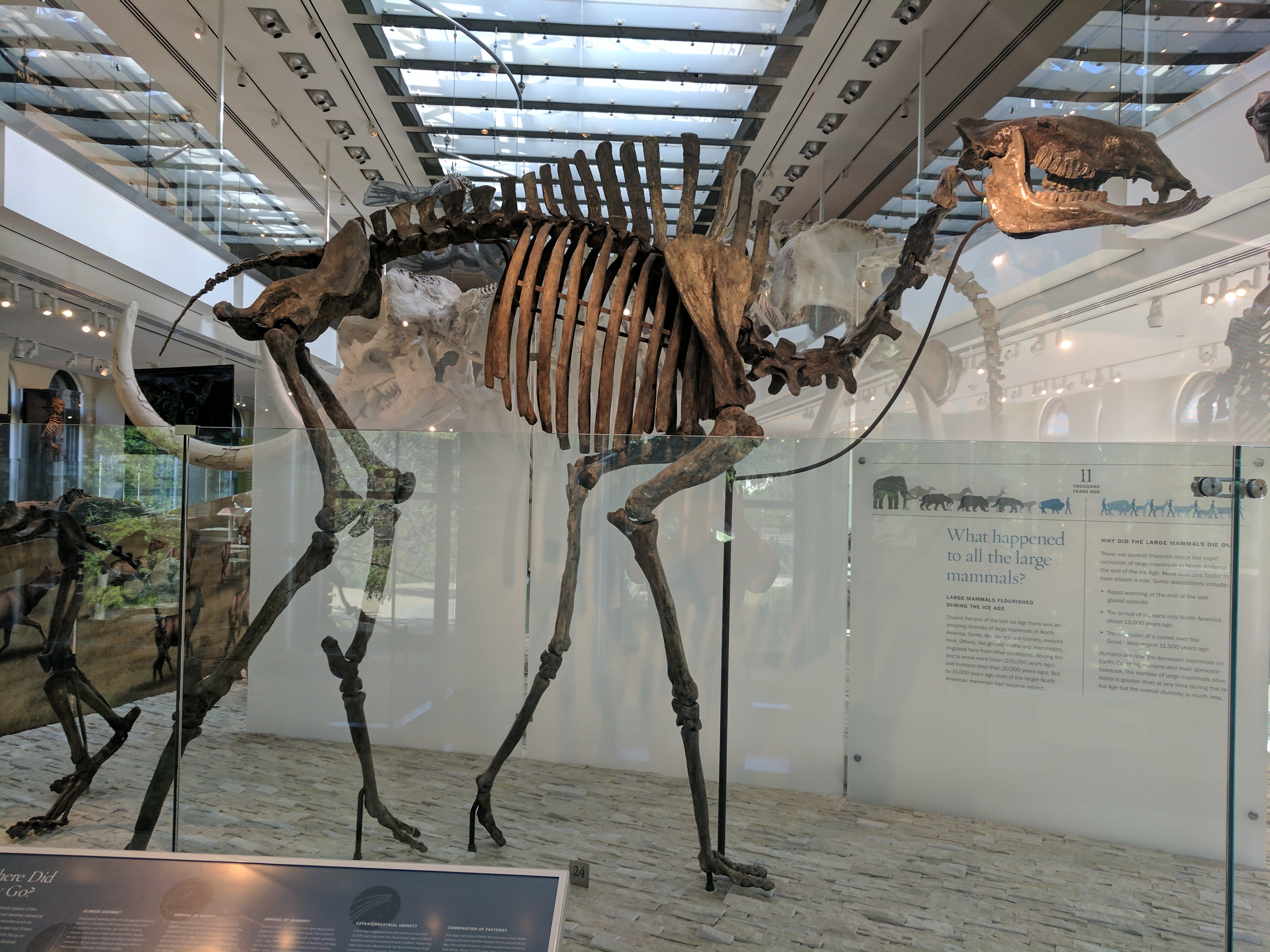
- G. spatulus skeleton at the Natural History Museum of Los Angeles County

Scientific classification
- Kingdom: Animalia
- Phylum: Chordata
- Class: Mammalia
- Order: Artiodactyla
- Family: Camelidae
- Subfamily: Camelinae
- Tribe: Camelini
- Genus: †Gigantocamelus; Barbour and Schultz, 1939
- Species: †G. spatulus

Binomial name
- †Gigantocamelus spatulus (Cope, 1893)

Synonyms
- Gigantocamelus fricki Barbour and Schultz, 1939; Titanotylopus spatulus Webb, 1965

= Gigantocamelus =

Gigantocamelus Temporal range: Pliocene - Early Pleistocene (Blancan)

Extinct genus of camels

Gigantocamelus is an extinct genus of camel (tribe Camelini) from the Blancan (Pliocene - Early Pleistocene) of North America. The type and only valid species, Gigantocamelus spatulus, has sometimes been considered a species of Titanotylopus, but many studies regard the two genera as separate.

== History ==
Illustrated holotype lower jaw of Gigantocamelus spatulus (1-2)

Cope (1893) established the species "Pliauchenia spatula" for a partial lower jaw of a large camel found at Mount Blanco in Texas. Barbour and Schultz (1939) named a new genus and species, Gigantocamelus fricki, for numerous specimens found in the Lisco Camel Quarry of Nebraska. Most later authors, starting with Meade (1945), consider G. fricki to be the same species as "P. spatula", rendering the former a junior synonym of the latter. This left the new combination G. spatulus as the valid type species of Gigantocamelus, and Cope's jaw fragment as its type specimen. Outside of the Blanco fauna and Lisco Camel Quarry, G. spatulus fossils are also common at Keefe Canyon in Kansas.

Webb (1965) and Breyer (1976) considered Gigantocamelus to be congeneric with Titanotylopus, another large camel which coexisted with it. The type species of Titanotylopus, T. nebraskensis, is a rare camelid originally named for a lower jaw. Some studies (and museum exhibits) continue to follow the classification approach of Webb and Breyer, referring to the more common and complete species as Titanotylopus spatulus.

Voorhies and Corner, based on previously unreported material of T. nebraskensis, argued that the two are indeed worthy of separate generic status. Harrison (1985) followed Voorhies and Corner in advocating the use of Titanotylopus for only T. nebraskensis, and Gigantocamelus for G. spatulus (= G. fricki). Honey et al. (1998) and Prothero et al. (2026) also supported distinction between the two genera.

== Description ==
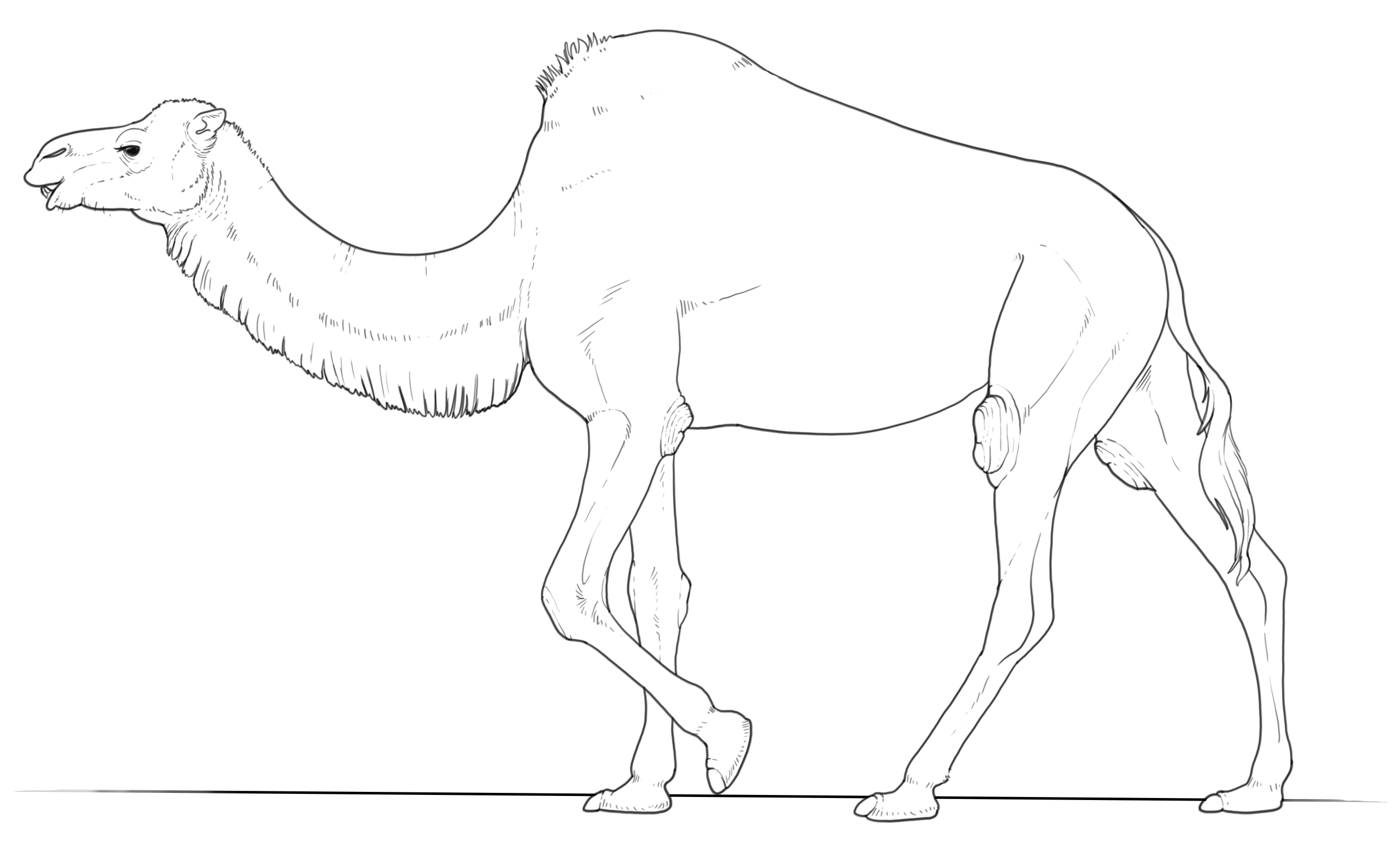
Life restoration of G. spatulus

Gigantocamelus possessed long and massive limbs, a comparatively small braincase, and a convex slope between the eyes. It reached a shoulder height of 3–3.5 m (9.8–11.5 ft) and a weight of 2,500 kg (5,500 lb). The average skull length of G. spatulus is 75 cm (30 in), with some skulls exceeding 85.5 cm (33.7 in). Gigantocamelus has large upper canines amongst other distinguishing characteristics, such as an absence of lacrimal vacuities in the skull.

The main differences between Gigantocamelus spatulus and Titanotylopus nebraskensis relate to the lower jaw. Gigantocamelus has a blunter chin (extending only slightly past the lower canine), and there is barely any diastema (gap) between the lower incisors and canine. Its lower incisors are broader and more spatulate in shape, and the incisor tooth row is straight and transverse, rather than arc-shaped. A lower first premolar (p1) is usually present.

The proportions of Gigantocamelus are close to Camelus (modern camels). The proximal phalanges (upper toe bones) of Gigantocamelus are similar to Megatylopus and Camelus, with a short, broad shaft and strong muscle scars. This may suggest that Gigantocamelus spatulus had true padded "cameltoes", like modern camels. Titanotylopus nebraskensis has longer and less muscular proximal phalanges, more akin to Camelops. There is some disagreement over whether Gigantocamelus (and/or Titanotylopus) had a hump for fat storage, like modern desert-dwelling camels.

== Distribution ==
Gigantocamelus has been found across the American West, at sites including:

- Pickstown local fauna near Delmont (South Dakota)
- Lisco, Broadwater, Sand Draw, and Big Springs local faunas (Nebraska)
- Keefe Canyon in the Rexroad Formation, Kentuck, and White Rock (Kansas)
- Holloman (Oklahoma)
- Mount Blanco, Gilliland, and the Red Light fauna of the Love Formation in Hudspeth County (Texas)
- Grand View (Idaho)
- Donnelly Ranch (Colorado)
- La Union and Simon Canyon (New Mexico)
- 111 Ranch (Arizona)
- Anza-Borrego Desert (California)

== See also ==
- Aepycamelus
- Megacamelus
- Oxydactylus
- Poebrotherium
- Procamelus
- Protylopus
- Stenomylus
- Pleistocene megafauna
