= Nothokemadinae =

Nothokemadinae Temporal range: 26.8–16.0 Ma Oligocene – Lower Miocene

Scientific classification
- Kingdom: Animalia
- Phylum: Chordata
- Class: Mammalia
- Order: Artiodactyla
- Family: Camelidae
- Subfamily: †Nothokemadinae; White, 1947

Type genus
- †Nothokemas

Genera
- †Gentilicamelus; †Nothokemas

Extinct subfamily of camelids

Nothokemadinae is an extinct subfamily of Camelidae that was endemic to North America, ranging from the Oligocene to the lower Miocene. These primitive early camelids comprised two genera: Gentilicamelus and Nothokemas. These two genera share a large mandibular angle, a downturned rostrum and symphysis, strong ribs and styles on the upper molars, and closely appressed first premolar roots. They are more derived than the basal extinct subfamilies Stenomylinae and Floridatragulinae, but less derived than the higher clade of camelids, which includes the extinct subfamilies Miolabinae and Protolabinae, as well as the extant subfamily Camelinae.
