= Hesperocamelus =

Hesperocamelus Temporal range: Miocene

Scientific classification
- Kingdom: Animalia
- Phylum: Chordata
- Class: Mammalia
- Order: Artiodactyla
- Family: Camelidae
- Tribe: Camelini
- Genus: †Hesperocamelus; MacDonald, 1949

Species
- H. stylodon

Extinct genus of mammals

Hesperocamelus is an extinct genus of terrestrial herbivore in the family Camelidae, endemic to North America from the Miocene.

Fossil distribution of H. stylodon, the only species known as of 2026, is restricted to Nevada and California.

== Taxonomy ==
Hesperocamelus was named by Macdonald (1949). It was assigned to Camelidae by Macdonald (1949) and Carroll (1988). Its name comes from the Ancient Greek: ἕσπερος (hésperos, "western") and κάμηλος (kámelos, "camel"), Latinised.

While it was traditionally placed with the typical camels in tribe Camelini of subfamily Camelinae, some more recent authors have allied it with Aepycamelus of the llama tribe Lamini. A 2026 review found Hesperocamelus to be insufficiently known to resolve this question.
