= Titanotylopus =

Titanotylopus Temporal range: Blancan

Scientific classification
- Kingdom: Animalia
- Phylum: Chordata
- Class: Mammalia
- Order: Artiodactyla
- Family: Camelidae
- Tribe: Camelini
- Genus: †Titanotylopus; Barbour & Schultz, 1934

Type species
- Titanotylopus nebraskensis Barbour & Schultz, 1934

Synonyms
- Gigantocamelus?

Extinct genus of mammals

Titanotylopus is an extinct genus of camel (tribe Camelini), endemic to North America during the Blancan stage (Pliocene - early Pleistocene. The type species, Titanotylopus nebraskensis, is a rare component of fossil faunas on the Great Plains and only known from fragmentary remains. A potential second species, T. spatulus, is more common and complete, but it is usually classified as a separate genus, Gigantocamelus. Most museum specimens labelled as Titanotylopus actually represent G. spatulus.

== History ==
Titanotylopus nebraskensis was named by Barbour and Schultz (1934) for a lower jaw from the Red Cloud locality in Webster County, Nebraska. The generic name, Titanotylopus, is derived from the Greek words Τιτάν, τύλος and πούς — "Titan", "knob" and "foot";, respectively, thus, "giant knobby-foot".

Further fragments, including partial maxillae and limb bones, are known from the Broadwater Formation of Morrill County, Nebraska, and the Bon Homme Gravel Formation of Yankton County, South Dakota. It has also been reported from the Palm Springs Formation of California and the 111 Ranch local fauna of Arizona. All of these sites are from the Blancan NALMA. Supposed older (Hemphillian) and younger (Irvingtonian) fossils are probably misidentified.

== Description ==
The main differences between Titanotylopus nebraskensis and Gigantocamelus spatulus relate to the lower jaw. Titanotylopus has a longer and narrower chin (extending far past the lower canine), with a notable diastema (gap) between the lower incisors and canine. Its lower incisors are less spatulate and the lower canine is less splayed. A lower first premolar (p1) is absent.

Previously-undescribed postcranial fossils show that Titanotylopus nebraskensis has long proximal phalanges (upper toe bones) with weakly-developed muscle scars, similar to Camelops. In contrast, the proximal phalanges of Gigantocamelus spatulus are more similar to Megatylopus and Camelus (modern camels), with a short, broad shaft and strong muscle scars.

== See also ==
- Aepycamelus
- Megacamelus
- Oxydactylus
- Poebrotherium
- Procamelus
- Protylopus
- Stenomylus
- Pleistocene megafauna
