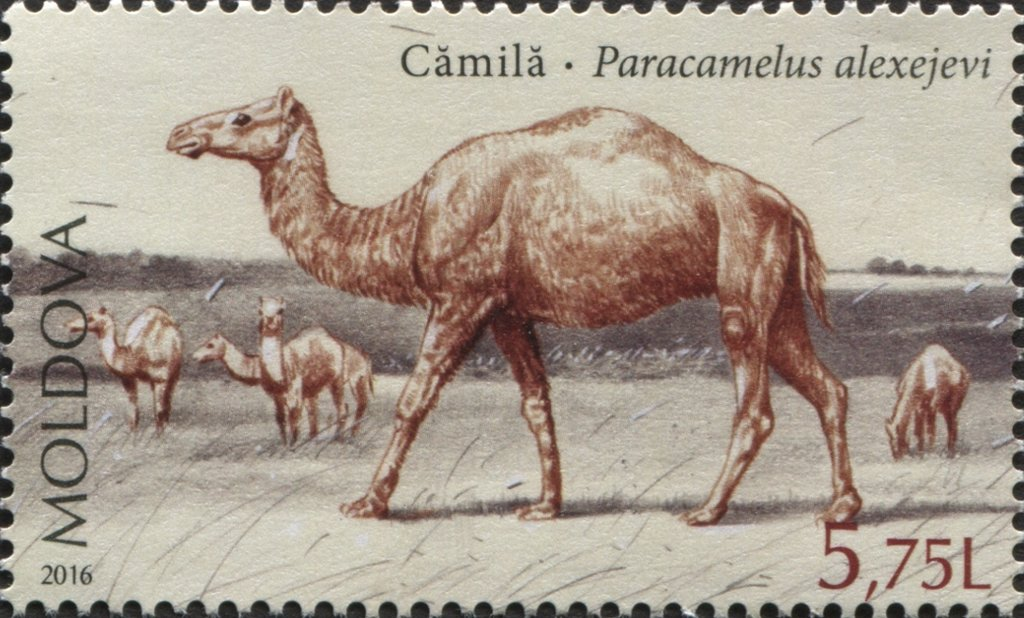
- Restoration of Paracamelus alexejevi on a 2016 stamp of Moldova.

Scientific classification
- Kingdom: Animalia
- Phylum: Chordata
- Class: Mammalia
- Infraclass: Placentalia
- Order: Artiodactyla
- Family: Camelidae
- Tribe: Camelini
- Genus: †Paracamelus; Schlosser, 1903

Type species
- †Paracamelus gigas Schlosser, 1903

Species
- P. aguirrei Morales, 1984; P. alexejevi Khavesson, 1950; P. alutensis Stefanescu, 1895; P. gigas Schlosser, 1903; P. khersonensis Pavlow, 1903; P. longipes Aubekerova, 1974; P. minor Logvynenko, 2001; P. praebactrianus Orlov, 1927; P. trofimovi Sharapov, 1986; P. qiui Liu, Hou & Zhang, 2023

= Paracamelus =

Paracamelus Temporal range: ~Late Miocene–Early Pleistocene (descendant taxon Camelus survives to present)

Extinct genus of mammals

Paracamelus is an extinct genus of camel in the family Camelidae. It originated in North America and crossed the Beringian land bridge into Eurasia during the Late Miocene, about 6 million years ago (Ma). It is the presumed ancestor to living camels of the genus Camelus.

== Taxonomy ==
Paracamelus was named by Schlosser (1903). Its type is Paracamelus gigas. P. gigas is known from the late Pliocene of China, while P. alutensis is known from the Plio-Pleistocene of Eastern Europe, P. alexejevi is known from Early Pliocene of Ukraine and P. aguirrei is known from the Early Messinian of Spain.

== Evolutionary history ==
The closest relative of Paracamelus is disputed, with authors variously suggesting Megacamelus, Procamelus, and Megatylopus as likely candidates. During the latest Miocene around 6 million years ago, the genus spread to Eurasia across the Bering land bridge, arriving in Spain just prior to the Messinian Salinity Crisis at approximately 6 Ma, with the earliest fossils in Africa around the Miocene-Pliocene boundary, approximately 5.3 million years ago, though they may have dispersed into the region somewhat earlier. Paracamelus is the presumed ancestor of modern Camelus. Camelus is distinguished from Paracamelus by the loss of the lower third premolar. Fragmentary remains of camels, referred to as cf. Paracamelus, are known from Ellesmere Island in the Arctic Circle in the far north of North America, dating to the Pliocene, around 3.4 million years old, when global temperatures were around 2-3 °C warmer than present, with the local environment being a boreal forest. These camels may have survived in the region into the Early Pleistocene based on poorly dated fossils found in Yukon. The close relationship between these high Arctic and Yukon camels and modern Camelus has been confirmed by analysis of their collagen sequences.
