= North American camel =

North American camel may refer to:

- Camelini, a tribe of mammals with several prehistoric genera which lived in North America, including:
  - Camelops
  - Megatylopus
