= Eulamaops =

Eulamaops Temporal range: Mid-Late Pleistocene (Lujanian) ~0.718–0.012 Ma

Scientific classification
- Kingdom: Animalia
- Phylum: Chordata
- Class: Mammalia
- Order: Artiodactyla
- Family: Camelidae
- Subfamily: Camelinae
- Tribe: Camelini
- Genus: †Eulamaops; Ameghino, 1889

Species
- E. paralellus

Extinct genus of mammals

Eulamaops is an extinct genus of camelid belonging to the tribe Lamini, endemic to South America during the Pleistocene (Lujanian, 781,000—12,000 years ago), existing about 0.769 million years. Fossil remains of Eulamaops have been found in the Luján Formation in Argentina in areas that would have been open grass and shrub land. It is estimated to have weighed 150 kilograms.

== Taxonomy ==
Eulamaops was named by Ameghino (1889). It was assigned to the Camelidae by Carroll (1988).
