= Pleiolama =

Pleiolama Temporal range: Pliocene

Scientific classification
- Kingdom: Animalia
- Phylum: Chordata
- Class: Mammalia
- Order: Artiodactyla
- Family: Camelidae
- Subfamily: Camelinae
- Tribe: Lamini
- Genus: †Pleiolama; Webb and Meachen 2004

Species
- P. magnifontis; P. mckennai; P. raki; P. vera

Synonyms
- see text

Extinct genus of mammals

Pleiolama is an extinct genus of terrestrial herbivore in the family Camelidae, endemic to North America during the Pliocene.

Fossil distribution ranges from southern and north-central United States to Mexico.

== Taxonomy ==
The members of genus Pleiolama were originally included in Pliauchenia, established by Edward Drinker Cope in 1875. His type species, Pliauchenia humphreysiana, was represented by a worn and broken lower jaw bone, and while it most likely was from Santa Fe County, New Mexico, its exact provenance (and age) is unresolved. Subsequently, the genus Pliauchenia was used as a "wastebasket taxon" to contain any North American camelid that was not unequivocally Procamelus; it is thus considered a nomen dubium by modern authors. After some species placed there had been moved elsewhere, Pleiolama was finally established in 2004 to contain the diagnosable species which still remained in the "Pliauchenia" assemblage.

Other than "P."humphreysiana, only "Pliauchenia" vulcanorum, also described by Cope in 1875, still remains unassigned to an undisputed genus, because it is also only based on a fragmentary specimen from an unclear locality. However, it is represented by an upper jawbone piece and thus cannot be compared (or, in fact, assigned) to the same genus as "P."humphreysiana. Most likely – but not certainly – collected from near Pojoaque Pueblo, "P."vulcanorum represents a species of Aepycamelus or Procamelus, perhaps A.giraffinus or P.occidentalis.
