= Protolabinae =

Protolabinae Temporal range: 18.8–9 Ma Late Arikareean – Early Hemphillian

Scientific classification
- Kingdom: Animalia
- Phylum: Chordata
- Class: Mammalia
- Order: Artiodactyla
- Family: Camelidae
- Subfamily: †Protolabinae; Zittel, 1893

Type genus
- †Protolabis

Genera
- †Michenia; †Protolabis; †Tanymykter

Extinct subfamily of camelids

The protolabines are an extinct subfamily of North American camelids that lived from the late Arikareean up until the early Hemphillian. These include the genera Michenia, Protolabis, and Tanymykter. They can be distinguished from other camelid lineages by a distinctively long rostrum pinched at the base between the canine and first premolar teeth, a strong buccinator fossa, lateral expansion of the anterior nares, and shortened metapodials. Of all the extinct subfamilies, Protolabinae is the sister clade to the extant Camelinae.
