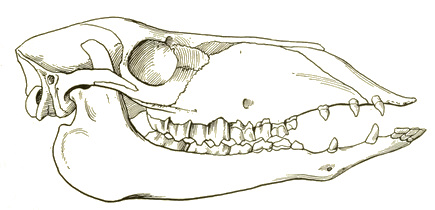
- Protolabis gracilis

Scientific classification
- Kingdom: Animalia
- Phylum: Chordata
- Class: Mammalia
- Order: Artiodactyla
- Family: Camelidae
- Subfamily: †Protolabinae
- Genus: †Protolabis; Cope 1876

Species
- P. barstowensis Lewis 1968; P. coartatus Stirton 1929; P. gracilis Leidy 1858; P. heterodontus Cope 1874; P. inaequidens Cope & Matthew 1915; P. saxeus Matthew 1925; P. yavapaiensis Honey & Taylor 1978

= Protolabis =

Protolabis Temporal range: Arikareean-Hemphillian ~20.4–5.3 Ma

Extinct genus of mammals

Protolabis is an extinct genus of camelid endemic to North America. It lived from the Early to Late Miocene 20.4—5.3 mya, existing for approximately 15 million years. Fossil distribution is widespread from Nicaragua, Central America to Montana and throughout the western U.S.

In addition to the validly described species in this genus, P.pusillus was named by Matthew in 1924, but due to not having a valid description it a nomen nudum. P.prehensillus, described by Cope in 1881, refers to a jawbone fragment with the teeth missing; it is a nomen dubium, but may belong to Procamelus robustus.
