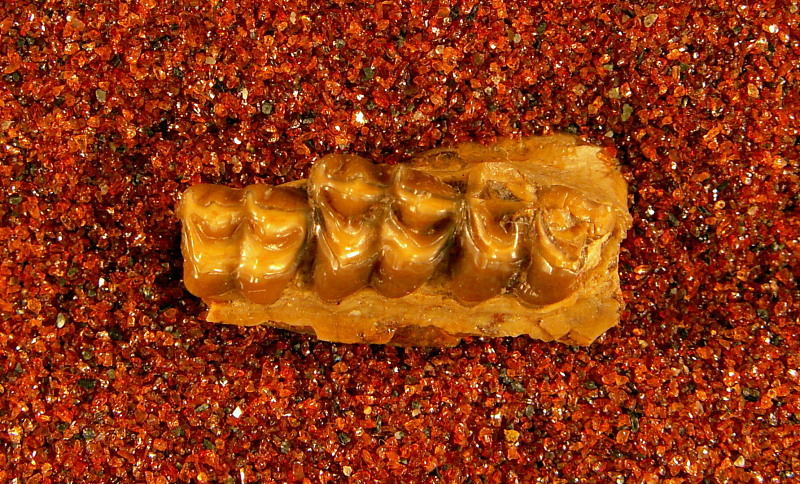
- Poebrodon kayi

Scientific classification
- Kingdom: Animalia
- Phylum: Chordata
- Class: Mammalia
- Order: Artiodactyla
- Family: Camelidae
- Tribe: Camelini
- Genus: †Poebrodon; Gazin (1955)

Species
- P. californicus; P. kayi

= Poebrodon =

Poebrodon Temporal range: Eocene

Extinct genus of mammals

Poebrodon is an extinct genus of terrestrial herbivore in the family Camelidae, endemic to North America during the Uintan / Lutetian (early Middle) Eocene 46.2—42.0 mya, existing for approximately 4.68 million years, Poebrodon is one of the oldest known camelids.

== Taxonomy ==
Poebrodon was named by Gazin (1955). Its type is Poebrodon kayi. It was assigned to Camelidae by Gazin (1955) and Carroll (1988).

== Fossil distribution ==
Fossil distribution ranged from Utah, Wyoming, and Southern California.
