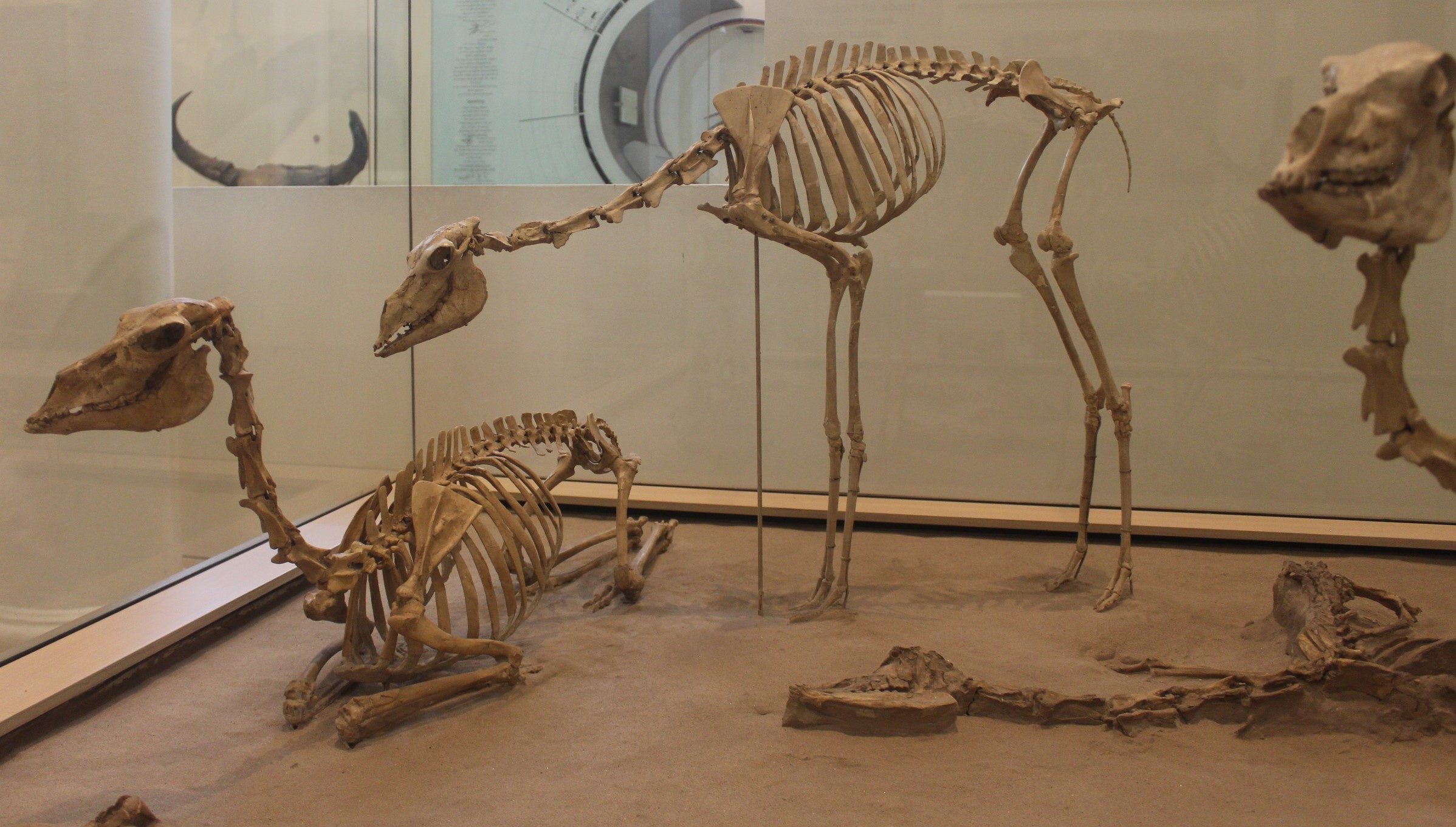
- Stenomylus skeletons (mounted as S. hitchcocki) on display at the American Museum of Natural History

Scientific classification
- Kingdom: Animalia
- Phylum: Chordata
- Class: Mammalia
- Order: Artiodactyla
- Family: Camelidae
- Subfamily: †Stenomylinae; Matthew, 1910

Type genus
- †Stenomylus

Genera and tribe
- †Pseudolabis; †Miotylopus; †Stenomylini Prothero, 1996; †Blickomylus; †Rakomylus; †Stenomylus; †Wyomylus

Synonyms
- Pseudolabidinae Simpson, 1945

= Stenomylinae =

Stenomylinae Temporal range: 32–13 Ma Whitneyan – late Barstovian or early Clarendonian

Extinct subfamily of camelids

The stenomylines (subfamily Stenomylinae) are an extinct group of North American camelids that lived from the Whitneyan (Oligocene) to the late Barstovian or early Clarendonian (middle Miocene). They are often called the "gazelle-like camels" because of their light build and long, gracile limbs. The subfamily includes the basal genera Pseudolabis and Miotylopus and the tribe Stenomylini, which comprises Blickomylus, Rakomylus, Stenomylus and Wyomylus.

Stenomylines were medium-sized to large camels with an elongated snout and a deep maxillary fossa that extended far from front to back. Their cheek teeth were higher-crowned and narrower than those of earlier camels such as Poebrotherium and Paratylopus; the upper cheek teeth had a very weak mesostyle or none at all, and the lower teeth lacked a metastylid. The premaxilla extended back to the level of the first premolar.

The more derived Stenomylini first appeared in the late Arikareean, about 23 million years ago, and were a successful and widespread group across the High Plains and southwestern North America, as far south as Mexico. Blickomylus, Rakomylus and Wyomylus had the highest-crowned molars of their time, exceeding even those of the early equids that shared their habitats.
