= Cuyamacamelus =

Cuyamacamelus Temporal range: Miocene

Scientific classification
- Domain: Eukaryota
- Kingdom: Animalia
- Phylum: Chordata
- Class: Mammalia
- Order: Artiodactyla
- Family: Camelidae
- Tribe: Camelini
- Genus: †Cuyamacamelus; Kelly (1992)

Species
- C. jamesi

Extinct genus of mammals

Cuyamacamelus is an extinct monospecific genus in the camel family, endemic to North America. It lived during the Middle Miocene 16.0—13.6 mya existing for approximately 3 million years.
