= Matthewlabis =

Matthewlabis Temporal range: Early Oligocene

Scientific classification
- Domain: Eukaryota
- Kingdom: Animalia
- Phylum: Chordata
- Class: Mammalia
- Order: Artiodactyla
- Family: Camelidae
- Genus: †Matthewlabis; Prothero, 2011

Species
- M. cedrensis Matthew 1901

Synonyms
- Paralabis Lull 1921

Extinct genus of mammals

Matthewlabis is an extinct genus of camelid endemic to North America. It lived in the Early Oligocene 33.3—30.8 mya, existing for approximately 2 million years. Fossils have been found only in Wyoming and eastern Nebraska. It was previously named Paralabis, but this name had been previously used for a genus of earwig, so the name was changed in 2011.
