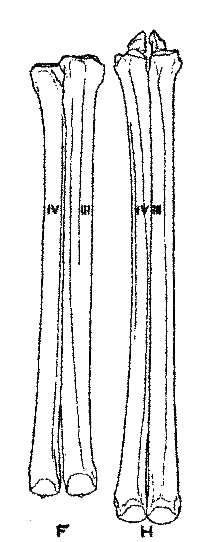
- Gentilicamelus sternbergi

Scientific classification
- Domain: Eukaryota
- Kingdom: Animalia
- Phylum: Chordata
- Class: Mammalia
- Order: Artiodactyla
- Family: Camelidae
- Tribe: Camelini
- Genus: †Gentilicamelus; Loomis 1936

Species
- G. sternbergi Cope 1879; G. cameloides Wortman 1898

= Gentilicamelus =

Gentilicamelus Temporal range: Early Miocene

Prehistoric camelid

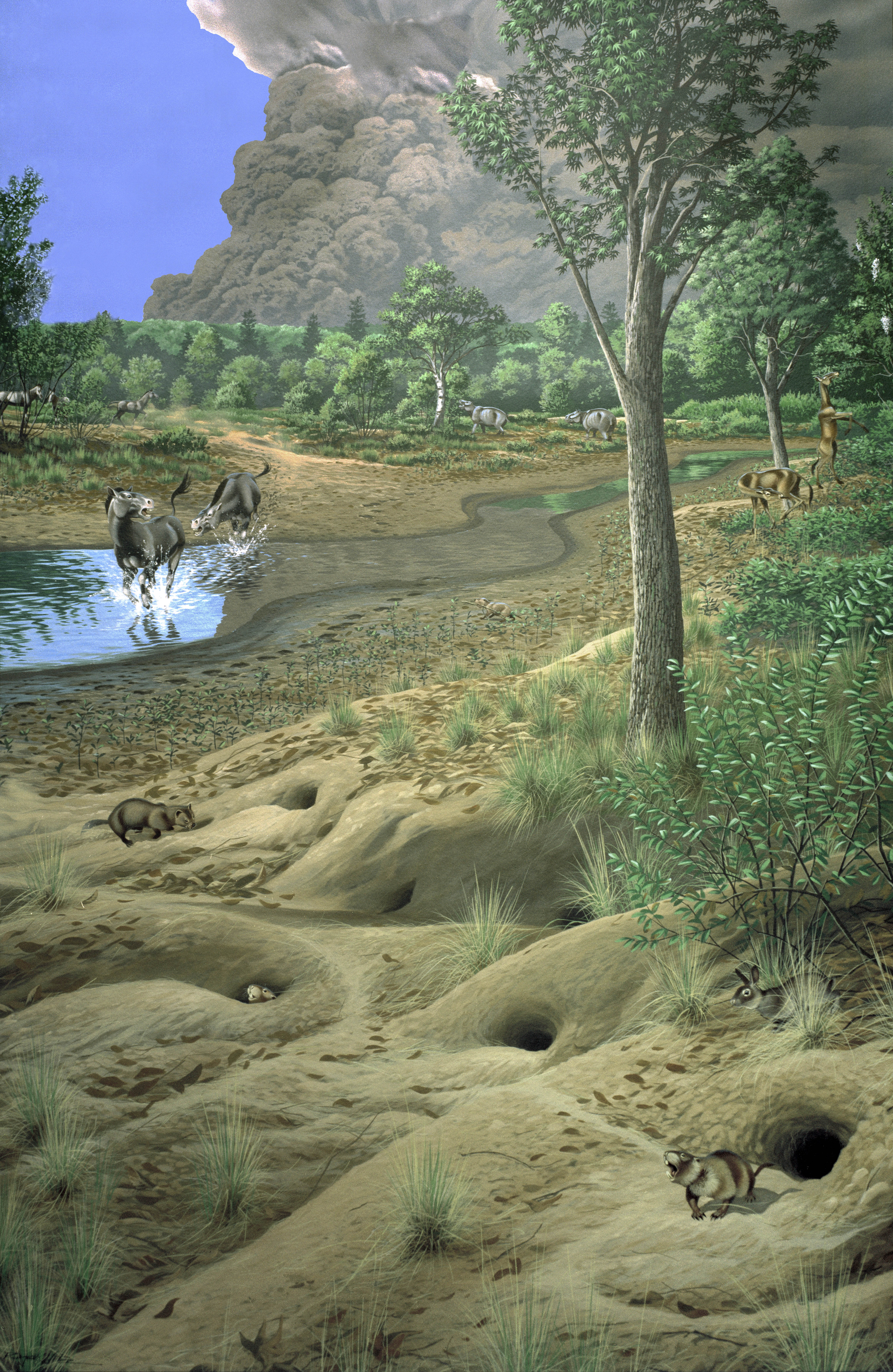
Restoration of G. sternbergi (upper right) and other animals of the Kimberly Assemblage

Gentilicamelus is an extinct genus of camelid endemic to North America. It lived during the Early Miocene 23.0–20.4 mya, existing for approximately 3 million years.
