= Honeycamelus =

Honeycamelus Temporal range: Miocene, 20.6–16 Ma

Scientific classification
- Kingdom: Animalia
- Phylum: Chordata
- Class: Mammalia
- Order: Artiodactyla
- Family: Camelidae
- Subfamily: Camelinae
- Genus: †Honeycamelus; Prothero et al., 2026

Species
- †Honeycamelus priscus (Matthew, 1924) (type)

Extinct genus of mammals

Honeycamelus is an extinct genus of camelids that lived during the Miocene 20.6–16 million years ago, existing for about 4.6 million years.

== Taxonomy ==
Honeycamelus was originally named Alticamelus priscus by Matthew (1924) on the basis of AMNH 14189, which comprises a skull with the atlas and axis, tibia, and pes. MacDonald (1956) referred this species to Aepycamelus after designating Alticamelus a nomen dubium, but Honey et al. (1998) noted that A. priscus was more primitive than Camelini or Lamini. To honor James Honey for recognizing that priscus represented an unnamed species, Prothero et al. (2026) erected the new genus Honeycamelus for A. priscus.
