= Michenia =

Michenia Temporal range: Early Miocene–Middle Miocene

Scientific classification
- Kingdom: Animalia
- Phylum: Chordata
- Class: Mammalia
- Infraclass: Placentalia
- Order: Artiodactyla
- Family: Camelidae
- Tribe: Camelini
- Genus: †Michenia; Frick and Taylor 1971

Type species
- †Michenia agatensis

Species
- See text

Extinct genus of mammals

Michenia is an extinct genus of camelid endemic to North America. They lived from the Early Miocene to Middle Miocene 20.43–10.3 mya, existing for approximately 10 million years. Fossils have been found from California to Texas, Alberta, Idaho and Nebraska.

== Species ==
- M. agatensis Frick & Taylor 1971
- M. deschutensis Dingus 1990
- M. exilis Matthew & Macdonald 1960
- M. mudhillsnsis Pagnac 2005
