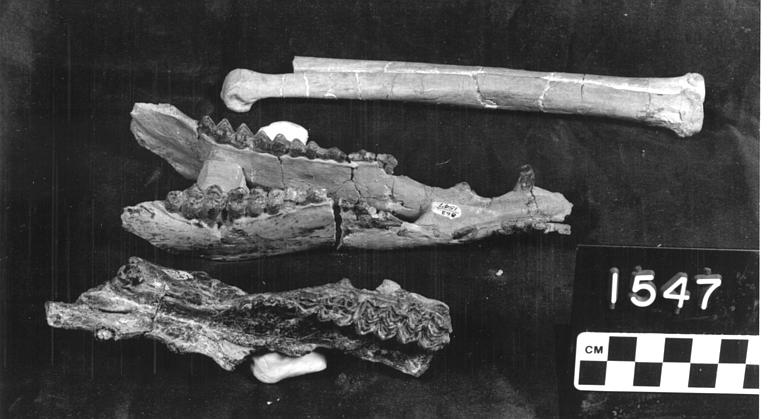
- Fossils

Scientific classification
- Kingdom: Animalia
- Phylum: Chordata
- Class: Mammalia
- Order: Artiodactyla
- Family: Camelidae
- Tribe: Camelini
- Genus: †Paratylopus; Matthew (1909)

Species
- P. labiatus; P. primaevus; P. wortmani (nomen dubium)

Synonyms
- Poebrotherium labratum

= Paratylopus =

Paratylopus Temporal range: Oligocene–Middle Miocene

Extinct genus of mammals

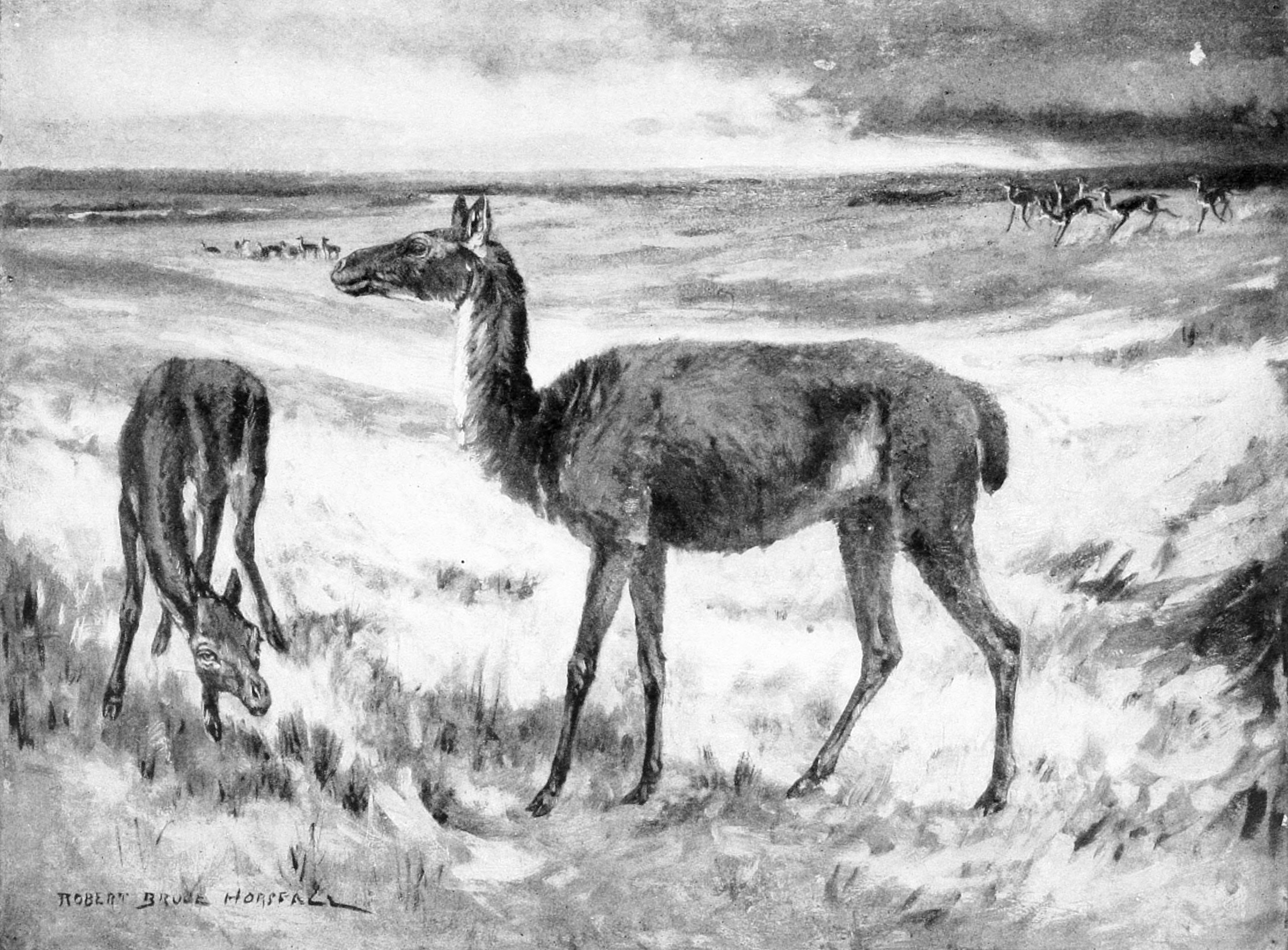
Life restoration of P. labiatus by Robert Bruce Horsfall

Paratylopus is an extinct genus of camelid, endemic to North America. It lived from the Oligocene to the Middle Miocene 33.9—16.0 Mya, existing for approximately 18 million years. Fossils have been found in western Wyoming, and from eastern Nebraska to northeastern Colorado and southwestern South Dakota.
