= Nothokemas =

Nothokemas Temporal range: Late Oligocene–Early Miocene

Scientific classification
- Kingdom: Animalia
- Phylum: Chordata
- Class: Mammalia
- Order: Artiodactyla
- Family: Camelidae
- Subfamily: †Nothokemadinae
- Genus: †Nothokemas; White 1947

Type species
- †Oxydactylus floridanus

Species
- N. floridanus Simpson 1932; N. hidalgensis Patton 1969; N. waldropi Frailey 1978

Extinct genus of mammals

Nothokemas is an extinct genus of camelid endemic to North America. It lived from the Late Oligocene to the Early Miocene 24.8— 16.0 mya, existing for approximately 9 million years. Fossils have been found along the Gulf Coast from Texas to Florida.
