= Miotylopus =

Miotylopus Temporal range: Early Miocene

Scientific classification
- Kingdom: Animalia
- Phylum: Chordata
- Class: Mammalia
- Order: Artiodactyla
- Family: Camelidae
- Genus: †Miotylopus; Schlaikjer 1935

Species
- M. gibbi Loomis 1911; M. leonardi Loomis 1911; M. taylori Prothero 1996

Extinct genus of mammals

Miotylopus is an extinct genus of camelid endemic to North America. It lived during the Early Miocene 24.8—20.4 mya, existing for approximately 5 million years. Fossils have been found in Wyoming and from Nebraska to Southern California.

M. leonardi was often assigned to another genus, "Protomeryx", whose type species P. halli was established by Leidy in 1856. But this is based on a single jawbone fragment which is not very diagnostic. Subsequently, "Protomeryx" was used as a "wastebasket taxon" for any and all camelids from the Whitneyan and Arikareean stages that were not clearly recognizable as Poebrotherium. Presently considered a nomen dubium, "Protomeryx" (as defined by its original type species) might actually be a synonym of Poebrotherium, Paratylopus, Pseudolabis, or, indeed, Miotylopus.
