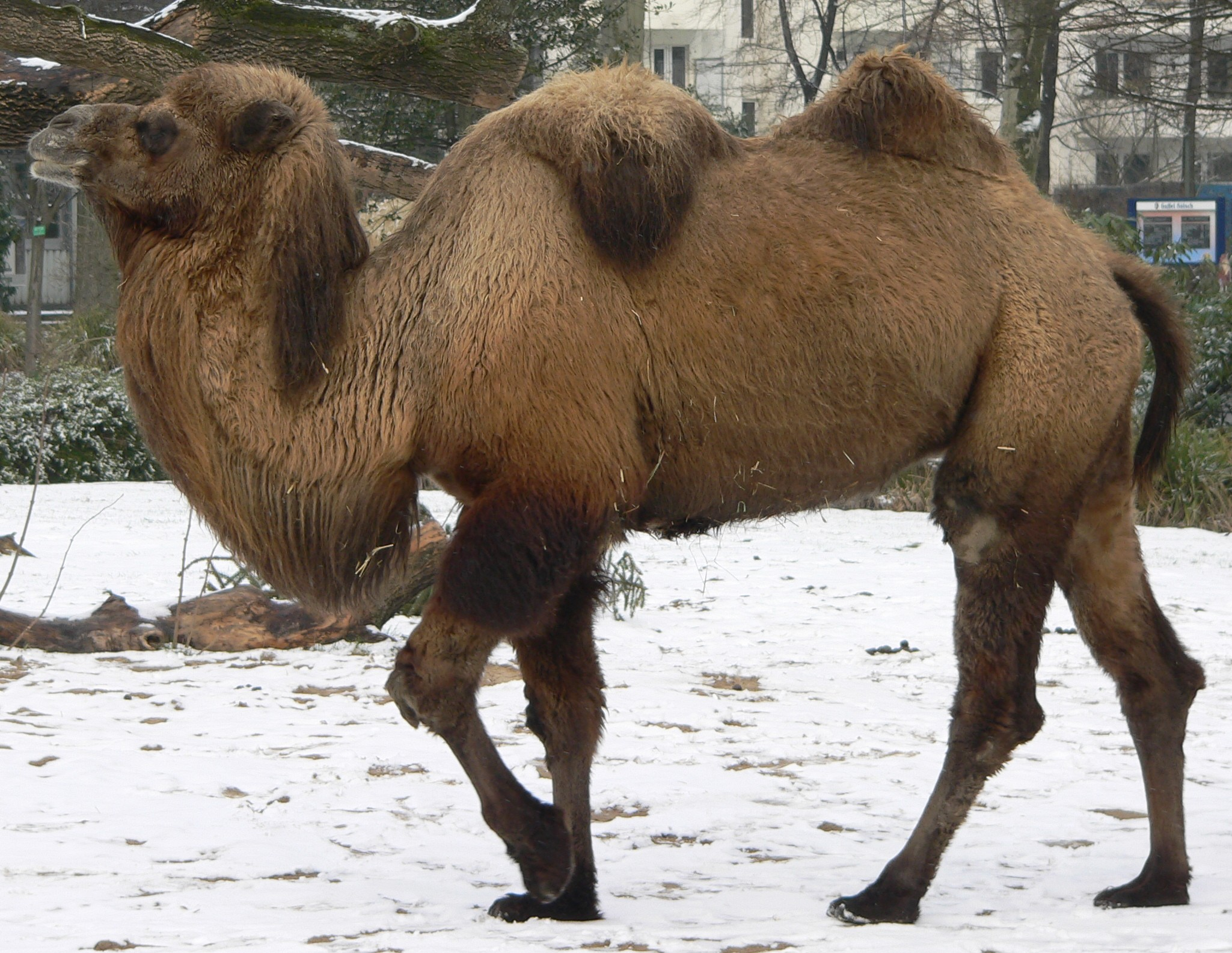
- A Bactrian camel (Camelus bactrianus) walking in snow.
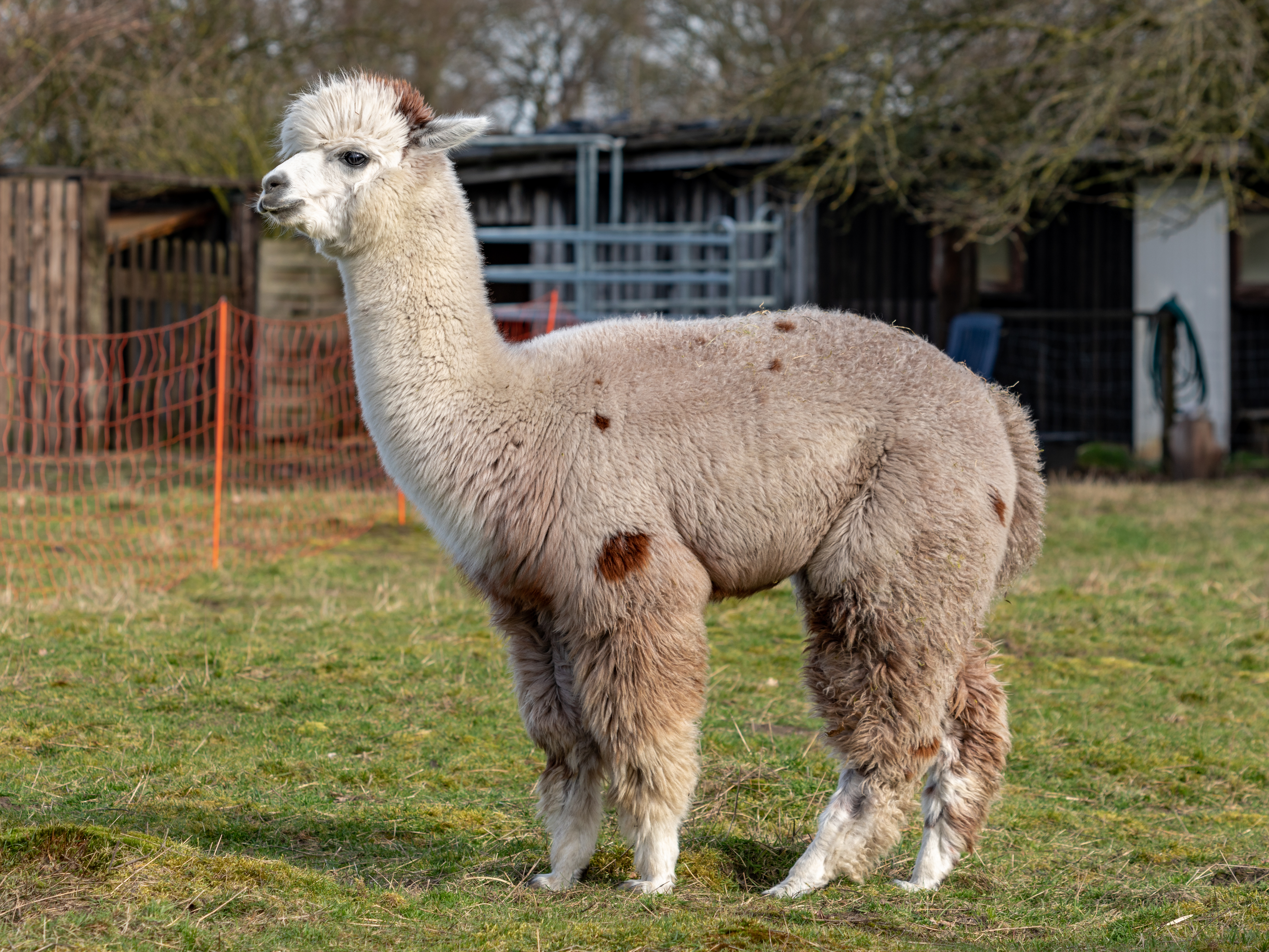
- An alpaca (Lama pacos) on a farm.

Scientific classification
- Kingdom: Animalia
- Phylum: Chordata
- Class: Mammalia
- Order: Artiodactyla
- Suborder: Tylopoda
- Superfamily: Cameloidea
- Family: Camelidae; Gray, 1821

Type genus
- Camelus

Subfamilies and genera
- †Australocamelus; †Hesperocamelus; †Oxydactylus; †Palauchenia; †Poebrodon; †Poebrotherium; †Paratylopus; †Priscocamelus; †Matthewlabis; Camelinae; †Floridatragulinae; †Miolabinae; †Nothokemadinae; †Protolabinae; †Stenomylinae
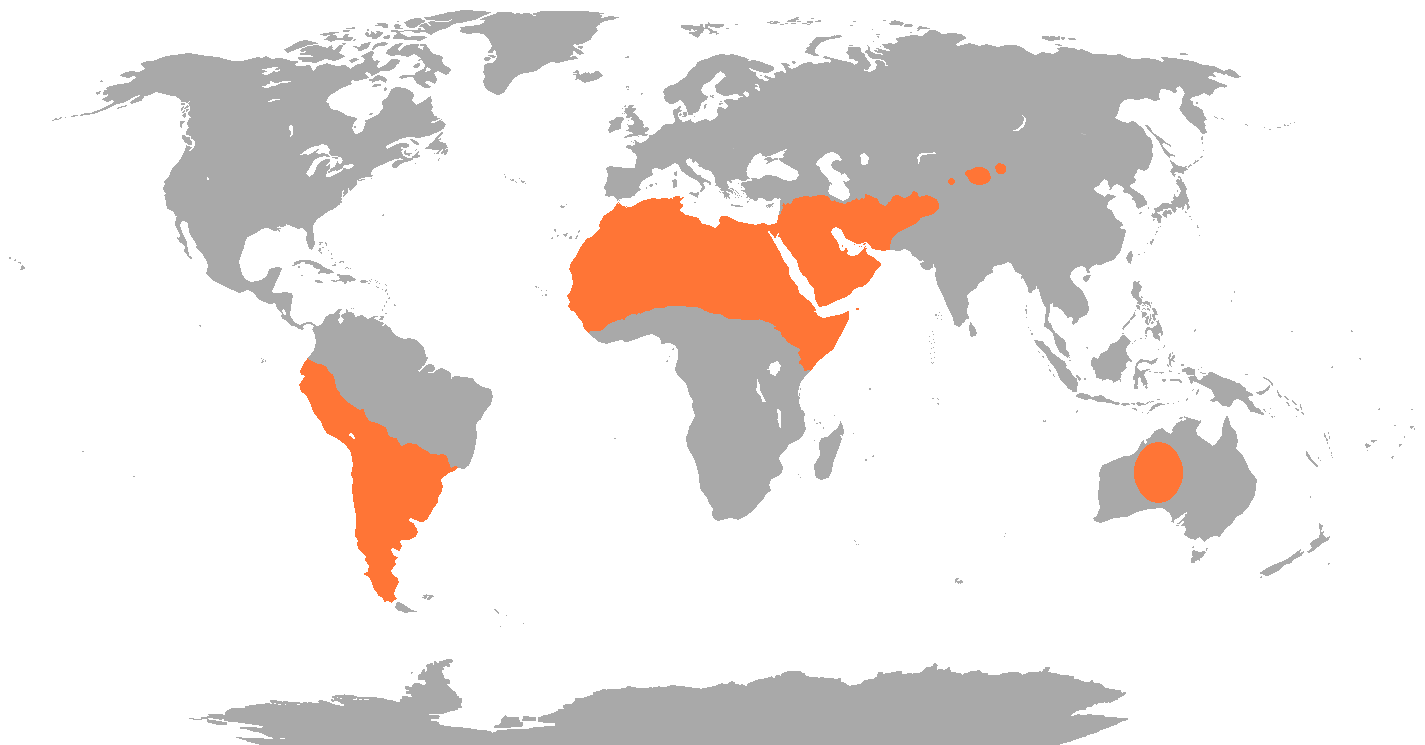
- Range of camelids, all living species

= Camelidae =

Camelidae Temporal range: 50–0 Ma Middle Eocene – Holocene

Family of mammals

Camelidae is a family of mammals belonging to the ungulate order Artiodactyla (even-toed ungulates) and the only living family in the suborder Tylopoda. The seven extant species of camelid are divided into two tribes, Camelini, including dromedary camels, Bactrian camels and wild Bactrian camels, and Lamini, including llamas, alpacas, vicuñas, and guanacos.

== Characteristics ==
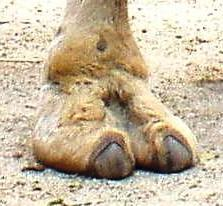
Camelid feet lack functional hooves, with the toe bones being embedded in a broad, cutaneous pad.

Camelids are large, strictly herbivorous animals with slender necks and long legs. They differ from ruminants in a number of ways. Their dentition show traces of vestigial central incisors in the incisive bone, and the third incisors have developed into canine-like tusks. Camelids also have true canine teeth and tusk-like premolars, which are separated from the molars by a gap. As in ruminants, the upper incisors are largely absent and are replaced by a dental pad consisting of connective tissue covered with epithelium. The musculature of the hind limbs differs from those of other ungulates in that the legs are attached to the body only at the top of the thigh, rather than attached by skin and muscle from the knee upwards. Because of this, camelids have to lie down by resting on their knees with their legs tucked underneath their bodies. They have three-chambered stomachs, rather than four-chambered ones; their upper lips are split in two, with each part separately mobile; and, uniquely among mammals, their red blood cells are elliptical. They also have a unique type of antibodies, which lack the light chain, in addition to the normal antibodies found in other mammals. These so-called heavy-chain antibodies are being used to develop single-domain antibodies with potential pharmaceutical applications.

Camelids do not have hooves; rather, they have two-toed feet with toenails and soft foot pads (Tylopoda is Greek for "padded foot"). Most of the weight of the animal rests on these tough, leathery sole pads. The South American camelids have adapted to the steep and rocky terrain by adjusting the pads on their toes to maintain grip. The surface area of camels' foot pads can increase with increasing velocity in order to reduce pressure on the feet and larger members of the camelid species will usually have larger pad area, which helps to distribute weight across the foot. Many fossil camelids were unguligrade and probably hooved, in contrast to all living species.

Camelids are behaviorally similar in many ways, including their walking gait, in which both legs on the same side are moved simultaneously. While running, camelids engage a unique "running pace gait" in which limbs on the same side move in the same pattern they walk, with both left legs moving and then both right, which ensures that the fore and hind limb will not collide while in fast motion. During this motion, all four limbs momentarily are off the ground at the same time. Consequently, camelids large enough for human beings to ride have a typical swaying motion.

Dromedary camels, bactrian camels, llamas, and alpacas are all induced ovulators.

The three Afro-Asian camel species have developed extensive adaptations to their lives in harsh, near-waterless environments. Wild populations of the Bactrian camel are even able to drink brackish water, and some herds live in nuclear test areas.

Comparative table of the seven extant species in the family Camelidae:

Species	Image	Natural range	Weight
Camelus
Bactrian camel (Camelus bactrianus)		Central and Inner Asia (entirely domesticated)	300 to 1,000 kg (660 to 2,200 lb)
Dromedary (Camelus dromedarius)		South Asia and Middle East (entirely domesticated)	300 to 600 kg (660 to 1,320 lb)
Wild Bactrian camel (Camelus ferus)		China and Mongolia (not ancestral to the domestic Bactrian)	300 to 820 kg (660 to 1,800 lb)
Lama
Llama (Lama glama)		(domesticated form of the guanaco)	130 to 200 kg (290 to 440 lb)
Guanaco (Lama guanicoe)		South America	about 90 to 120 kg (200 to 260 lb)
Alpaca (Lama pacos)		(domesticated form of the vicuña)	48 to 84 kg (106 to 185 lb)
Vicuña (Lama vicugna)		South American Andes	35 to 65 kg (77 to 143 lb)

== Evolution ==
- Camelid
  - Lamini
    - Lama
      - L. glama
      - L. guanicoe
      - L. vicugna
      - L. pacos
  - Camelini
    - Camelus
      - C. bactrianus
      - C. dromedarius
      - C. ferus
    - †Camelops
      ⊞
      - C. kansanus
      - C. hesternus
      - C. minodokae
      ⊟

A family tree indicating different species within the Camelidae family

A dymaxion map of the biogeographic distribution of Camelidae species: Tertiary distribution Present-day distributions Introduced (feral) distributions The yellow dot is the origin of the family Camelidae and the black arrows are the historic migration routes that explain the present-day distribution.

Camelids are unusual in that their modern distribution is almost the inverse of their area of origin. Camelids first appeared very early in the evolution of the even-toed ungulates, around 50 to 40 million years ago during the middle Eocene, in present-day North America. Among the earliest camelids was the rabbit-sized Protylopus, which still had four toes on each foot. By the late Eocene, around 35 million years ago, camelids such as Poebrotherium had lost the two lateral toes, and were about the size of a modern goat.

The family diversified and prospered, with the two living tribes, the Camelini and Lamini, diverging in the late early Miocene, about 17 million years ago, but remained restricted to North America until about 6 million years ago, when Paracamelus crossed the Bering land bridge into Eurasia, giving rise to the modern camels, and about 3–2 million years ago, when Hemiauchenia emigrated into South America (as part of the Great American Interchange), giving rise to the modern llamas. A population of Paracamelus continued living in North America and evolved into the high arctic camel, which survived until the middle Pleistocene.

The original camelids of North America remained common until the quite recent geological past, but then disappeared, possibly as a result of hunting or habitat alterations by the earliest human settlers, and possibly as a result of changing environmental conditions after the last ice age, or a combination of these factors. Three species groups survived—the dromedary of northern Africa and southwest Asia; the Bactrian camel of central Asia; and the South American group, which has now diverged into a range of forms that are closely related, but usually classified as four species—llamas, alpacas, guanacos, and vicuñas. Camelids were domesticated by early Andean peoples, and remain in use today.

Fossil camelids show a wider variety than their modern counterparts. One North American genus, Titanotylopus, stood 3.5 m (11 ft) at the shoulder, compared with about 2.0 m (6 ft 7 in) for the largest modern camelids. Other extinct camelids included small, gazelle-like animals, such as Stenomylus. Finally, a number of very tall, giraffe-like camelids were adapted to feeding on leaves from high trees, including such genera as Aepycamelus and Oxydactylus. The word Carnyx (pl. Carnices) has been proposed as a generic common name for these giraffe-like camelids.

Whether the wild Bactrian camel (Camelus ferus) is a distinct species or a subspecies (C. bactrianus ferus) is still debated. The divergence date is 0.7 million years ago, long before the start of domestication.

== Scientific classification ==
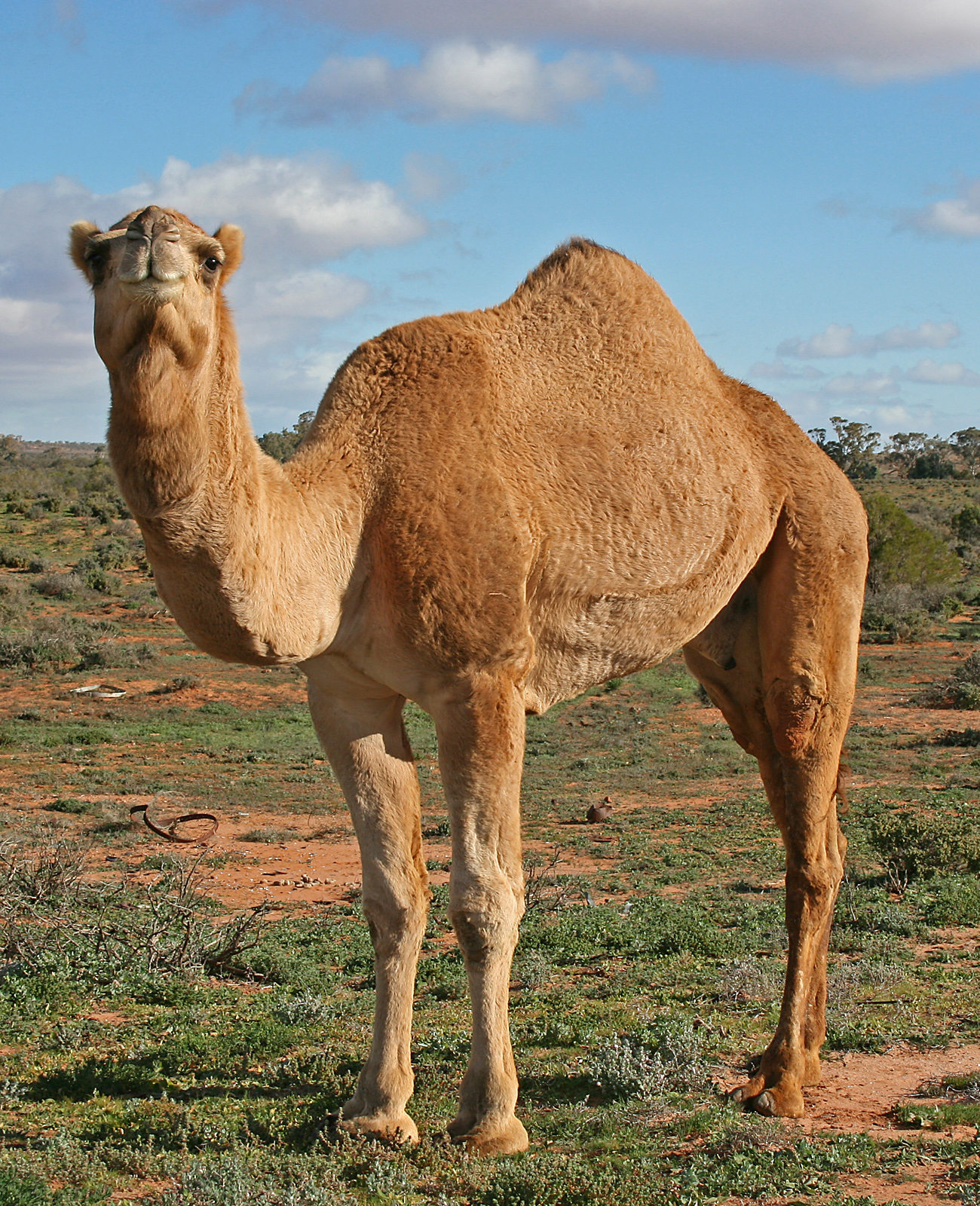
A dromedary camel (C. dromedarius) in the Australian outback, near Silverton, New South Wales

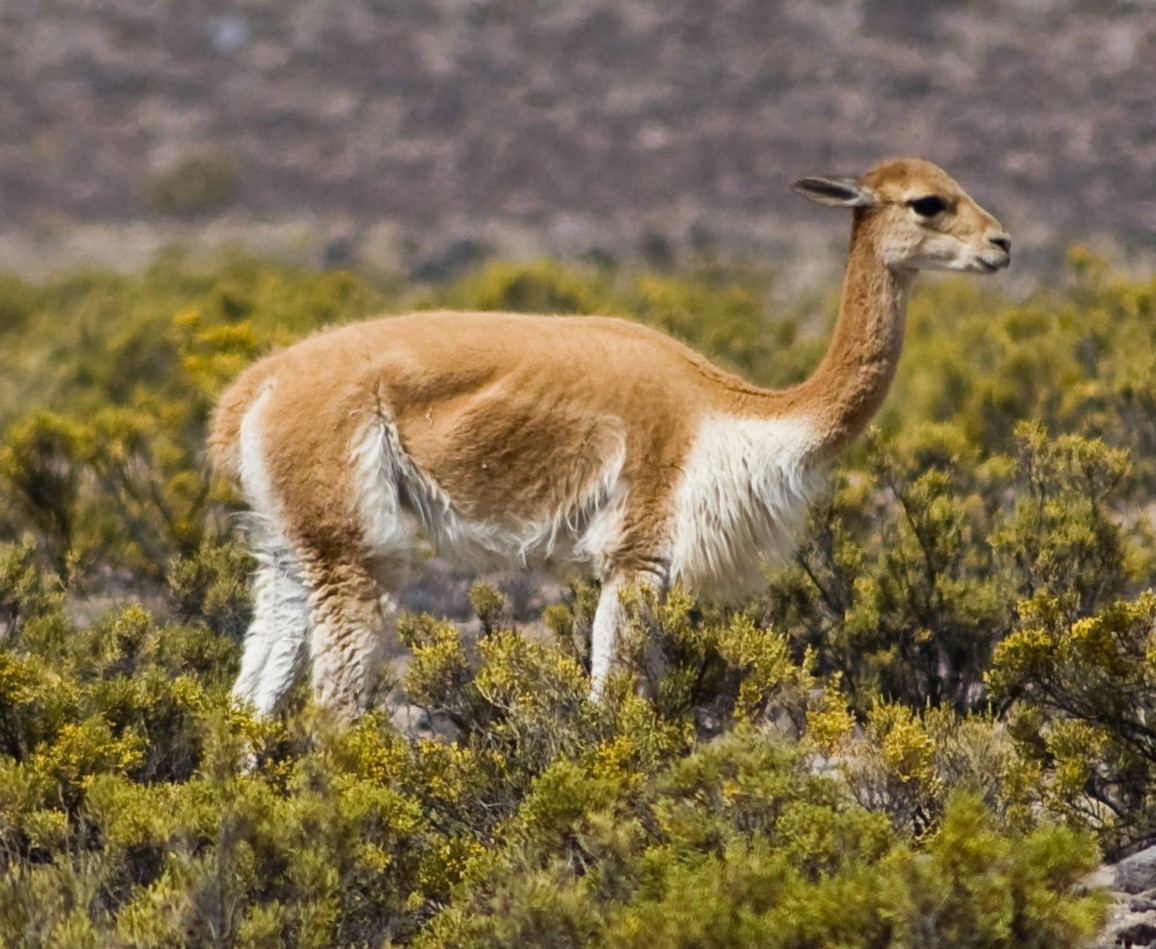
South American vicuña (Lama vicugna)

Family Camelidae

- Incertae sedis:
  - Genus: †Australocamelus
  - Genus: †Hesperocamelus
  - Genus: †Oxydactylus
  - Genus: †Poebrodon
  - Genus: †Paratylopus
  - Genus: †Priscocamelus
  - Genus: †Matthewlabis
- †Subfamily Poebrotheriinae
  - Genus: †Poebrotherium
- †Subfamily Floridatragulinae
  - Genus: †Aguascalientia
  - Genus: †Floridatragulus
  - Genus: †Longirostrotylopus
  - Genus: †Stevenscamelus
- †Subfamily Miolabinae
  - Genus: †Capricamelus
  - Genus: †Cuyamacamelus
  - Genus: †Homocamelus
  - Genus: †Miolabis
  - Genus: †Nothotylopus
  - Genus: †Paramiolabis
- †Subfamily Nothokemadinae
  - Genus: †Gentilicamelus
  - Genus: †Nothokemas
- †Subfamily Protolabinae
  - Genus: †Michenia
  - Genus: †Protolabis
  - Genus: †Tanymykter
- †Subfamily Stenomylinae
  - Genus: †Blickomylus
  - Genus: †Miotylopus
  - Genus: †Pseudolabis
  - Genus: †Rakomylus
  - Genus: †Stenomylus
  - Genus: †Wyomylus
- Subfamily Camelinae
  - Genus: †Honeycamelus
  - Tribe Lamini
    - Genus: Lama
      - Llama, Lama glama
      - Guanaco, Lama guanicoe
      - Alpaca, Lama pacos
      - Vicuña, Lama vicugna
    - Genus: †Aepycamelus (synonym = †Blancocamelus)
    - Genus: †Alforjas
    - Genus: †Eulamaops
    - Genus: †Hemiauchenia
    - Genus: †Palaeolama
    - Genus: †Pleiolama
    - Genus: †Vampyrocamelus
  - Tribe Camelini
    - Genus: Camelus
      - Bactrian camel, Camelus bactrianus
      - Dromedary, Camelus dromedarius
      - Wild Bactrian camel, Camelus ferus
      - †Greater Syrian camel, Camelus moreli
      - †Lesser Syrian camel, Camelus concordieae
      - †Camelus sivalensis
      - †Camelus knoblochi
    - Genus: †Camelops
    - Genus: †Gigantocamelus
    - Genus: †Megacamelus
    - Genus: †Megatylopus
    - Genus: †Paracamelus
    - Genus: †Procamelus
    - Genus: †Titanotylopus

== Phylogeny ==
- Camelid ancestor
  - - - Hemiauchenia (10.3 to 0.012 mya)
        - Lama guanicoe
        - Lama glama
        - Lama pacos
        - Lama vicugna
      - Palaeolama (1.8 to 0.012 mya)
      - Blancocamelus (1.8 to 0.3 mya)
      - Pleiolama (10.3 to 2.588 mya)
    - - Camelops (2.588 to 0.012 mya)
      - Paracamelus (11.608 to 0.781 mya)
        - Bactrian camel
        - Dromedary
      - Procamelus (15.97 to 5.332 mya)
  - Hesperocamelus (20.43 to 15.97 mya)

Endemic to South America
Endemic to North and South America
Endemic to North America
Endemic to Asia
Endemic to Asia and Africa

== Notable extinct genera ==
Genus name	Epoch	Remarks
Aepycamelus	Miocene	Tall, s-shaped neck, true padded camel feet
Aguascalientia	Earliest Miocene	A small, primitive, narrow-snouted floridatraguline camel from Mexico, Texas, and Panama
Camelops	Pliocene-Pleistocene	Large, with true camel feet and hump. Status uncertain
Eulamaops	Pleistocene	From South America
Floridatragulus	Early Miocene	An unusual species of camel with a long snout
Hemiauchenia	Miocene-Pleistocene	A North and South American lamine genus
Megatylopus	Miocene-Early Pleistocene	Large camelid from North America
Megacamelus	Miocene-Pleistocene	The largest species of camelid
Michenia	Early-Middle Miocene	A cameline that existed for 10 million years in North America
Oxydactylus	Early Miocene	The earliest member of the "giraffe camel" family
Palaeolama	Pleistocene	A North and South American lamine genus
Poebrodon	Middle Eocene	Earliest member of the camelids
Poebrotherium	Late Eocene - Oligocene	This species of camel took the place of deer and antelope in the White River Badlands.
Procamelus	Miocene	Ancestor of extinct Titanolypus and modern Camelus
Stenomylus	Early Miocene	Small, gazelle-like camel that lived in large herds on the Great Plains
Stevenscamelus	Late Eocene	Long-snouted primitive relative of Floridatragulus
Titanotylopus	Miocene-Pleistocene	Tall, humped, true camel feet

== International Year of Camelids ==
In October 2017 the United Nations declared 2024 to be the International Year of Camelids in order to show how camelids are important for food security, economics and culture for many pastoral communities.
