= Dental pad =

Pad inside the upper jaw of ruminant mammals

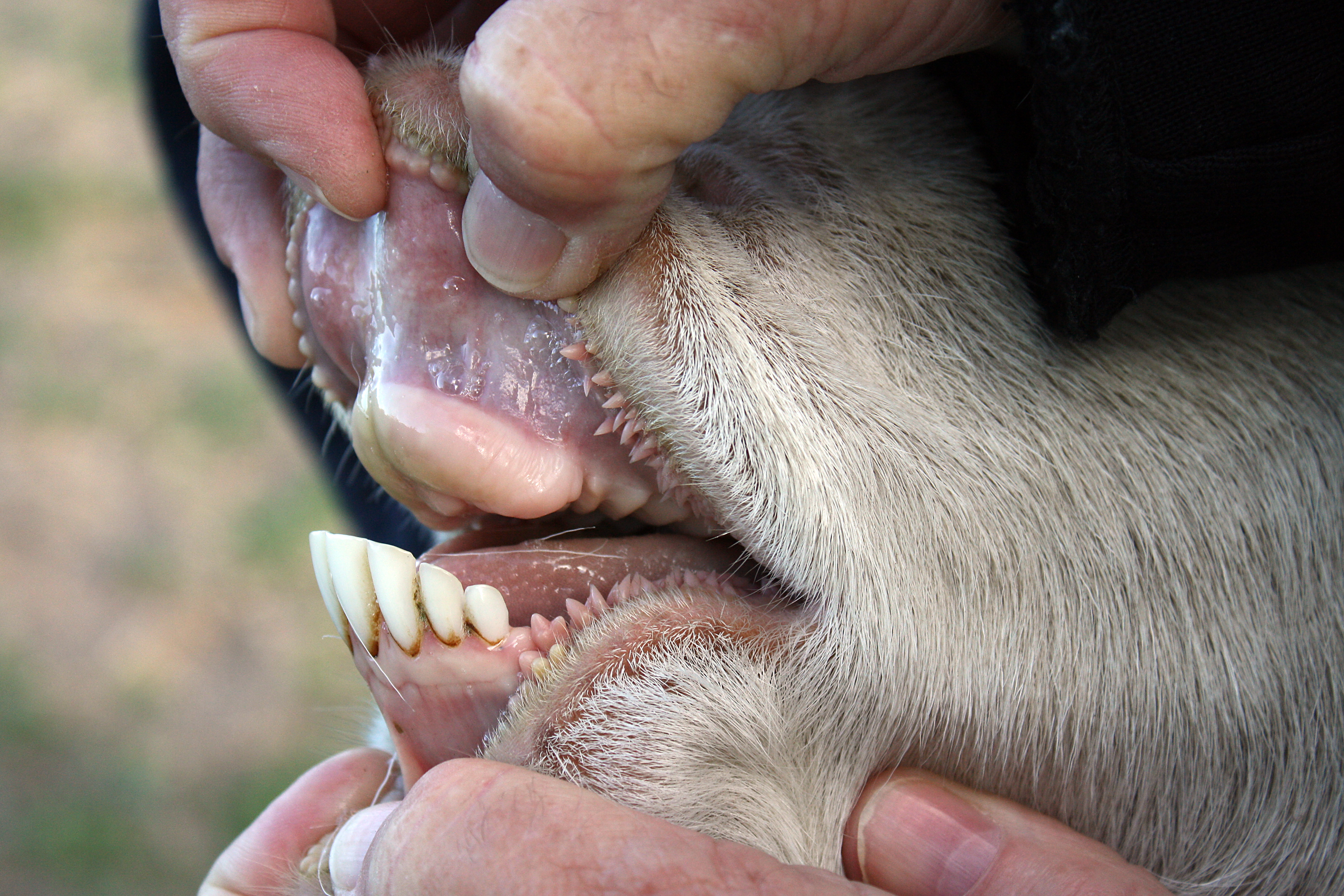
Dental pad of domestic livestock. Note the lack of upper incisors and canine teeth.

The dental pad or browsing pad is a feature of ruminant and camelid dental anatomy that results from a lack of upper incisors and helps them gather large quantities of grass and other plant matter. This feature can be found in ruminants such as cattle and sheep. In cattle, the tongue is used to grasp food and pinch it off between the dental pad and the lower incisors. However, since they cannot bite grass off, they are inefficient at grazing more closely than 6 inches (15 cm) from the ground.

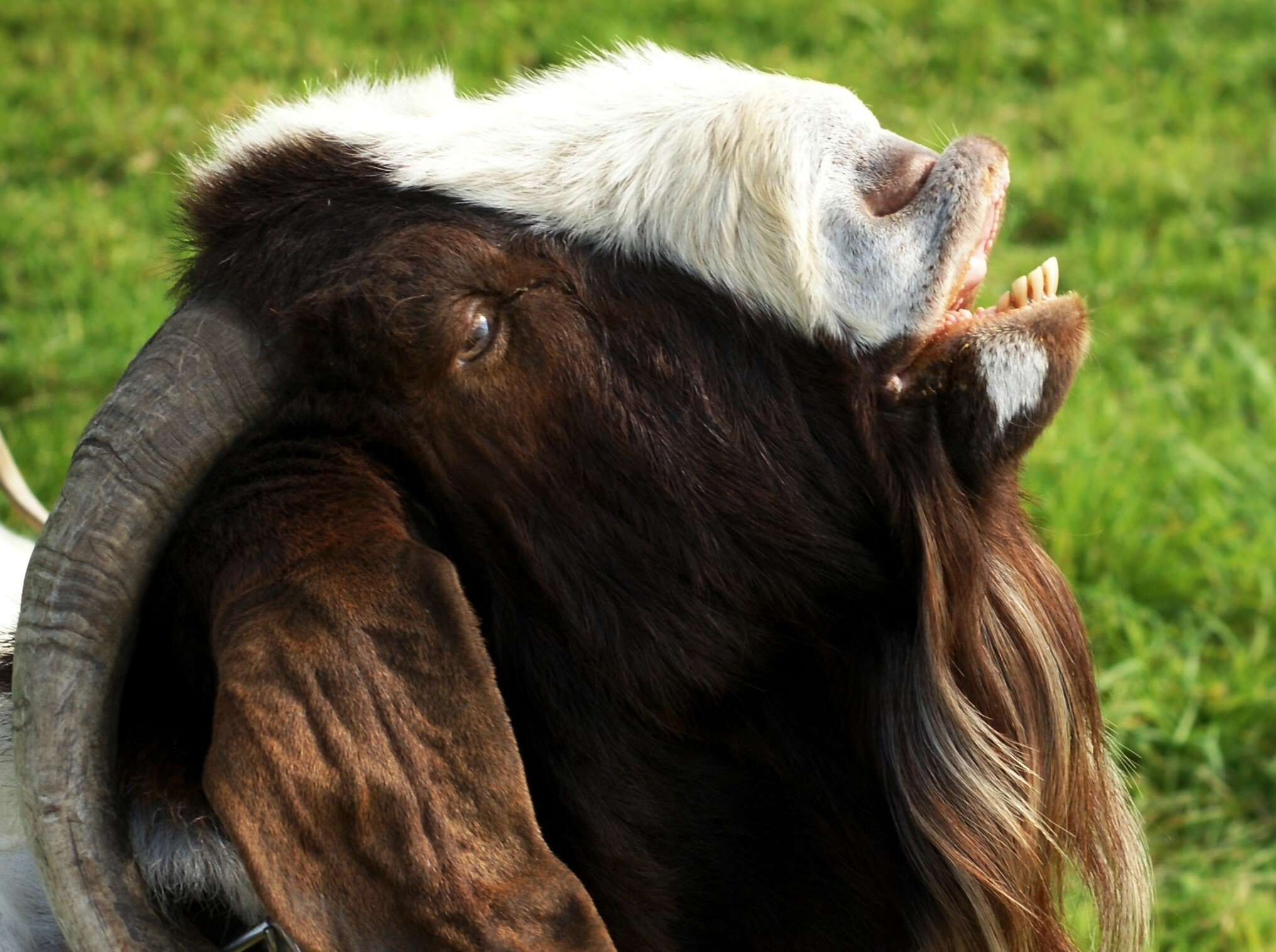
A goat exhibiting the Flehmen response – the dental pad is visible
