= Megacamelus =

Megacamelus Temporal range: late Hemphillian (latest Miocene – earliest Pliocene

Scientific classification
- Kingdom: Animalia
- Phylum: Chordata
- Class: Mammalia
- Order: Artiodactyla
- Family: Camelidae
- Genus: †Megacamelus; Frick, 1929
- Species: †M. merriami

Binomial name
- †Megacamelus merriami (Frick, 1921)

Synonyms
- Pliauchenia merriami Frick, 1921; Megacamelus blicki Frick, 1929

Extinct genus of mammals

Megacamelus is an extinct genus of camelid from the late Hemphillian (latest Miocene or earliest Pliocene) of North America. It contains a single valid species, Megacamelus merriami, is known from California, Arizona, and Nebraska.

Megacamelus was among the largest genera of camelid. It and its close relatives of the late Neogene (Megatylopus, Gigantocamelus, and Titanotylopus) are often known as "giant camels". The closest relative of Megacamelus is Gigantocamelus, which could probably grow even larger. Giant camels are part of the tribe Camelini, alongside modern camels in the genus Camelus.

== History ==
The first fossil of Megacamelus to be discovered was a partial skeleton from the Mount Eden Formation, in the San Timoteo Badlands of California. Frick (1921) classified the Mount Eden camel as "Pliauchenia merriami". Later, Frick (1929) named a new genus and species, Megacamelus blicki, in a field report discussing a large number of well-preserved camel fossils found at Keams Canyon, on the Hopi Reservation in Arizona.

Harrison (1985) redescribed the Mount Eden and Keams Canyon camels, recognizing that they represent the same species. As "Pliauchenia" is an invalid wastebasket taxon, she provided the new combination Megacamelus merriami, uniting Frick's 1921 species and 1929 genus. Megacamelus fossils have also been found in the Snake Creek beds of Nebraska.

== Description ==
Complete skulls of Megacamelus range from 69.3–82 cm (27.3–32.3 in) long. Giant camels on average were about 3.4 m (11 ft) tall at the shoulder, and Megacamelus may have reached 4.2 m (14 ft) at the shoulder.

Megacamelus has a robust build and a deep snout which is flattened at the top. Its dental formula is 1.1.3.33.1.3.3. The degree of cheek tooth hypsodonty (tooth height) is second only to Gigantocamelus among giant camels. The upper third incisor (I3), upper canine, and upper first premolar (P1) are all caniniform (fang-shaped) and similar in size, unlike Gigantocamelus which has a vestigial I3 and a very large upper canine.

Compared to Gigantocamelus, the chin is less blunt, with an arc-shaped incisor row and a longer gap between the incisors and canines. It is less narrow than Titanotylopus, and retains a lower first premolar (p1). The metapodials and other limb bones of Megacamelus are proportionally longer and less robust than Gigantocamelus, but shorter and more robust than Megatylopus or Titanotylopus.
