= Astragalus =

Astragalus may refer to:

- Astragalus (plant), a large genus of herbs and small shrubs
- Astragalus (bone), the talus or ankle bone

== See also ==
- Astragal, a moulding profile in architecture or woodwork
