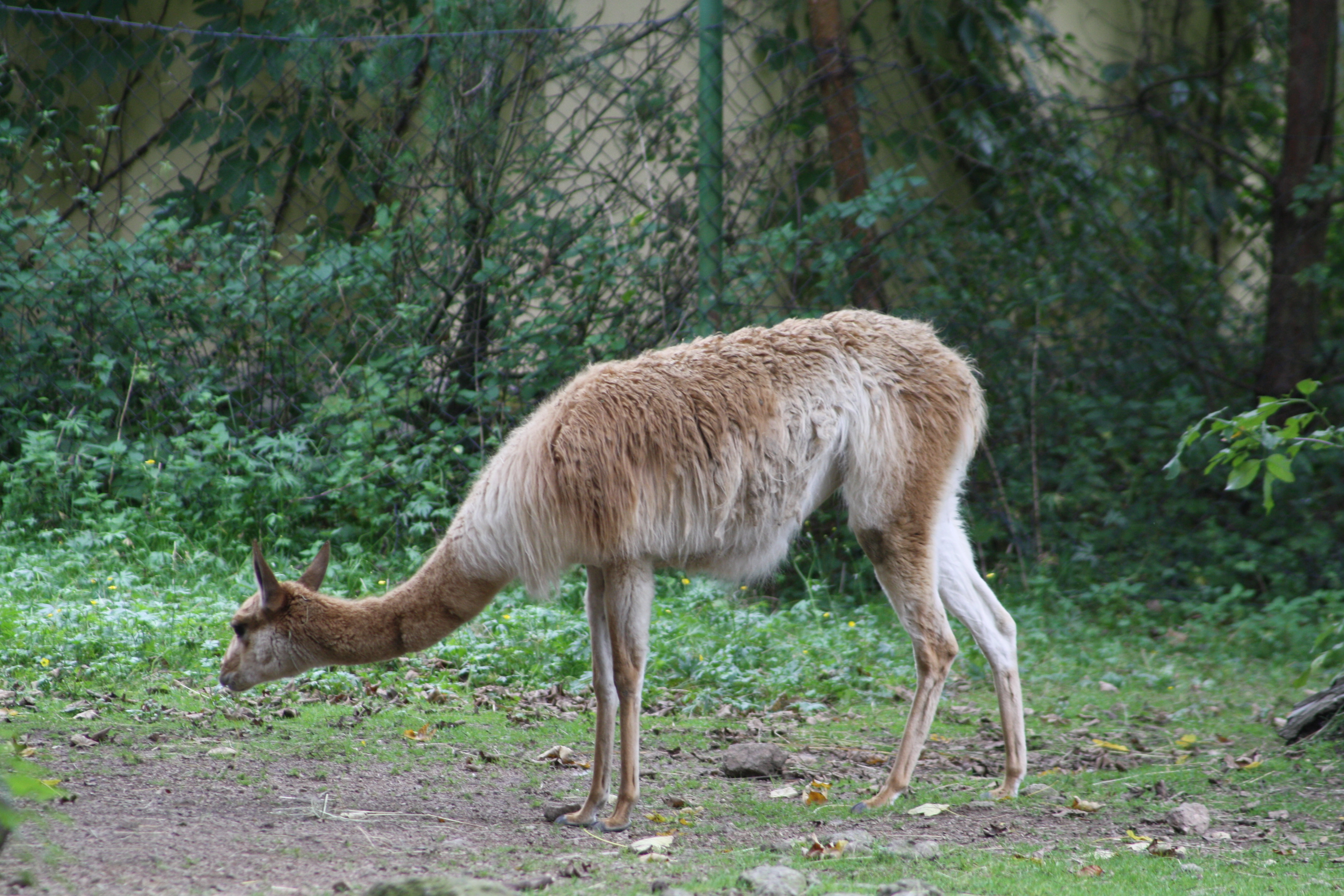
- Vicuña (Lama vicugna)

Scientific classification
- Kingdom: Animalia
- Phylum: Chordata
- Class: Mammalia
- Order: Artiodactyla
- Family: Camelidae
- Subfamily: Camelinae
- Tribe: Lamini; Webb, 1965

Genera
- †Alforjas Harrison, 1979; †Camelops? Leidy, 1854; †Eulamaops Ameghino, 1889; †Hemiauchenia Gervais & Ameghino, 1880; †Palaeolama Gervais, 1869; †Pleiolama Webb & Meachen, 2004; †Vampyrocamelus Marriott et al., 2026; †Aepycamelus MacDonald, 1956; Lama Cuvier, 1800; Vicugna? Gray, 1872

= Lamini =

Lamini Temporal range: Miocene–Recent

Tribe of mammals

Lamini (members are called lamines) is a tribe of the subfamily Camelinae. It contains one extant genus with four species, all exclusively from South America: llamas, alpacas, vicuñas, and guanacos. The former two are domesticated species, while the latter two are only found in the wild. The four species can interbreed and produce fertile offspring. Additionally, there are several extinct genera, and lamines were formerly widespread in North America until the end of the Late Pleistocene.

The digestive system of lamines allows them to digest certain toxins. Lamines also lack a gallbladder.

== Evolutionary history ==
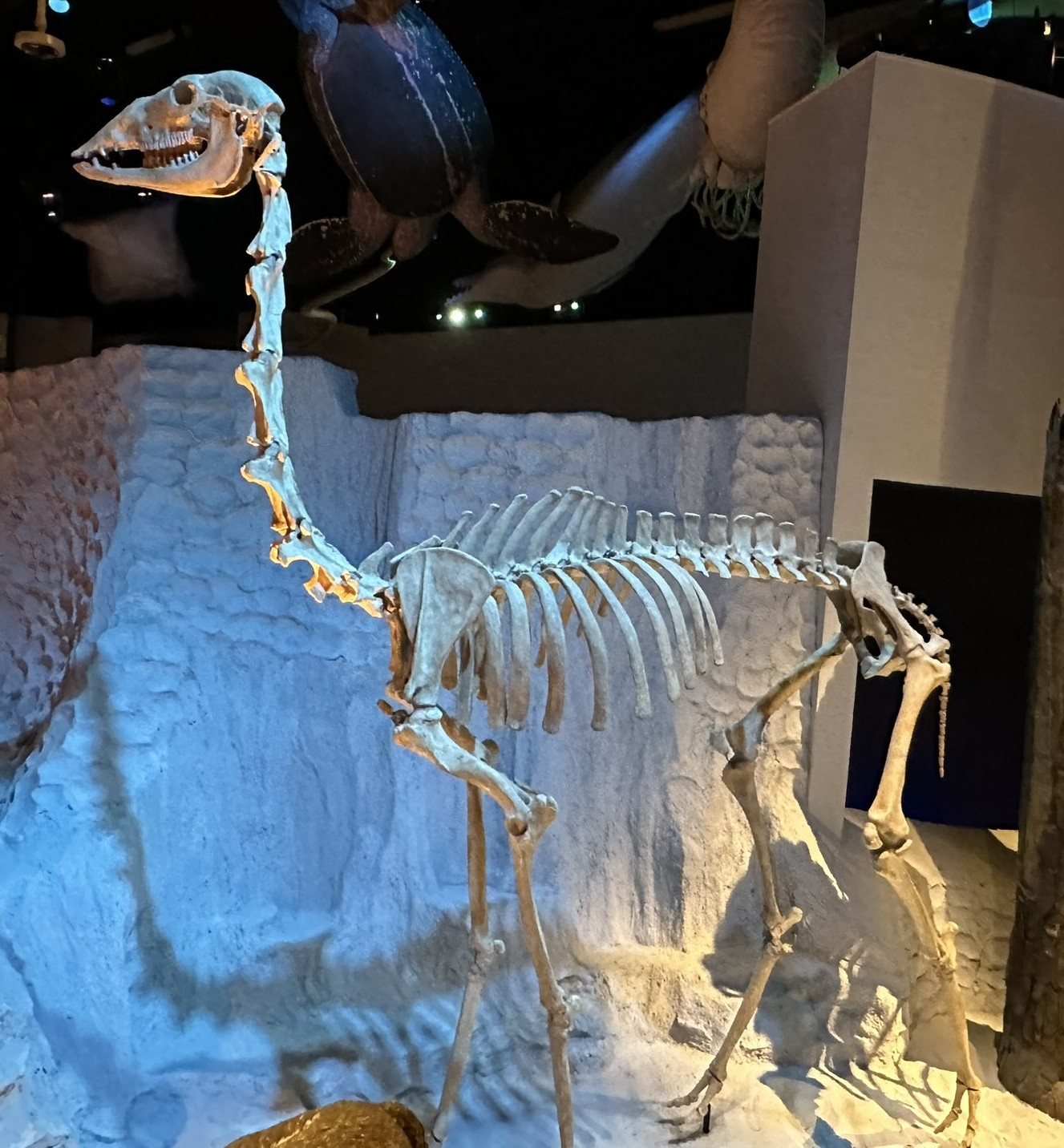
Hemiauchenia, one of the most widespread and successful prehistoric lamines

Lamines originated during the Miocene in North America, and migrated into South America during the Pliocene and Pleistocene as part of the Great American Interchange. Most species of lamines, including the genera Hemiauchenia and Palaeolama and all North American species, became extinct at the end of the Pleistocene around 12,000 years ago as part of the Quaternary extinction event along with most other large mammals in the Americas.

== Characteristics and distribution ==
The llama (Lama glama) is the largest of the extant laminoids and weighs 130–150 kilograms (290–330 lb) with a height of 109–119 cm (43–47 in) at the shoulder. Lamines do not display sexual dimorphism. Llamas are not a natural species; rather, they were domesticated by the Peruvians and Bolivians of the highlands. Commercial trade led to the llama's current abundance in Colombia, Ecuador, Peru, Bolivia, Chile, Paraguay, and northeast Argentina. There are bands of llamas in the United States, Europe, Japan, and New Zealand.

The color and length of the llama's wool is variable, depending on the race. The diameter of llama wool's fiber varies between 20 and 80 micrometers, depending on whether the llamas were raised for its wool or as a pack animal.

The guanaco (Lama guanicoe) is a wild camelid, standing at 100–120 cm (39–47 in) at the shoulder and 150–160 cm (59–63 in) at the head. It can weigh up to 140 kilograms (310 lb). Its pelage is longer than vicuña wool but shorter than that of the alpaca; it is considered to be of excellent quality and has a light brown, reddish, or brown-yellow color. The diameter of its fleece's fibers varies between 16 and 18 micrometers.

90% of the world's guanacos are in Argentina, distributed from the islands of the Beagle Channel and the southern extremity of Patagonia to the Puna grassland in northwestern Argentina. Guanacos can also be found in Bolivia, Chile, Paraguay, and Peru.

The alpaca (Lama pacos), a domestic camelid, weighs between 50 and 65 kg (110 and 143 lb), while its height at the shoulder is 94–104 cm (37–41 in). It is slightly larger than the vicuña. Normally, the alpaca is found in the Andes in Peru and Bolivia, though it also inhabits northern Chile and northwestern Argentina. There are about 3.5 million alpacas in the world. In the 1980s, alpacas started being exported to other countries for farming purposes: they can be found in the United States, Australia, and New Zealand, though the vast majority still reside in South America.

The alpaca is mainly raised for its wool. Out of the domestic camelids, the alpaca produces wool with longer and finer fiber than the llama, with a strand diameter of 18–25 micrometers.

The vicuña (Lama vicugna) is the smallest camelid, with a shoulder height of 75–100 cm (30–39 in) and a weight of 40–60 kg (88–132 lb). Its coat is mainly beige in color and is said to make "the best wool in the world", with the average fiber diameter between 11 and 14 micrometers. Like rodents, the vicuña has continuously-growing incisors. It lives only in areas of high altitude – 3,200 m (10,500 ft) or greater – in the highlands of Argentina, Bolivia, Chile, Peru, and Ecuador.

== See also ==
- Ruminant
- Ungulate
