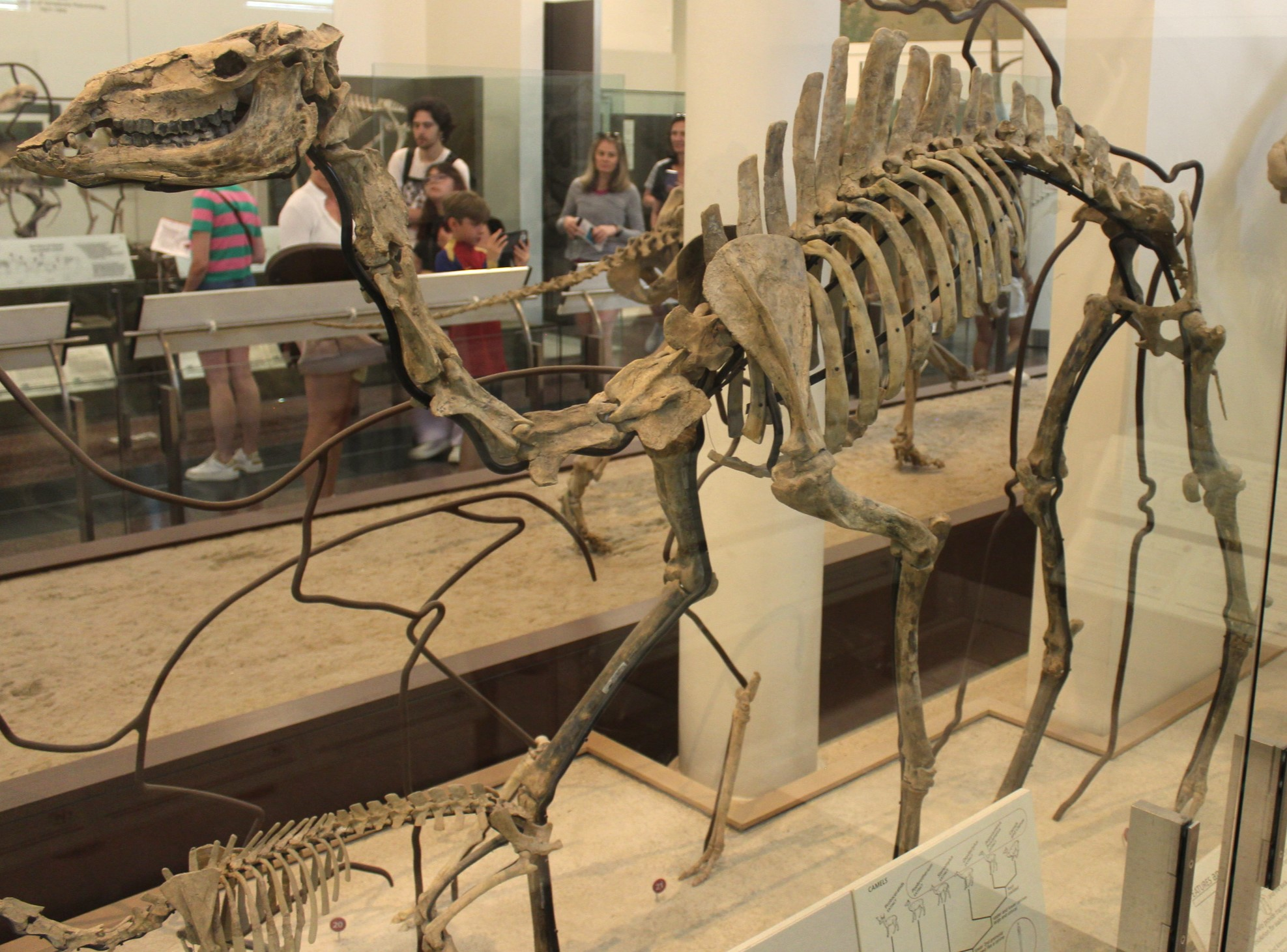
- P. grandis skeleton, American Museum of Natural History

Scientific classification
- Kingdom: Animalia
- Phylum: Chordata
- Class: Mammalia
- Order: Artiodactyla
- Family: Camelidae
- Tribe: Camelini
- Genus: †Procamelus; Leidy, 1858

Type species
- Procamelus occidentalis Leidy 1858

Species
- P. angustidens; P. grandis Gregory 1939; P. leptocolon Matthew 1909; P. occidentalis Leidy 1858; P. robustus

Synonyms
- Homocamelus Leidy 1869

= Procamelus =

Procamelus Temporal range: Mid-Late Miocene (Barstovian-Hemphillian) ~16.3–5.3 Ma

Extinct genus of mammals

Procamelus is an extinct genus of camel endemic to North America. It lived from the Middle to Late Miocene 16.3—5.3 mya, existing for approximately 11 million years. The name is derived from the Greek πρό, meaning "before" or denoting priority of order, and κάμελος ("camel"), thus meaning "fore-camel", "early camel" or "predecessor camel".

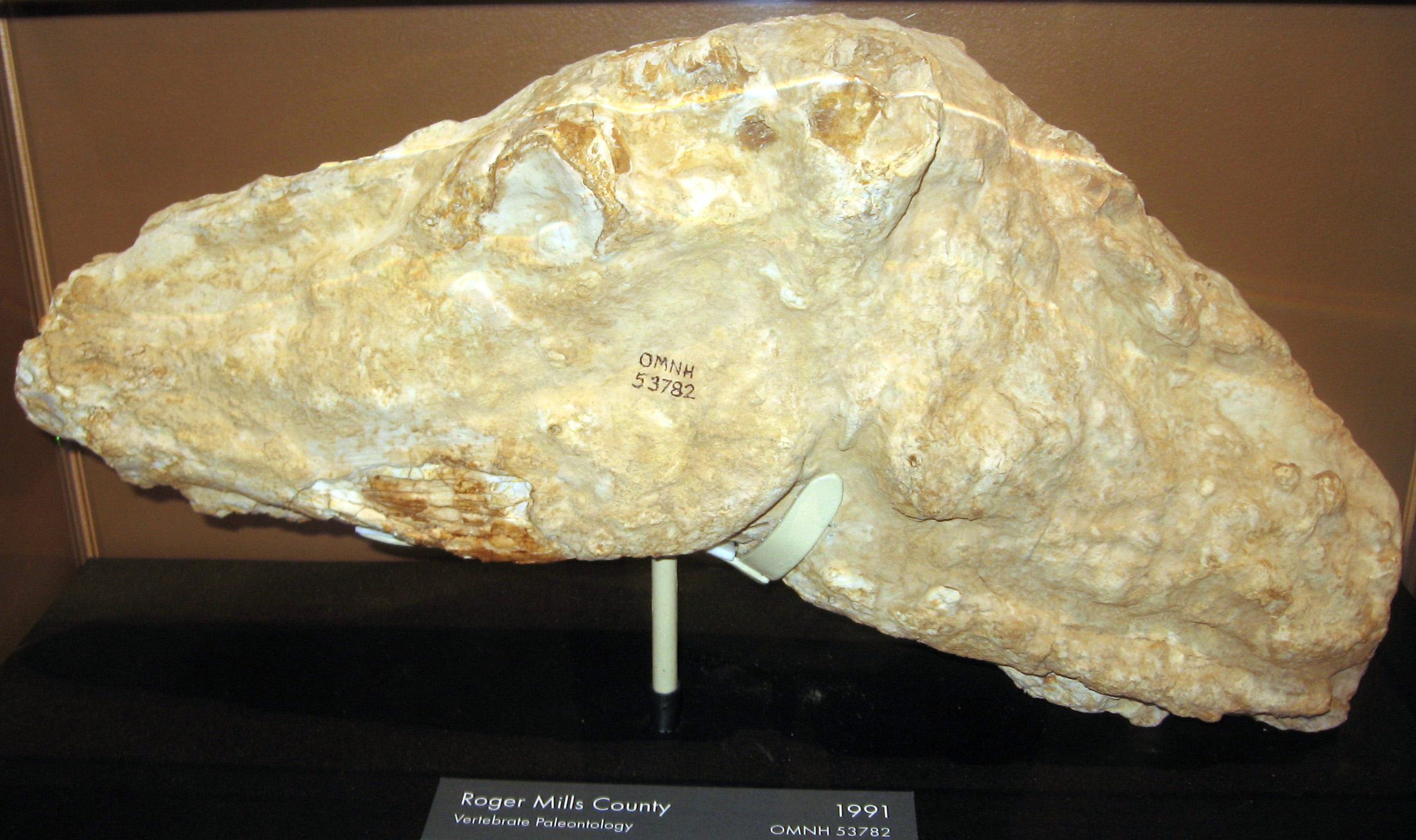
Mummified Procamelus head

It had long legs designed for speed, and was about 1.3 metres (4.3 ft) in height at the shoulder, slightly smaller than a modern llama. Unlike modern camelids, it had a pair of small incisor teeth in the upper jaw. The remaining teeth were large and adapted for eating tough vegetation. The shape of the toes suggests that it possessed foot pads, like modern camels, unlike earlier forms of camelid, which generally had hooves. This would have helped it walk over relatively soft ground. It had a straighter neck than Oxydactylus or Aepycamelus.

== Disputed species ==
At first, Procamelus was used as a "wastebasket taxon" for American Miocene camelids, including species placed today e.g. in Aepycamelus. But there are still some species questionably placed in Procamelus, which are either represented by fragmentary remains, or suspected to belong elsewhere; they are thus considered nomina dubia:

- "P." coconinensis Hay 1921

Described from a molar tooth of strikingly large size and probably from the Pliocene; more likely belongs to Camelops or Megatylopus rather than Procamelus.

- P. gracilis Leidy, 1858

A jawbone piece with some teeth that has crumbled into fragments since its description; possibly just a small individual of Procamelus occidentalis.

- "P." leptognathus Cope 1893

Described from skull pieces, including a jawbone that at a glance appears strikingly slim (leptognathus meaning "narrow-jawed"), but this is actually due to the fossil bones being extremely shattered and distorted. What remains of the teeth does not resemble the conspicuously hypsodont dentition of Procamelus, so this species almost certainly belongs to another genus.

- "P." longurio Hay 1921

From the same deposits as "P." coconinensis, and unlikely to belong into Procamelus due to its Pliocene age. Apparently considerably smaller and more llama-like than "P." coconinensis; might belong into Hemiauchenia or Palaeolama.

- "P." minor (Leidy 1886)

Originally described in genus Auchenia (a synonym of Lama), and only known from a single astragalus bone intermediate in size between Aepycamelus major and Hemiauchenia minima which both occurred in the same deposit. Barely larger than the largest known H. minima specimens, it may be a very large individual of that species.
