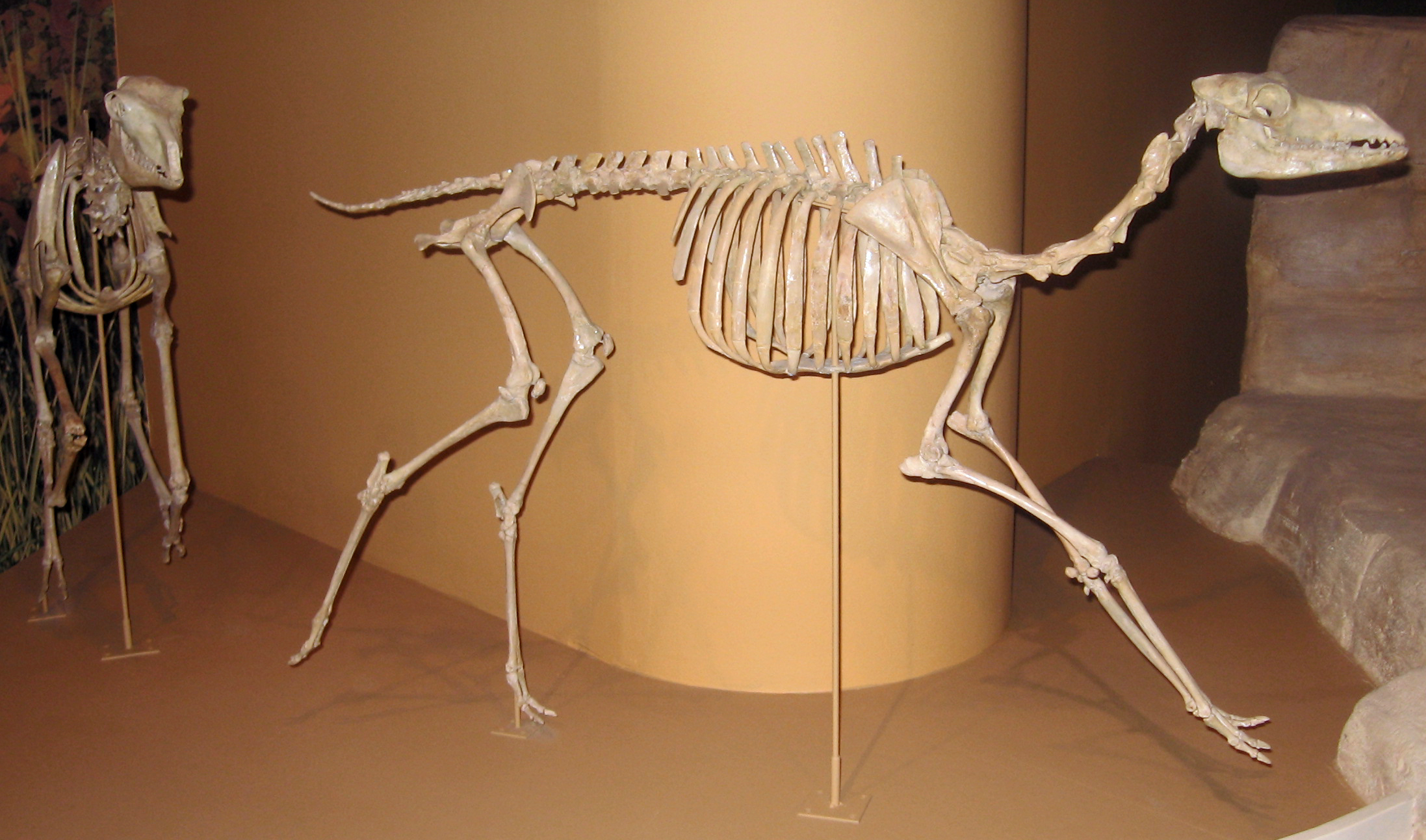
- Skeletons

Scientific classification
- Kingdom: Animalia
- Phylum: Chordata
- Class: Mammalia
- Order: Artiodactyla
- Family: Camelidae
- Genus: †Stenomylus; Peterson 1907

Type species
- †Stenomylus gracilis Peterson, 1907

Other species
- †Stenomylus hitchcocki Loomis, 1910; †Stenomylus keelinensis Frick & Taylor, 1968

= Stenomylus =

Stenomylus Temporal range: Oligocene - early Miocene 23.04–16.3 Ma

Extinct genus of mammals

Stenomylus is an extinct genus of miniature camelid native to North America that is known from the Oligocene and Miocene epochs(23.1~16.3Ma). Its name is derived from the Greek στενός (stenós, "narrow") and μύλος (mýlos, "molar").

Stenomylus was extremely diminutive compared to other ancient and modern camelids, standing only 2 feet (61 cm) tall on average. It was a slender animal with a long neck, having some resemblance to a modern gazelle. Based on theories about its biomechanics, unlike modern camelids, Stenomylus lacked padding on its hooves.

== Description ==
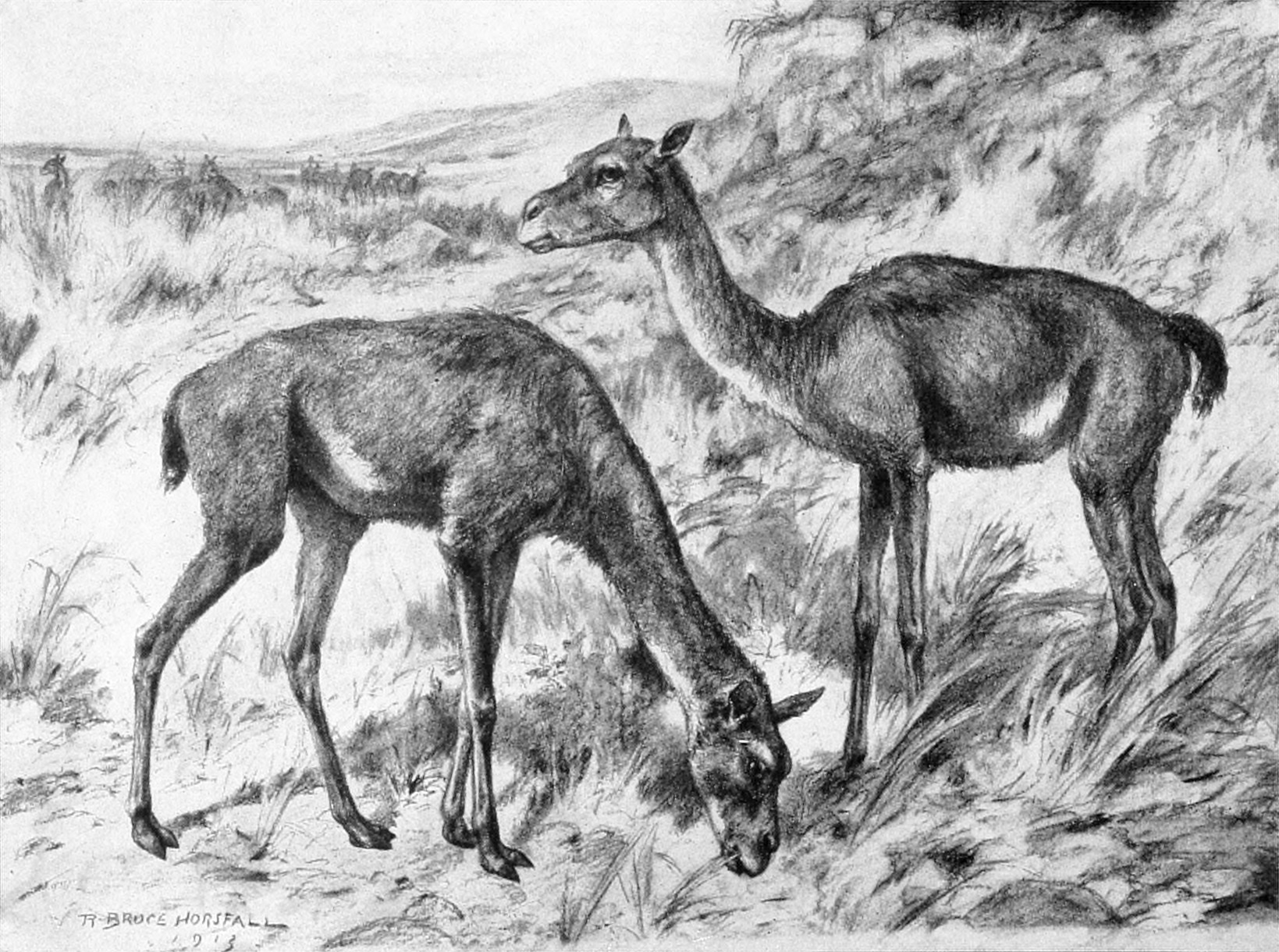
1913 illustration.

Despite being a camelid, the gracile Stenomylus looked very similar to today's gazelles. The legs, were extremely elongated and bore only two toes; the legs had separate metacarpal but some species showed an incipient fusing of metacarpals, especially in the metatarsus. The nail phalanges suggest the presence of hooves similar to those of deer, and not of fleshy pads like those of today's camels.

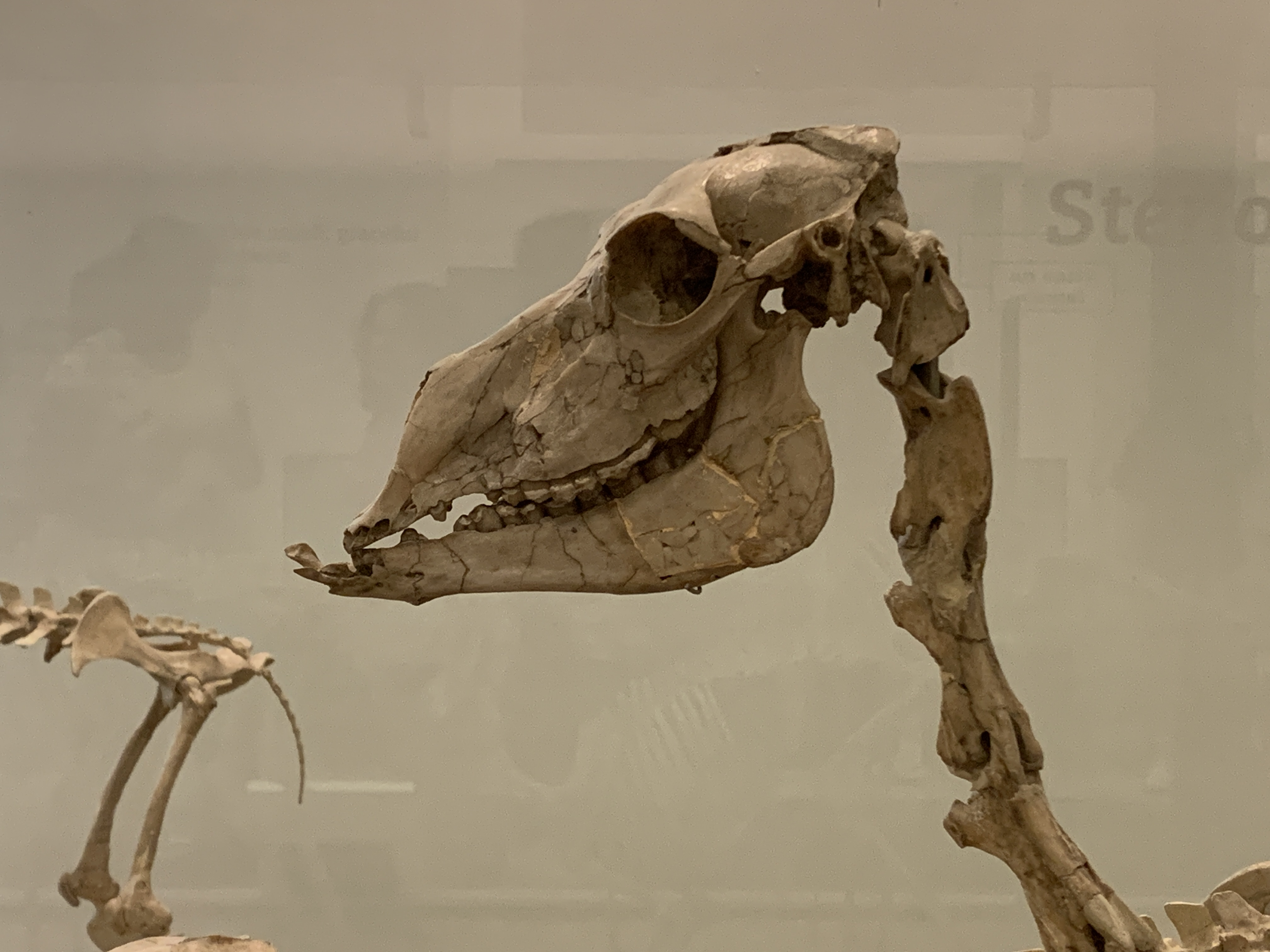
S. hitchcocki skull at the AMNH.

The neck of Stenomylus was greatly elongated, making it vaguely similar to the modern gerenuk. The head was small, rounded and with a short muzzle. The nasal bones, set quite far back in the skull, suggest the presence of a small proboscis or at least of muscular prehensile lips. This characteristic is even more accentuated in the related (and slightly later) Rakomylus. The dentition of Stenomylus was very specialized: the anterior teeth were small, and the third incisor, as well as the first premolar, were similar to the canine. The upper second and third premolars were very small, and there was a diastema between the first and second premolars. Both the upper and lower molars were hypsodont in structure, and possessed deep roots even in mature individuals.

== Classification ==
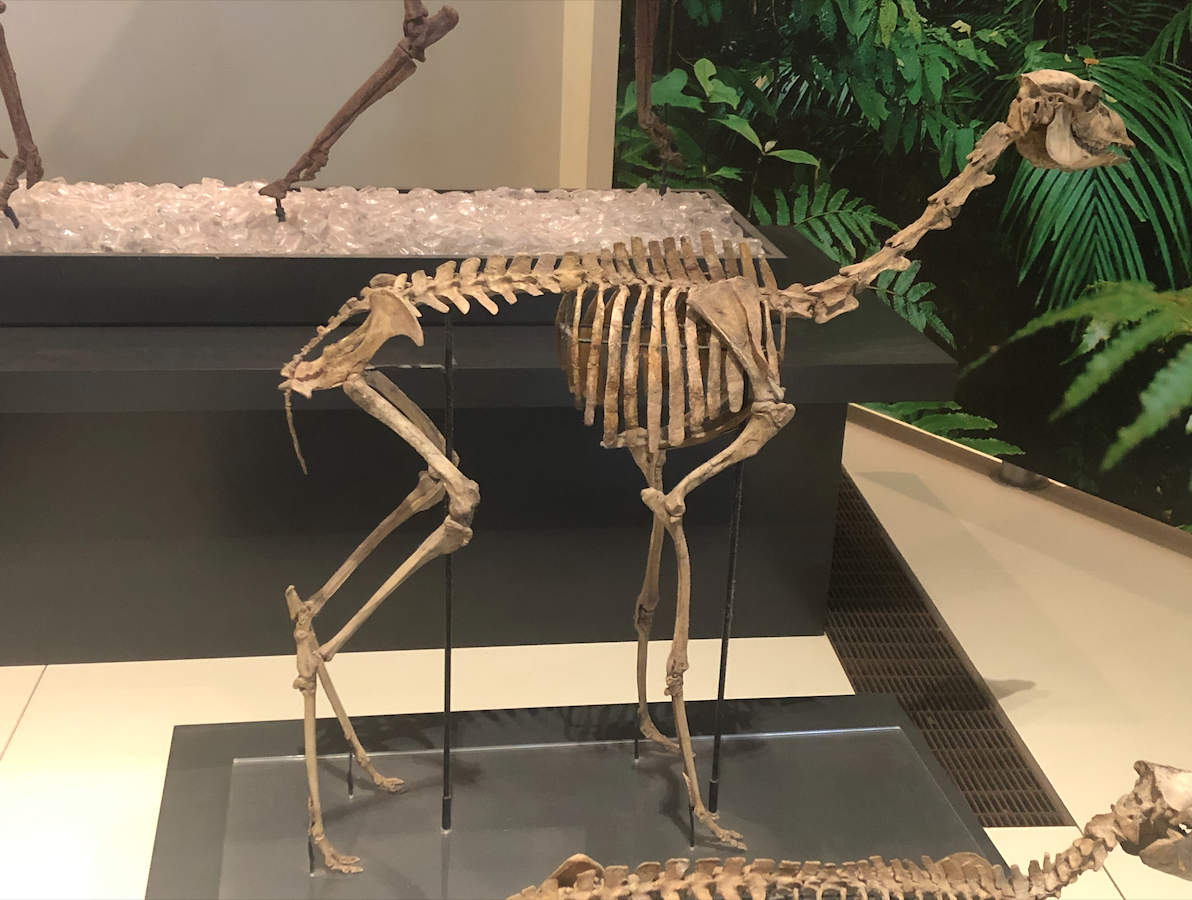
Skeleton of Stenomylus hitchcocki at the Royal Ontario Museum.

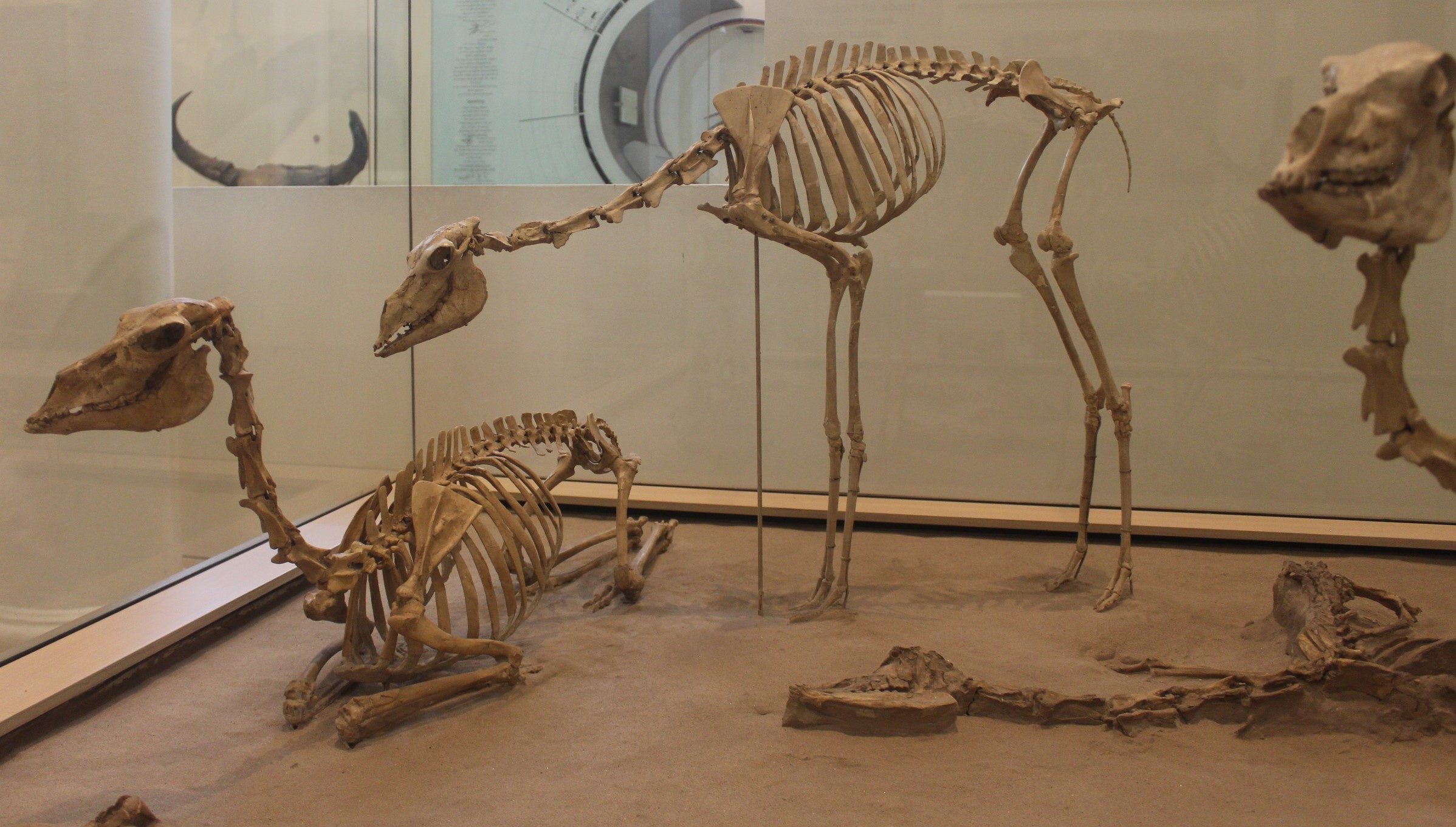
Stenomylus hitchcocki

The genus Stenomylus was first described by Peterson in 1907, on the basis of fossil remains found in lower Miocene soils of Nebraska. The type species is Stenomylus gracilis. Another well-known species is Stenomylus hitchcocki, known from numerous specimens found in the Agate Springs area in Nebraska, in a quarry later known as "Stenomylus Quarry". Stenomylus is a very specialized genus of camelids, classified in a separate subfamily, the Stenomylinae, which likely originated at the end of the Oligocene. The specialization in the lengthening of the legs and the retraction of the nasal bones, as well as in the teeth, are accentuated even more in later forms such as Rakomylus.
