= Megatylopus =

Megatylopus Temporal range: Late Miocene - Early Pliocene (Hemphillian - early Blancan)
- Diagram of the holotype skull of Megatylopus gigas

Scientific classification
- Kingdom: Animalia
- Phylum: Chordata
- Class: Mammalia
- Order: Artiodactyla
- Family: Camelidae
- Subfamily: Camelinae
- Tribe: Camelini
- Genus: †Megatylopus; Matthew & Cook, 1909

Type species
- †Pliauchenia gigas Matthew & Cook, 1909

Species
- M. gigas (Matthew & Cook, 1909); M. cochrani (Hibbard & Riggs, 1949); M. matthewi Webb, 1965

Extinct genus of mammals

Megatylopus is an extinct genus of large camel, endemic to North America from the Late Miocene to Pliocene (Hemphillian to early Blancan). Megatylopus is one of the four genera of late Neogene camelins commonly known as "giant camels", alongside Megacamelus, Gigantocamelus, and Titanotylopus. Of these four, Megatylopus was the first to appear in the fossil record, and it seems to be the least specialized. It was also the most widespread and diverse, with three valid species. It stood about 3.4 m (11 ft) tall at the shoulder.

The type species, M. gigas, was originally described from the Snake Creek beds of Nebraska, and has since been reported from Colorado, Montana, Idaho, Arizona, and Florida. It is the largest and most well-described species in the genus.

M. matthewi was originally described from Texas, but is also known from California, New Mexico, Arizona, Oklahoma, and Guanajuato in Mexico. M. cochrani is the youngest species, based on jaw fragments from Keefe Canyon in the Rexroad Formation of Kansas, as well as other rare fossils in Nebraska and Washington. A supposed fourth species, M. primaevus, is actually a junior synonym of Aepycamelus major, the slender "giraffe camel".
