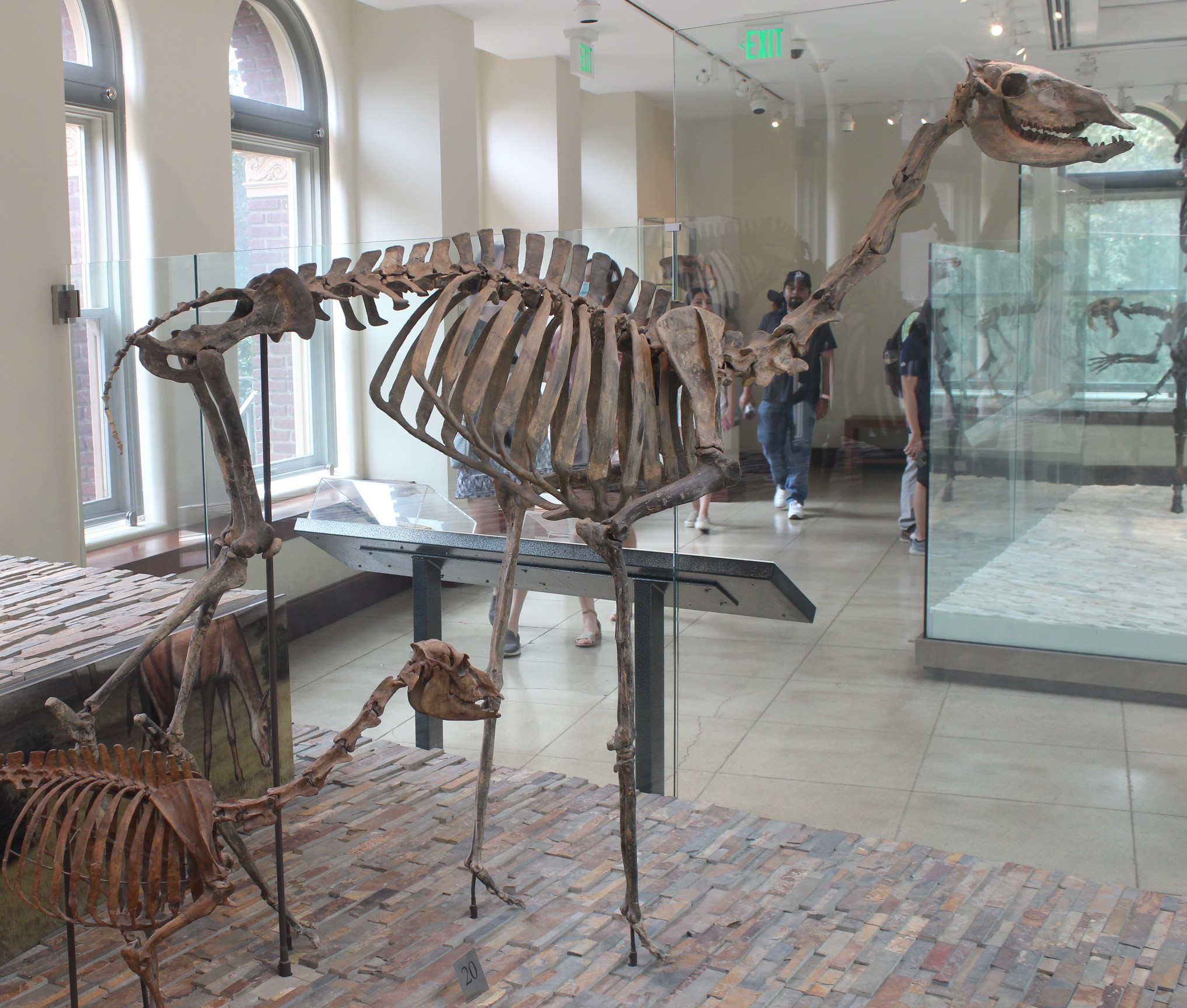
- Skeleton of Oxydactylus campestris in the Natural History Museum of Los Angeles County

Scientific classification
- Domain: Eukaryota
- Kingdom: Animalia
- Phylum: Chordata
- Class: Mammalia
- Order: Artiodactyla
- Family: Camelidae
- Genus: †Oxydactylus; Peterson 1904

Type species
- †Oxydactylus longipes

Species
- O. lacota Matthew & Macdonald 1960; O. longipes Peterson 1904; O. wyomingensis Loomis 1936

= Oxydactylus =

Oxydactylus Temporal range: Late Oligocene – Middle Miocene, 28.4–13.7 Ma

Extinct genus of mammals

Oxydactylus is an extinct genus of camelid endemic to North America. It lived from the Late Oligocene to the Middle Miocene (28.4–13.7 mya), existing for approximately 14 million years. The name is from the Ancient Greek οξύς (oxys, "sharp")and δάκτυλος (daktylos, "finger").

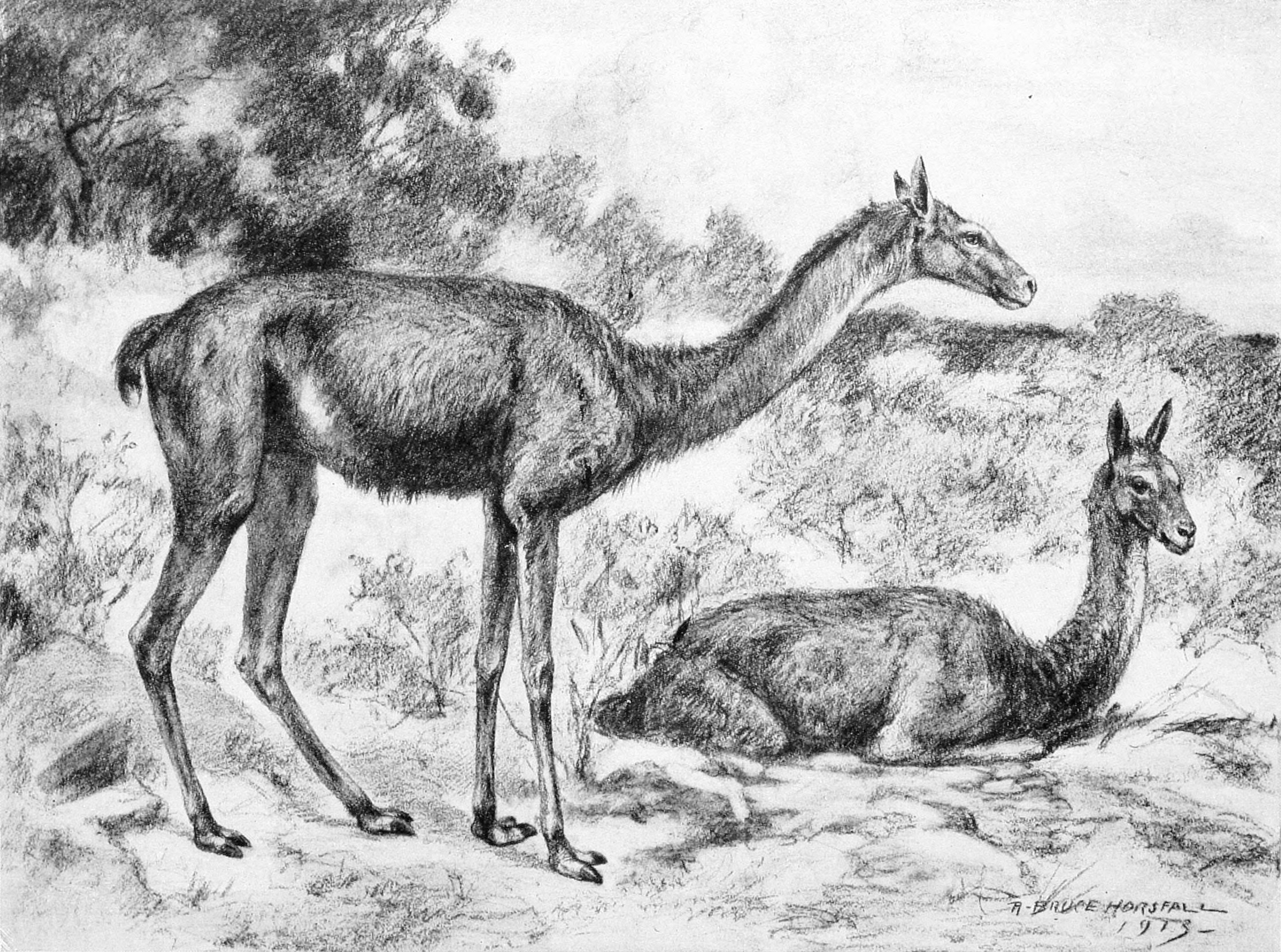
O. longipes restoration

They had very long legs and necks, and were probably adapted to eating high vegetation, much like modern giraffes. Unlike modern camelids, they had hooves, rather than tough sole-pads, and splayed toes.
