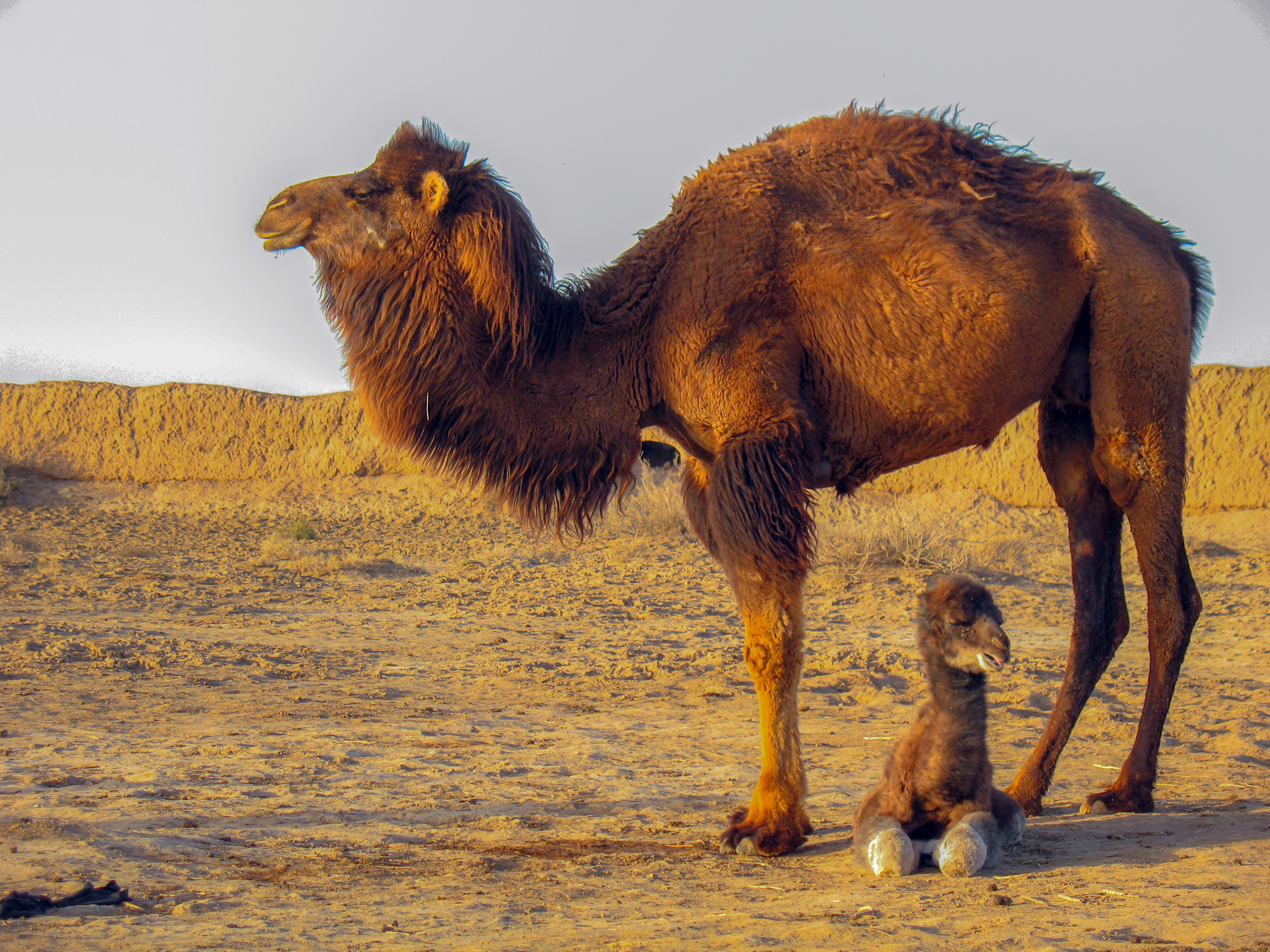

Scientific classification
- Kingdom: Animalia
- Phylum: Chordata
- Class: Mammalia
- Order: Artiodactyla
- Family: Camelidae
- Subfamily: Camelinae; Zittel, 1893

Tribes
- †Honeycamelus; Camelini; Lamini

= Camelinae =

Camelinae Temporal range: Early Miocene - Recent

Subfamily of mammals

Camelinae is a subfamily of artiodactyls of the family Camelidae. Camelinae include the tribes Camelini and Lamini. A third tribe, Camelopini, created by S. D. Webb (1965), was formerly included, but was discarded by J. A. Harrison (1979) after it was shown to be polyphyletic: it consisted of the genera Camelops and Megatylopus, which were moved to Camelini and Lamini respectively.

== Taxonomy ==
Camelinae was named by Gray (1821). Its type is Camelus. It was assigned to Camelidae by Stanley et al. (1994) and Ruez (2005).
