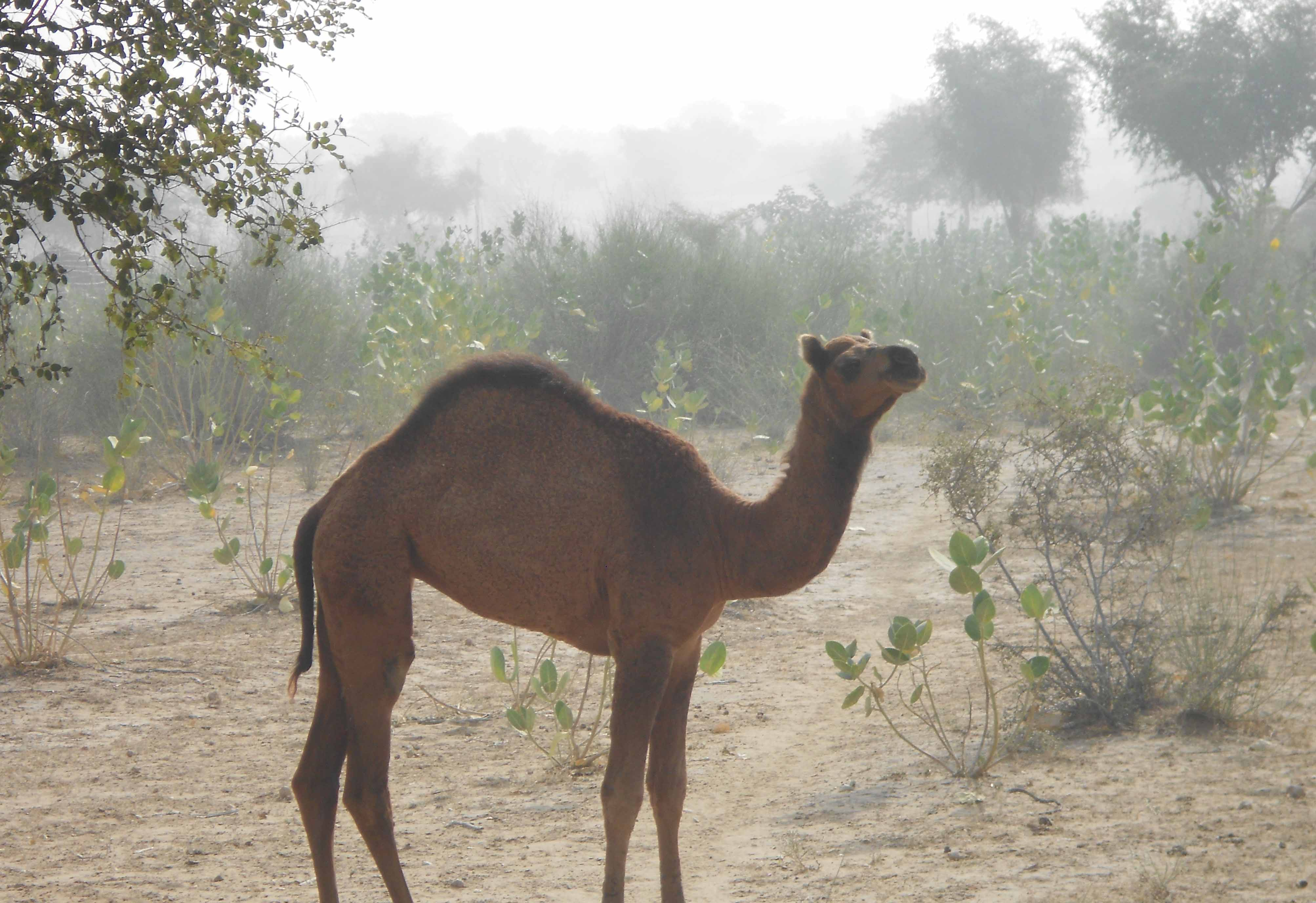
- Camelus dromedarius

Scientific classification
- Kingdom: Animalia
- Phylum: Chordata
- Class: Mammalia
- Order: Artiodactyla
- Family: Camelidae
- Subfamily: Camelinae
- Tribe: Camelini; Gray, 1821

Genera
- Camelus; †Camelops; †Gigantocamelus; †Megacamelus; †Megatylopus; †Paracamelus; †Procamelus; †Titanotylopus

= Camelini =

Camelini Temporal range: Miocene–Recent

Tribe of mammals

Camelini is a tribe of camelids including all camelids more closely related to modern camels (Camelus) than to Lamini (which contains llamas, alpacas, vicuñas, and guanacos), from which camelines split approximately 17 million years ago. The tribe originated in North America, with the genus Paracamelus migrating over the Bering Land Bridge into Eurasia during the Late Miocene, around 6 million years ago, becoming ancestral to Camelus. The last member of Camelini in North America was Camelops, which became extinct as part of the Quaternary extinction event at the end of the Late Pleistocene, around 12,000 years ago.
