= Rock Creek =

Rock Creek or Rockcreek may refer to:

== Rivers ==
- Rock Creek (British Columbia), Canada
- Rock Creek (California), U.S.
- Rock Creek (Fountain Creek tributary), Colorado, U.S.
- Rock Creek (Kankakee River tributary), Illinois, U.S.
- Rock Creek (Wapsipinicon River tributary), Iowa, U.S.
- Rock Creek (upper Missouri River tributary), Iowa and Missouri, U.S.
- Rock Creek (Potomac River tributary), Maryland and the District of Columbia, U.S.
- Rock Creek (Minnesota), U.S.
- Rock Creek (Little St. Francis River tributary), Missouri, U.S.
- Rock Creek (lower Missouri River tributary), Missouri, U.S.
- Rock Creek (South Fork South Fabius River tributary), Missouri, U.S.
- Rock Creek (Clark Fork River tributary), a Clark Fork River tributary in Montana, U.S.
- Rock Creek (Saskatchewan–Montana), a Milk River tributary, Canada and U.S.
- Rock Creek (Clarks Fork Yellowstone River tributary), Montana and Wyoming, U.S.
- Rock Creek (Nebraska), U.S.
- Rock Creek (Niobrara River tributary), a stream in Rock County, Nebraska, U.S.
- Rock Creek (Catlow Valley), Oregon, U.S.
- Rock Creek (John Day River tributary), Oregon, U.S.
- Rock Creek (Monocacy River tributary), Pennsylvania, U.S.
- Rock Creek (Tunkhannock Creek tributary), Pennsylvania, U.S.
- Rock Creek (Palouse River tributary), Washington, U.S.
- Rock Creek (Clear Creek tributary), Wyoming, U.S.
- Rock Creek (Medicine Bow River tributary), Wyoming, U.S.
- Rock Creek Overland Stage Station, Wyoming, U.S.

== Communities ==
=== United States ===
- Rock Creek, Alabama, a census-designated place
- Rock Creek, California, a former settlement
- Rock Creek, Illinois (disambiguation)
- Rock Creek, Kansas, an unincorporated community in Rock Creek Township
- Rock Creek, Minnesota, a city
- Rock Creek, Ohio, a village
- Rock Creek, Gilliam County, Oregon, an unincorporated community
- Rockcreek, Oregon, a census-designated place
- Rock Creek, Texas, an unincorporated community
- Rock Creek, Boone County, West Virginia, an unincorporated community
- Rock Creek, Raleigh County, West Virginia, an unincorporated community
- Rock Creek, Wisconsin, a town

=== Canada ===
- Rock Creek, British Columbia, an unincorporated settlement

== Other uses ==
- Rock Creek Badlands, Saskatchewan, Canada
- Rock Creek Canyon Bridge, British Columbia, Canada
- Rock Creek Cemetery, Washington, D.C.
- Rock Creek Gold Rush, near the town of Rock Creek, British Columbia
- Rock Creek Methodist Episcopal Church, in Maryland
- Rock Creek Park, Washington, D.C., an urban park
- Rock Creek Park Golf Course, Washington, D.C.
- Rock Creek Railway, a historic electric streetcar company in Washington, D.C.
- Rock Creek Roadless Area, Wyoming
- Rock Creek State Park, Iowa
- Rock Creek Station, a Pony Express station in Nebraska
- Rock Creek Station and Stricker Homesite, a historic site in Idaho
- Rock Creek USD 323, a school district in Kansas
- Rock Creek Trail, Colorado
- Rock Creek Wilderness, Oregon

== See also ==
- Rock Creek Gardens, Washington, D.C., a neighborhood
- Rock Creek Park, Colorado, an unincorporated community and census-designated place
- Rock Creek Woods Historic District, Maryland
- Rock/Creek, an outdoor specialty retailer
- Rock Creek and Potomac Parkway, Washington, D.C.
- Rock Creek Township (disambiguation)
