= Rock Creek, Oregon =

Rock Creek or Rockcreek, Oregon may refer to the following in the U.S. state of Oregon:

== Communities ==
- Rock Creek, Gilliam County, Oregon, an unincorporated community
- Rockcreek, Oregon, a census-designated place in Washington County

== Streams ==
- Rock Creek (Catlow Valley), Oregon
- Rock Creek (John Day River tributary), Oregon
- Rock Creek (Lane County, Oregon)
- Rock Creek (Wasco County, Oregon)
- Rock Creek (Washington County, Oregon)
