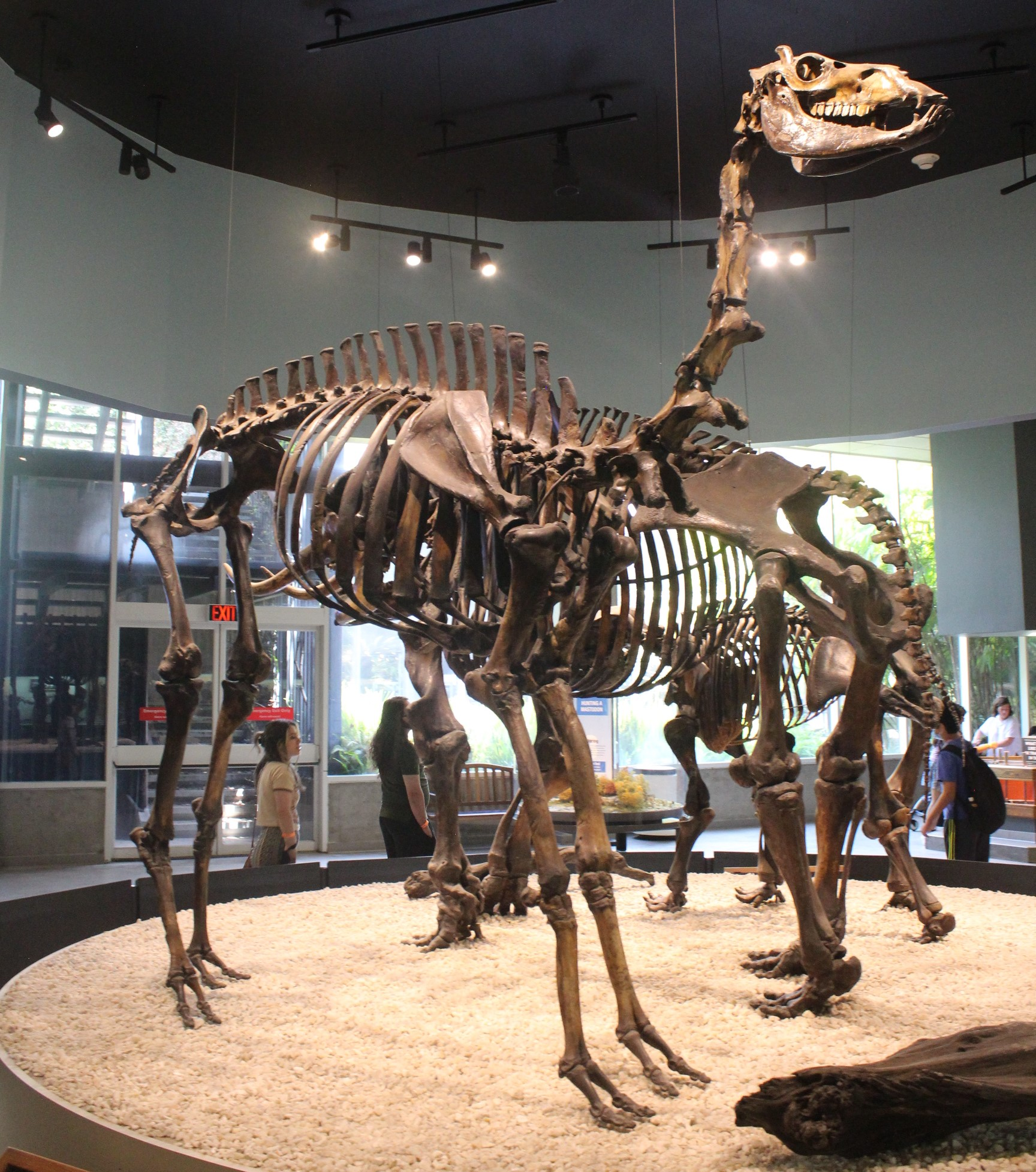
- Mounted skeleton of Camelops hesternus in the George C. Page Museum, Los Angeles

Scientific classification
- Kingdom: Animalia
- Phylum: Chordata
- Class: Mammalia
- Order: Artiodactyla
- Family: Camelidae
- Subfamily: Camelinae
- Tribe: Camelini
- Genus: †Camelops; Leidy, 1854

Species
- †C. kansanus Leidy, 1854 (type species, nomen dubium); †C. hesternus Leidy, 1873; †C. minidokae? Hay, 1927

= Camelops =

Camelops Temporal range: Middle Pliocene to Late Pleistocene, 3.2–0.013 Ma

Extinct genus of mammals

Camelops is an extinct genus of cameline that lived in North and Central America from the middle Pliocene (from around 4-3.2 million years ago) to the end of the Pleistocene (around 13-12,000 years ago). There is some debate over whether it is more closely related to camelins (living camels and kin) or to lamines (llamas, alpacas, vicuñas, and guanacos). Although its skeletal anatomy is generally more similar to lamines, genetic evidence supports closer affinities to camels. Its name is derived from the Ancient Greek κάμηλος (cámēlos, "camel") and ὄψ (óps, "face"), i.e. "camel-face". Camelops lived across Western North America, ranging from the Pacific Coast to the Great Plains, southwards to Honduras and northwards to Alaska. Camelops became extinct as part of the end-Pleistocene extinction event, along with most large mammals across the Americas. The extinctions followed the arrival of humans to the Americas, and evidence has been found indicating that humans butchered Camelops, suggesting that hunting may have been a factor in its extinction.

== Taxonomy and evolution ==
=== History of research ===
Camelops was first named by Joseph Leidy in 1854, based on a partial maxilla (upper jawbone), that was found in a gravel drift somewhere in the Kansas Territory, with Leidy naming the type species Camelops kansanus in the same publication based on the maxilla. Later authors have judged that while the jawbone undoubtedly represents Camelops, it is too fragmentary to be diagnostic to species, making C. kansanus a nomen dubium. Later in 1874, Leidy named the species Camelops hesternus, based on teeth found in a gravel deposit in Arroyo Las Positas in Livermore Valley, Alameda County in the southern Bay Area of California. Several other species, including Camelops sulcatus, originally described as Holomeniscus sulcatus by Edward Drinker Cope in 1893 based on a partial left mandible, found at Rock Creek, Texas, as well as Camelops huerfanensis (originally Auchenia huerfanensis) described by Francis Whittemore Cragin in 1892 based on remains found along the Huerfano River in Colorado (as well as its claimed subspecies Camelops huerfanensis dallasi named by Richard Swann Lull in 1921 for remains collected along the Trinity River in northeast Texas), Camelops aransas named by Oliver Perry Hay in 1926 for remains including a partial right mandible found on a bank of the Aransas River in southeast Texas, and Camelops traviswhitei named by Mooser and Dalquist in 1975 from remains found in Aguascalientes in central Mexico, are now regarded as junior synonyms of C. hesternus.

Another species, C. minidokiae, named by Hay in 1927 for jaw and teeth remains found in a gravel bed near Minidoka, Idaho, has been suggested to also be potentially valid, given its apparently smaller size than C. hesternus, though other authors have suggested that it is another synonym for C. hesternus. This species is primarily recorded during the Irvingtonian (Early-Middle Pleistocene), though some remains of the species have been reported from the Rancholabrean (late Middle-Late Pleistocene).

In addition, there are numerous nomina dubia in genus Camelops, most described in the late 19th to early 20th century from very fragmentary remains such as isolated teeth: Leidy in 1870 named C. californica and C. niobrarensis (initially Auchenia californica and A. niobrarensis). Cope in 1878 described C. vitikerianus (at first as Auchenia vitikerianus, then moved to Holomeniscus by Cope in 1884, and placed in Tanupolama as T. vitikeriana by Elftman in 1931); in 1884 Cope also established C. conidens and C. longirostris, which he placed in genus Eschatius at that time. Hay named C. nitidus in 1920, and in 1921 established C. arctoamericanus and C. maximus (which he assigned to the extant genus Camelus); in 1927 he described C. arenarum, C. nevadanus and C. vacondae. All these supposed species have not been considered recognizably distinct since Webb's review in 1965.

Finally, there is an enigmatic genus "Megalomeryx", which was established by Leidy in 1858 for a few specimens from the Niobrara River valley that he believed to come from a Miocene camelid of huge size, supposedly much larger than Camelops. Leidy described two teeth and hinted at additional associated remains, but only one very worn molar tooth (specimen USNM V155) could still be found in 2026. While the genus name "Megalomeryx" was well-accepted by late-19th-century authors, it was abandoned entirely once it became clear that the tooth is not diagnostic, that Leidy's measurements were exaggerated, and that the deposits it came from are not determinable; "Megalomeryx" is thus not only a nomen dubium but a nomen oblitum today. In fact, it is not even certain that the single remaining fossil tooth is from a camelid at all, and not from a bison or even a deer, because it is about as long as a Camelops molar, but about twice as wide.

Some scientific publications have used the informal names "western camel" and "yesterday's camel" for Camelops.

=== Evolution ===
The family Camelidae, which contains the living camels, as well as lamines (the tribe Lamini, which includes the llama, guanaco, alpaca and vicuña), first emerged in North America during the Eocene, around 46-42 million years ago, reaching its apex of diversity during the Miocene epoch (23-5.3 million years ago). The two modern tribes of Camelidae, Camelini and Lamini, are suggested to have diverged during this period, around 17.5-16 million years ago. Living camels are thought to descend from Paracamelus, which crossed the Bering Land Bridge into Eurasia from North America during the Late Miocene, around 6 million years ago. Although historically often assigned to Lamini, ancient DNA obtained from Camelops indicates that it is a member of Camelini more closely related to living camels than to lamines, making it a true camel, with an estimated divergence from living camels around 11-10 million years ago. A few anatomical studies also classify it within Camelini.

Phylogenetic relationships of Camelops compared to living and recently extinct camels, after Yuan et al. (2024).

- Camelidae
  - Lamini
  - Camelini
    - †Camelops hesternus
    - Camelus
      - Camelus dromedarius (dromedary)
      - - †Camelus knoblochi
        - Camelus ferus (wild Bactrian camel)
        - Camelus bactrianus (domestic Bactrian camel)

The oldest fossils of Camelops are known from southern North America, dating to around 4-3.2 million years ago during the Pliocene epoch. During the Pliocene and Early Pleistocene epochs (Blancan-Irvingtonian) other camels, such as Gigantocamelus, Blancocamelus, Titanotylopus and cf. Paracamelus were also present in North America, but by the Late Pleistocene (Rancholabrean), Camelops represented the last remaining camel in the Americas.

== Description ==
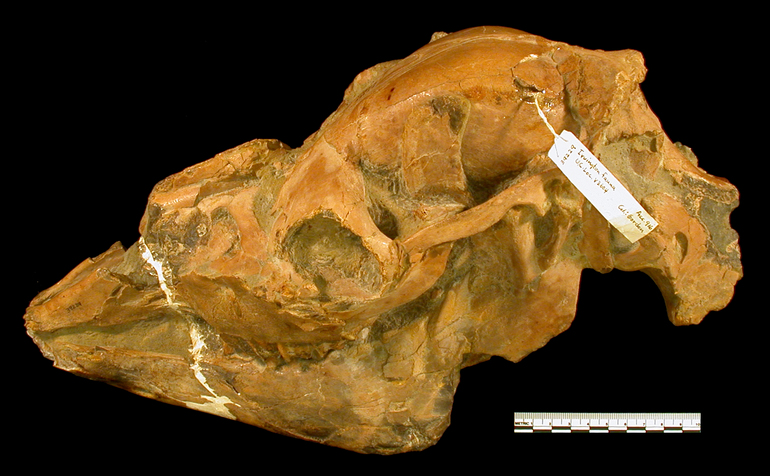
C. minidokae skull

Camelops hesternus was a large camel with a bodyform similar to a living dromedary, reaching a shoulder height of 2.3 m (7 ft 7 in) with body mass estimates ranging from 437 kilograms (963 lb) to 826 kilograms (1,821 lb), to around 1,000 kilograms (2,200 lb), though the size of the species was variable, with individuals known from the far north of the species range in Alaska and Yukon being considerably smaller than those from elsewhere. Whether Camelops had humps or not like living camels is uncertain. The skull has 1 incisor, 1 canine, 2 premolars and 3 molars in each half of the upper jaw, and 3 incisors, 1 canine, 1 premolar and 3 molars in each half of the lower jaw. The upper first premolar and both upper and lower second premolars are absent, with the lower first premolar usually absent and only occasionally present. The molar and premolar teeth are very high-crowned (hypsodont), with the molars being slender relative to their length, with the canines, upper third premolar and lower fourth premolar being reduced in size. The premaxilla bone is robust, with the rostrum of the skull being elongate, with the facial region of the skull not exhibiting considerable shortening. The nasal bones are strongly arched. The brain is relatively large, estimated at 990 grams (2.18 lb). The mandible is relatively deep. The limbs are relatively elongate (around 20% longer than those of living dromedaries) but robust. The metapodial bones are robust and relatively short.

== Distribution, habitat and ecology ==
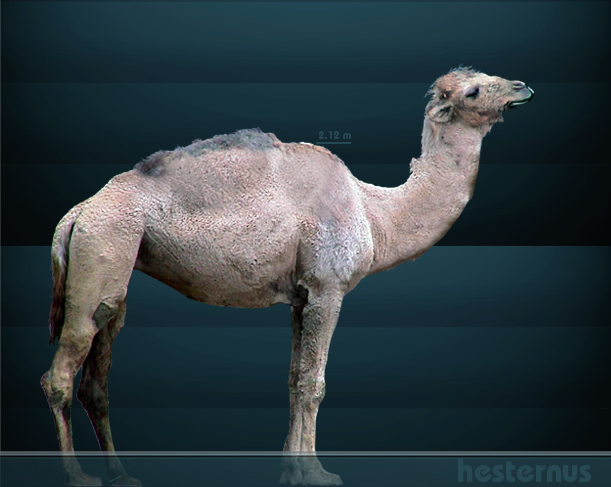
Life restoration of C. hesternus

During the Pleistocene, Camelops is known from fossils across western North America, ranging from California, Oregon and Washington State, eastwards to South Dakota, Nebraska, Kansas, Oklahoma and Texas, with rarer records further east, including near the Missouri-Illinois border. Southwards Camelops ranged to Honduras in Central America. The northernmost records of Camelops are known from Alaska and Yukon, but it probably only occupied this region during warm interglacial intervals, before becoming extirpated from the region during glacial periods (in the case of the Last Glacial Period prior to 50,000 years ago), as is thought for some other species whose remains are also rarely found in the region, such as the ground sloth Megalonyx jeffersoni, mastodons and Castoroides giant beavers. Across its range it inhabited a wide variety of habitats, from subtropical environments, to tundra, though it seems to have primarily lived in open habitats. In parts of its range Camelops hesternus co-occurred alongside the lamines Hemiauchenia and Palaeolama.

An isotopic analysis study including specimens across the species range concluded that Camelops hesternus was a browser that consumed shrubbery, including species with a both a C_{3} and C_{4} type carbon fixation, as well as possibly those with Crassulacean acid metabolism. Plants consumed by Camelops are suggested to include saltbrush (Atriplex), a plant also commonly found in the diet of living camels. Other studies, utilizing isotope and dental microwear analysis of specimens from California and Mexico, have supported a browsing or mixed feeding diet for Camelops, but a 2021 dental wear analysis study suggested that in some locations such as in Nebraska, Camelops hesternus engaged in grazing, sometimes predominantly so, suggesting that Camelops hesternus was a flexible feeder.

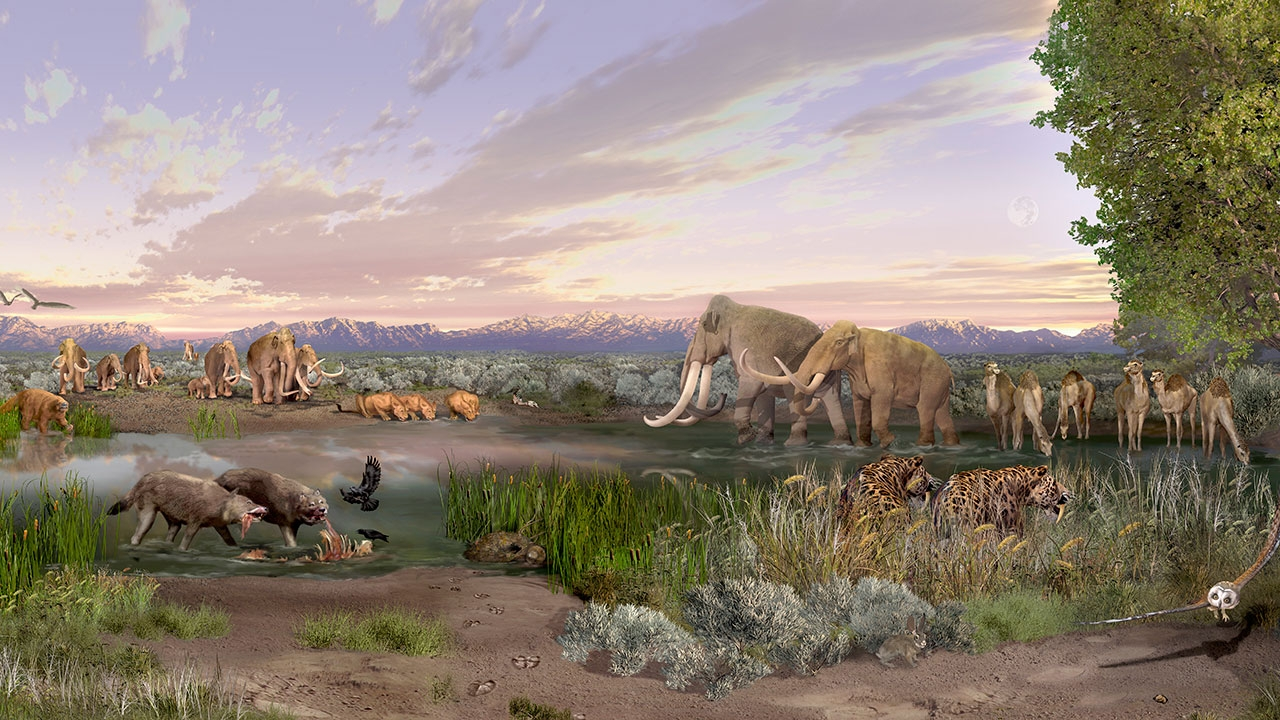
Environment of what is now White Sands National Park, with Camelops in the right background

Tracks found in Alberta, Canada suggest that like living camels, Camelops probably lived in herds, which like living camels may have been led by a dominant adult male. Isotopic analysis suggests that Camelops may have engaged in seasonal migrations. As in living camels, Camelops may have had a slow reproductive rate, including giving birth to a single offspring at a time, as well as existing at relatively low population densities due to its large size. Camelops hesternus was probably predated upon by large carnivores, which during the Late Pleistocene may have included dire wolves (Aenocyon dirus) the sabertooth cat Smilodon fatalis, the scimitar-toothed cat (Homotherium serum) and the American lion (Panthera atrox). Specimens of Camelops have been found exhibiting signs of disease like osteoarthritis.

== Relationship with humans and extinction ==
Camelops went extinct around 13-12,000 years ago as part of the end-Pleistocene extinction event along with most other large mammals across the Americas. These extinctions followed the arrival of humans to the Americas, and it is suggested that human hunting may have had a contributory role in the extinctions (though some authors have argued that climatic change was the most important factor). At Wally's Beach in Alberta, Canada, butchered remains of Camelops hesternus displaying cut and fracture marks, alongside those of caballine true horses are associated with stone tools, with the site radiocarbon dated to around 13,300 years ago. This represents the only confirmed Camelops butchery site. The site was originally attributed to the Clovis culture based on the similar timing as well as findings of unassociated Clovis points within the local area, but the site does not display clear evidence of Clovis-type tools. Some authors have suggested that fractured bones of Camelops found near Casper, Wyoming (which also represent the youngest well-dated remains of the species, dating to around 13,060 years Before Present) may represent a butchery site, but this is not definitive. Other possible, but not definitive sites where Camelops remains may be associated with human activity include Carter/Kerr-McGee and Colby sites in Wyoming (the latter of which is associated with a Clovis point) and the Lehner site in Arizona. A sacrum of Camelops found near Tequixquiac in central Mexico has been suggested to have been shaped to resemble an animal head.

== See also ==
- Aepycamelus
- Eulamaops
- Oxydactylus
- Poebrotherium
- Procamelus
- Protylopus
- Stenomylus
- Syrian camel, an extinct species that reached at least 9 feet (2.7 m) tall at the shoulder
- Pleistocene megafauna
- Snowmastodon Project
