= Camelus thomasi =

Camelus thomasi Temporal range: 1.2–0.5 Ma

Scientific classification
- Kingdom: Animalia
- Phylum: Chordata
- Class: Mammalia
- Order: Artiodactyla
- Family: Camelidae
- Genus: Camelus
- Species: †C. thomasi

Binomial name
- †Camelus thomasi (Pomel, 1893)

Extinct species of camel

Camelus thomasi (also known as Thomas' Camel) is an extinct species of camel from the Early-Mid Pleistocene of North Africa. It is known primarily from Tighennif (Ternifine) in Algeria. Fossils from northern Sudan, Israel and Palestine dated to the Late Pleistocene have been included under C. thomasi, but they are now considered to belong to different species, making C. thomasi a strictly Northwest African species.

== Description ==
Camelus thomasi was larger than any living species of camel. Other defining characteristics include pachyostosis especially marked in the mandible, broad molars with strong styles, and several unique cranial features. Some studies have linked it as a possible ancestor to the dromedary, while others suggest it may be more closely related to the Bactrian camel of central Asia. However, a 2018 study revealed such assertions to be lacking any scientific basis, and C. thomasi appears to not be closely related to any living camel.
