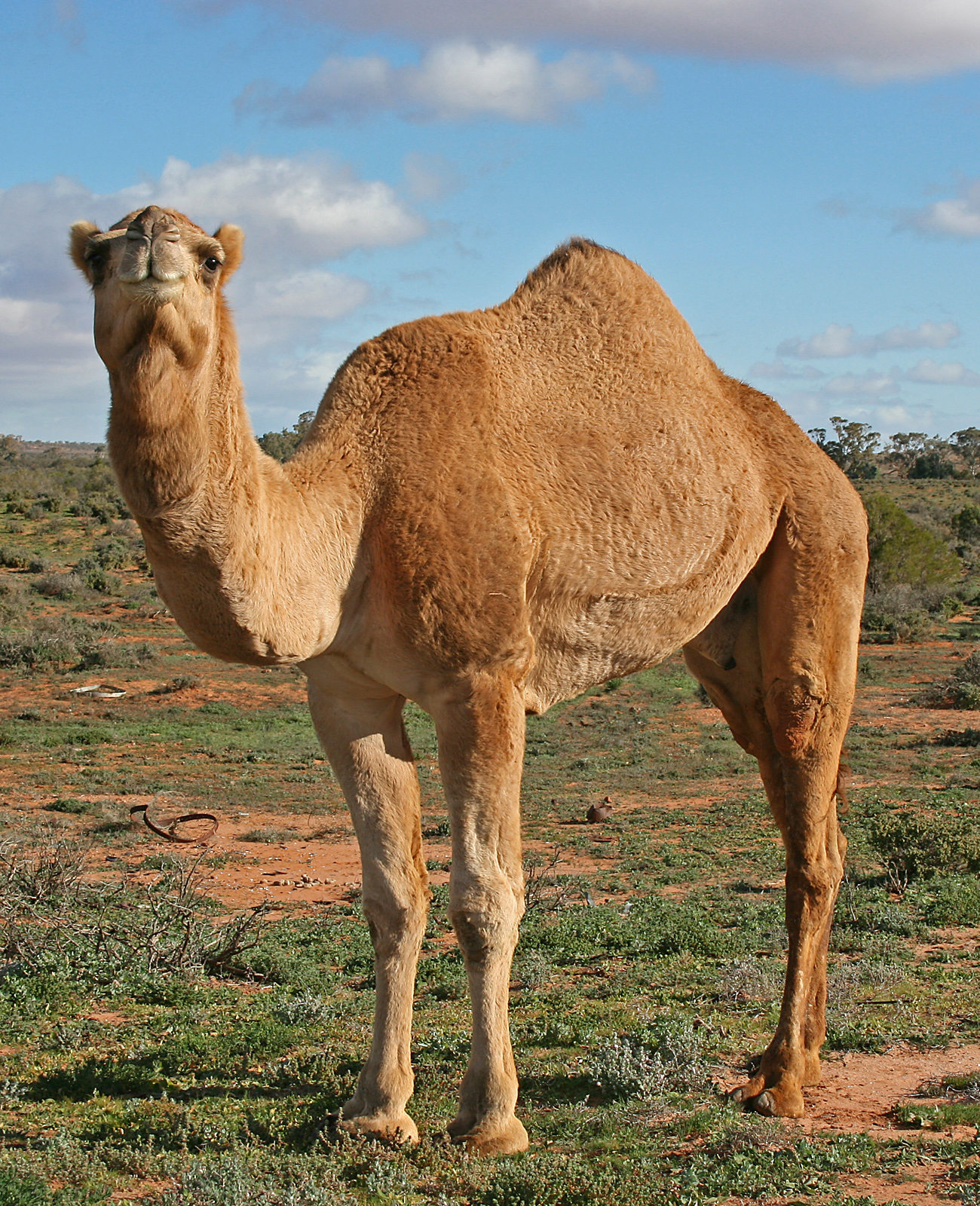
- Dromedary (Camelus dromedarius), the most widespread species of camel

Scientific classification
- Kingdom: Animalia
- Phylum: Chordata
- Class: Mammalia
- Order: Artiodactyla
- Family: Camelidae
- Tribe: Camelini
- Genus: Camelus; Linnaeus, 1758

Type species
- Camelus dromedarius Linnaeus, 1758

Species
- C. bactrianus; C. dromedarius; C. ferus; †C. grattardi; †C. knoblochi; †C. moreli; †C. sivalensis; †C. thomasi
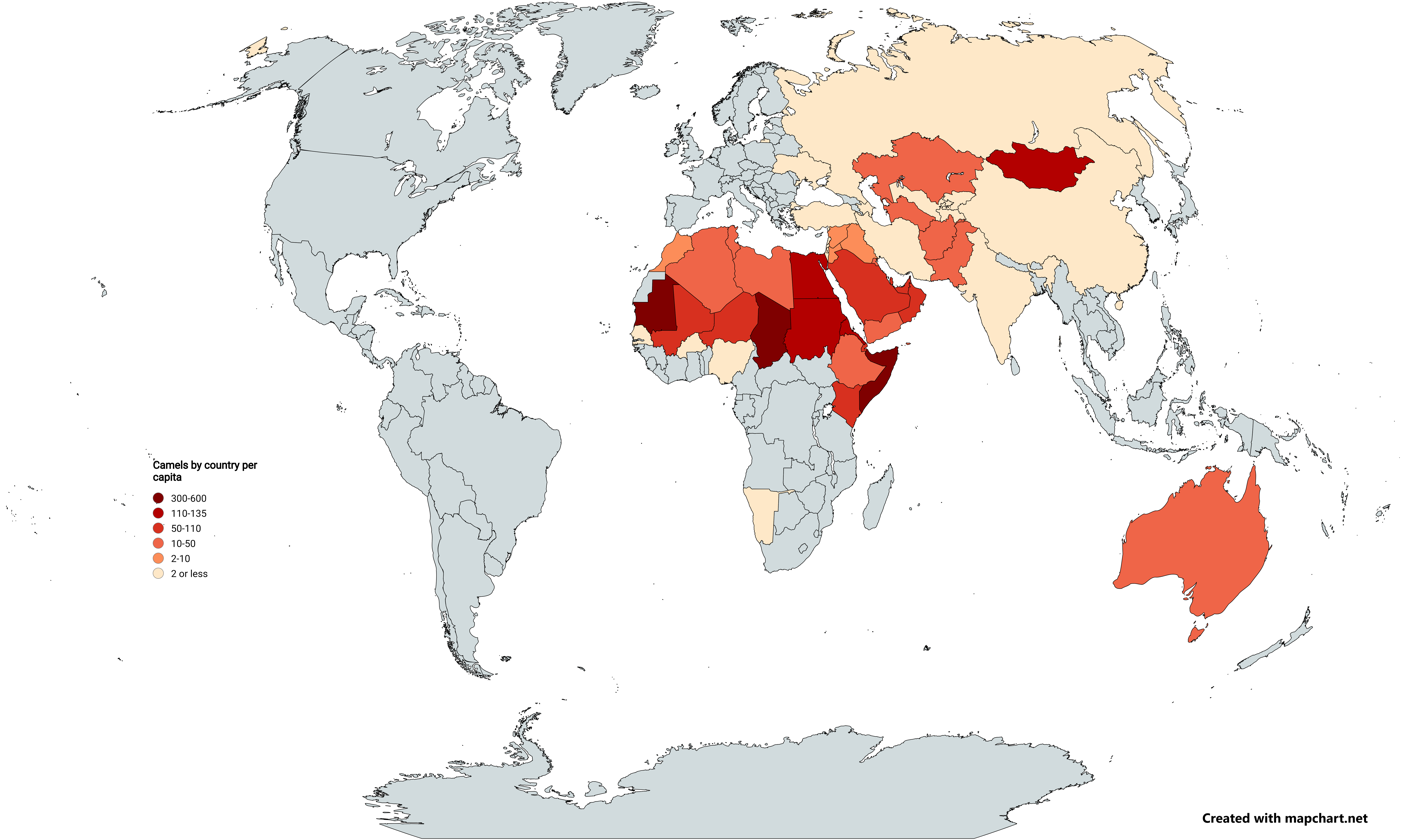
- Distribution of camels worldwide

Synonyms
- Camellus Molina, 1782; Dromedarius Gloger, 1841

= Camel =

Camel Temporal range: Pliocene–Recent

Genus of mammals

A camel (from Latin: camelus and Ancient Greek: κάμηλος (kamēlos) from Ancient Semitic: gāmāl) is an even-toed ungulate in the genus Camelus that bears distinctive fatty deposits known as "humps" on its back. Camels have long been domesticated and, as livestock, they provide food (camel milk and meat) and textiles (fiber and felt from camel hair). Camels are working animals especially suited to their desert habitat and are a vital means of transport for passengers and cargo. There are three surviving species of camel. The one-humped dromedary makes up 94% of the world's camel population, and the two-humped Bactrian camel makes up 6%. The wild Bactrian camel is a distinct species that is not ancestral to the domestic Bactrian camel, and is now endangered, with around 1,000 individuals and a continuing decline.

The word camel is also used informally in a wider sense, where the more correct term is "camelid", to include all seven species of the family Camelidae: the true camels (the above three species), along with the "New World" camelids: the llama, the alpaca, the guanaco, and the vicuña, which belong to the separate tribe Lamini. Camelids originated in North America during the Eocene, with the ancestor of modern camels, Paracamelus, migrating across the Bering land bridge into Asia during the late Miocene, around 6 million years ago.

== Taxonomy ==
Of the 8 species placed in the genus Camelus, only three are extant. Fossils have been discovered of the five extinct species. The cladogram is as follows:

- Camelidae
  - Lamini (llamas)
  - Camelini
    - †Camelops
    - Camelus
      - Camelus dromedarius (Dromedary)
      - - †Camelus knoblochi
        - Camelus ferus (Wild Bactrian)
        - Camelus bactrianus (Bactrian)

=== Extinct species ===
The extinct species of Camelus discovered so far are:

- †C. grattardi
- †C. knoblochi
- †C. moreli
- †C. sivalensis
- †C. thomasi

=== Extant species ===
Three species are extant:

Camelus Linnaeus, 1758
Image	Common Name	Scientific name	Distribution	IUCN status Population trend
	Bactrian camel	Camelus bactrianus (Linnaeus, 1758)		Not assessed
	Dromedary	Camelus dromedarius (Linnaeus, 1758)		Not assessed
	Wild Bactrian camel	Camelus ferus (Przewalski, 1878)		EN ▼

== Biology ==
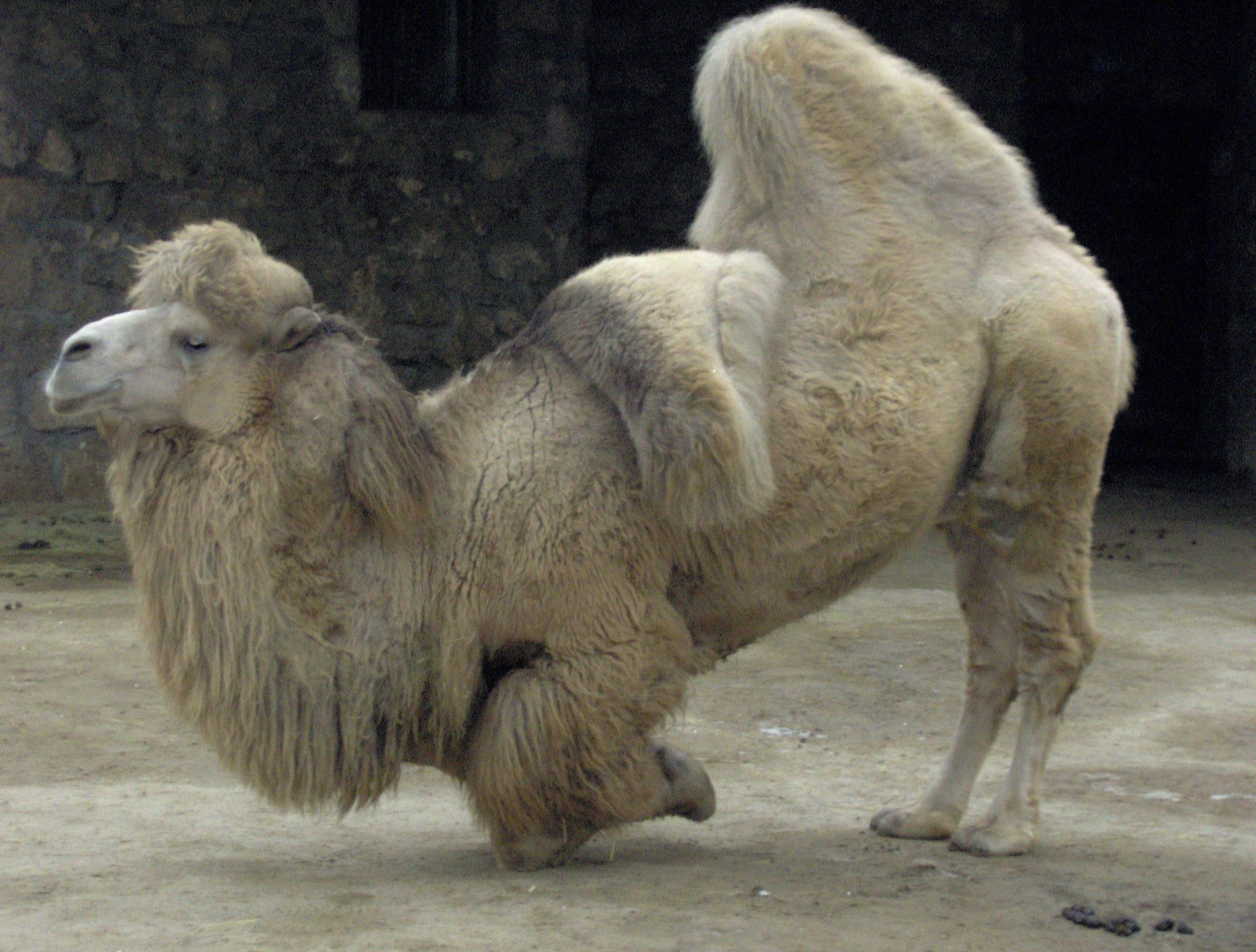
Camel humps store fat for when food is scarce. If a camel uses the fat, the hump becomes limp and droops

The average life expectancy of a camel is 40 to 50 years. A full-grown adult dromedary camel stands 1.85 m (6 ft 1 in) at the shoulder and 2.15 m (7 ft 1 in) at the hump. Bactrian camels can be a foot taller. Camels can run at up to 65 km/h (40 mph) in short bursts and sustain speeds of up to 40 km/h (25 mph). Bactrian camels weigh 300 to 1,000 kg (660 to 2,200 lb) and dromedaries 300 to 600 kg (660 to 1,320 lb). The widening toes on a camel's hoof provide supplemental grip for varying soil sediments.

The male dromedary camel has an organ called a dulla in his throat, a large, inflatable sac that he extrudes from his mouth when in rut to assert dominance and attract females. It resembles a long, swollen, pink tongue hanging out of the side of the camel's mouth. Camels mate by having both male and female sitting on the ground, with the male mounting from behind. The male usually ejaculates three or four times within a single mating session. Camelids are the only ungulates to mate in a sitting position.

=== Ecological and behavioral adaptations ===
It is a common myth that a camel stores water in its hump, but the humps in fact are reservoirs of fatty tissue, which can be used as a reserve source of calories, not water. When this tissue is metabolized, it yields a greater mass of water than that of the fat processed. This is because fat metabolization converts oxygen into water as part of producing energy. However, the act of breathing in this oxygen also causes water to evaporate from the lungs. Overall, in dry climates, this leads to a net decrease in water.

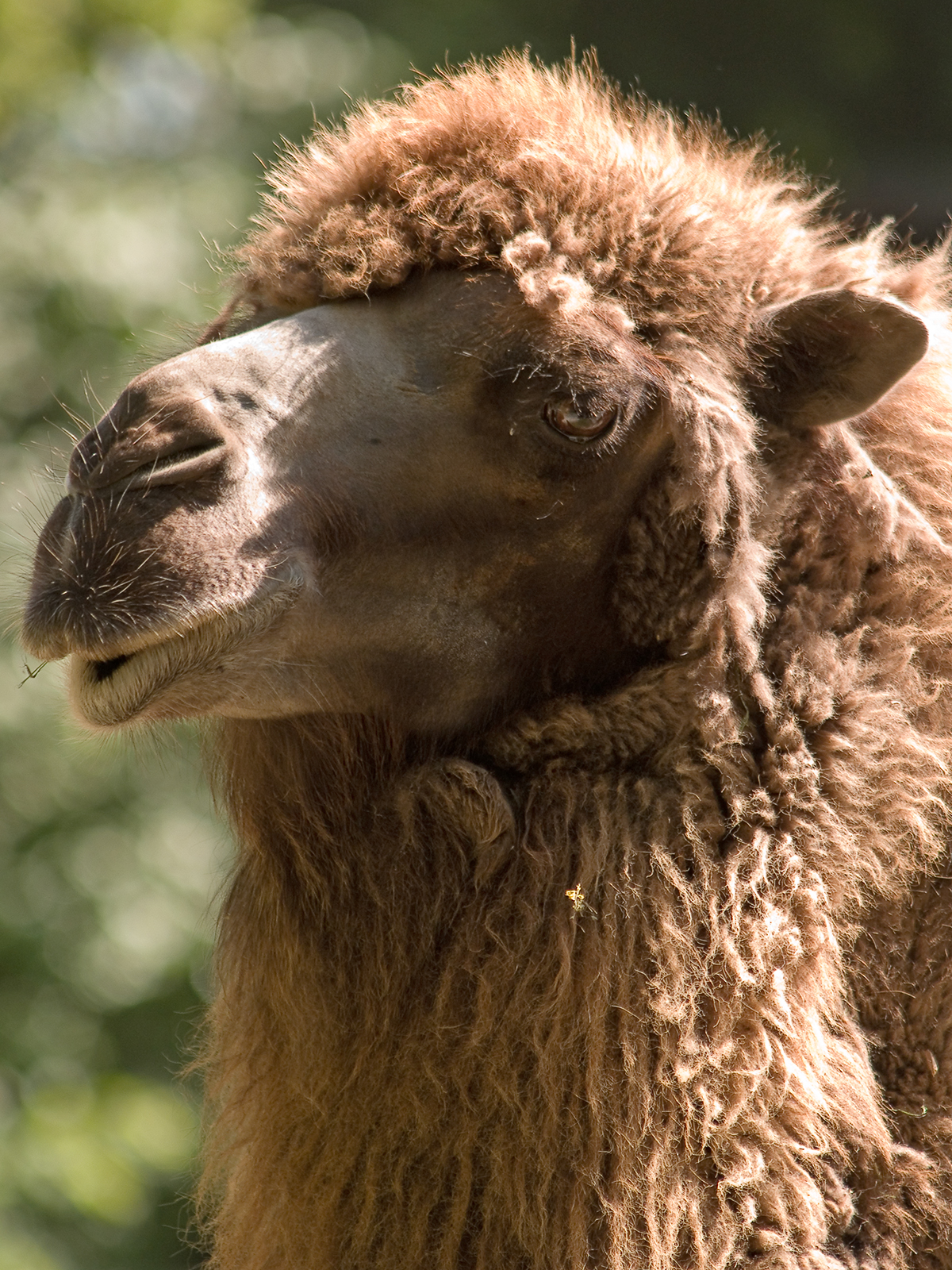
A camel's thick coat is one of its many adaptations that aid it in desert-like conditions

Camels have a series of physiological adaptations that allow them to withstand long periods of time without any external source of water. The dromedary camel can drink as seldom as once every 10 days even under very hot conditions, and can lose up to 30% of its body mass due to dehydration. They can drink as much as 30 imperial gallons (140 litres) at a time but this is stored in the animal's bloodstream, not, as popularly believed, in its humps.

Unlike other mammals, camels' red blood cells are oval rather than circular in shape. This facilitates the flow of red blood cells during dehydration and makes them better at withstanding high osmotic variation without rupturing when drinking large amounts of water.

Camels are able to withstand changes in body temperature and water consumption that would kill most other mammals. Their temperature ranges from 34 °C (93 °F) at dawn and steadily increases to 40 °C (104 °F) by sunset, before they cool off at night again. In general, to compare between camels and the other livestock, camels lose only 1.3 liters of fluid intake every day while the other livestock lose 20 to 40 liters per day. Maintaining the brain temperature within certain limits is critical for animals; to assist this, camels have a rete mirabile, a complex of arteries and veins lying very close to each other which utilizes countercurrent blood flow to cool blood flowing to the brain. Camels rarely sweat, even when ambient temperatures reach 49 °C (120 °F). Any sweat that does occur evaporates at the skin level rather than at the surface of their coat; the heat of vaporization therefore comes from body heat rather than ambient heat. Camels can withstand losing 25% of their body weight in water, whereas most other mammals can withstand only about 12–14% dehydration before cardiac failure results from circulatory disturbance.

When the camel exhales, water vapor becomes trapped in their nostrils and is reabsorbed into the body as a means to conserve water. Camels eating green herbage can ingest sufficient moisture in milder conditions to maintain their bodies' hydrated state without the need for drinking.

Camels have three-chambered stomachs and perform rumination as part of their digestive process, even though they are not part of the ruminant sub-order.

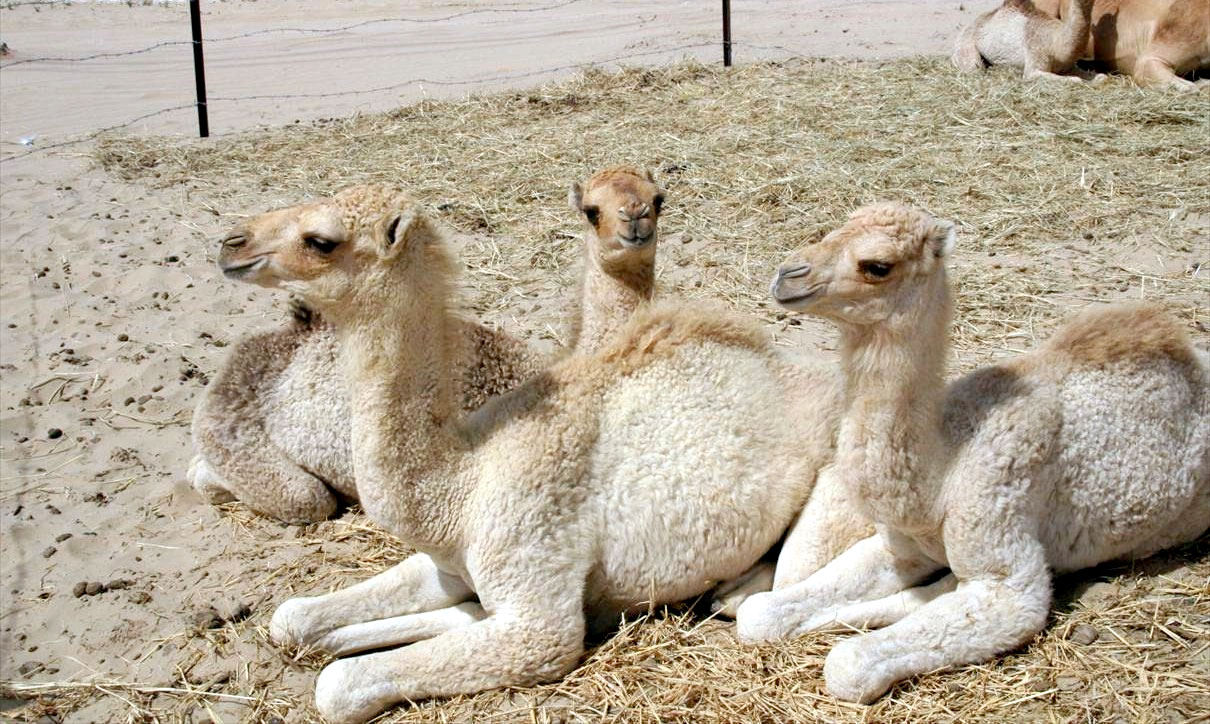
Domesticated camel calves lying in sternal recumbency, which aids heat loss

A unique bone, the os diaphragmaticum, is present in the camel diaphragm to prevent it from tearing during inhalation.

The camel's thick coat insulates it from the intense heat radiated from desert sand; a shorn camel must sweat 50% more to avoid overheating. During the summer the coat becomes lighter in color, reflecting light as well as helping avoid sunburn. The camel's long legs help by keeping its body farther from the ground, which can heat up to 70 °C (158 °F). Dromedaries have a pad of thick tissue over the sternum called the pedestal. When the animal lies down in a sternal recumbent position, the pedestal raises the body from the hot surface and allows cooling air to pass under the body.

Camels' mouths have a thick leathery lining, allowing them to chew thorny desert plants. Long eyelashes and ear hairs, together with nostrils that can close, form a barrier against sand. If sand gets lodged in their eyes, they can dislodge it using their translucent third eyelid (also known as the nictitating membrane). The camels' gait and widened feet help them move without sinking into the sand.

The kidneys and intestines of a camel are very efficient at reabsorbing water. Camels' kidneys have a 1:4 cortex to medulla ratio. Thus, the medullary part of a camel's kidney occupies twice as much area as a cow's kidney. Secondly, renal corpuscles have a smaller diameter, which reduces surface area for filtration. These two major anatomical characteristics enable camels to conserve water and limit the volume of urine in extreme desert conditions. Camel urine comes out as a thick syrup, and camel faeces are so dry that they do not require drying when used to fuel fires.

The camel immune system differs from those of other mammals. Normally, the Y-shaped antibody molecules consist of two heavy (or long) chains along the length of the Y, and two light (or short) chains at each tip of the Y. Camels, in addition to these, also have antibodies made of only two heavy chains, a trait that makes them smaller and more durable. These "heavy-chain-only" antibodies, discovered in 1993, are thought to have developed 50 million years ago, after camelids split from ruminants and pigs.

The parasite Trypanosoma evansi causes the disease surra in camels.

=== Genetics ===
The karyotypes of different camelid species have been studied earlier by many groups, but no agreement on chromosome nomenclature of camelids has been reached. A 2007 study flow sorted camel chromosomes, building on the fact that camels have 37 pairs of chromosomes (2n=74), and found that the karyotype consisted of one metacentric, three submetacentric, and 32 acrocentric autosomes. The Y is a small metacentric chromosome, while the X is a large metacentric chromosome.

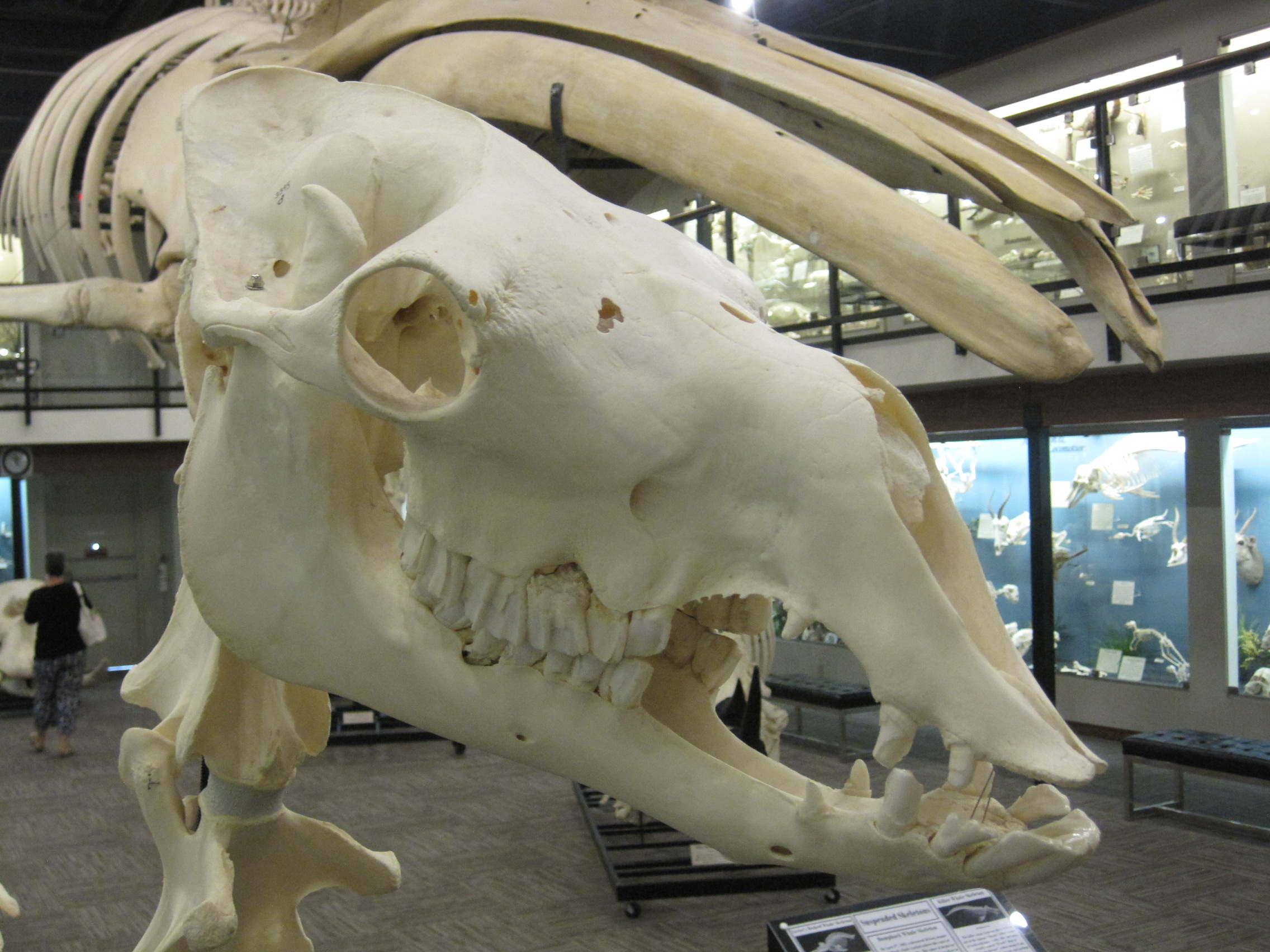
Skull of an F1 hybrid camel, Museum of Osteology, Oklahoma

The hybrid camel, a hybrid between Bactrian and dromedary camels, has one hump, though it has an indentation 4–12 cm (1.6–4.7 in) deep that divides the front from the back. The hybrid is 2.15 m (7 ft 1 in) at the shoulder and 2.32 m (7 ft 7 in) tall at the hump. It weighs an average of 650 kg (1,430 lb) and can carry around 400 to 450 kg (880 to 990 lb), which is more than either the dromedary or Bactrian can.

According to molecular data, the wild Bactrian camel (C. ferus) separated from the domestic Bactrian camel (C. bactrianus) about 1 million years ago. New World and Old World camelids diverged about 11 million years ago. In spite of this, these species can hybridize and produce viable offspring. The cama is a camel-llama hybrid bred by scientists to see how closely related the parent species are. Scientists collected semen from a camel via an artificial vagina and inseminated a llama after stimulating ovulation with gonadotrophin injections. The cama is halfway in size between a camel and a llama and lacks a hump. It has ears intermediate between those of camels and llamas, longer legs than the llama, and partially cloven hooves. Like the mule, camas are sterile, despite both parents having the same number of chromosomes.

=== Evolution ===
The earliest known camel, called Protylopus, lived in North America 40 to 50 million years ago (during the Eocene). It was about the size of a rabbit and lived in the open woodlands of what is now South Dakota. By 35 million years ago, the Poebrotherium was the size of a goat and had many more traits similar to camels and llamas. The hoofed Stenomylus, which walked on the tips of its toes, also existed around this time, and the long-necked Aepycamelus evolved in the Miocene. The split between the tribes Camelini, which contains modern camels and Lamini, modern llamas, alpacas, vicuñas, and guanacos, is estimated to have occurred over 16 million years ago.

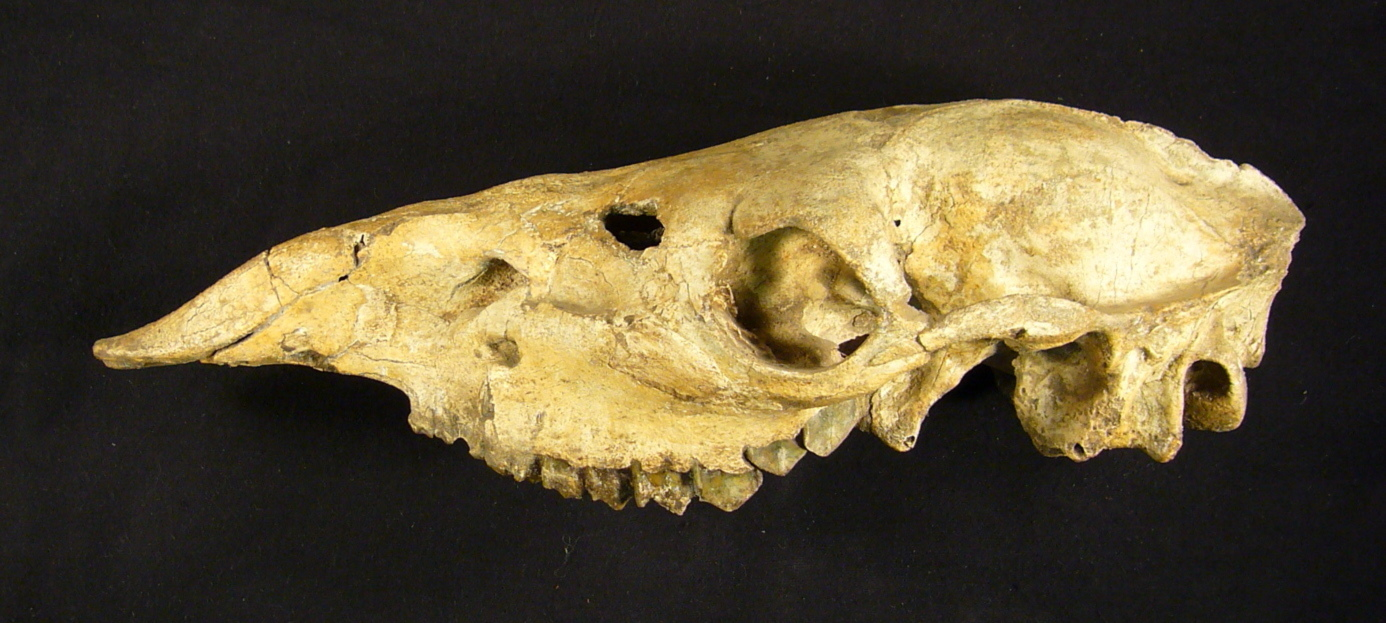
Procamelus skull

The ancestor of modern camels, Paracamelus, migrated into Eurasia from North America via Beringia during the late Miocene, between 7.5 and 6.5 million years ago. During the Pleistocene, around 3 to 1 million years ago, the North American Camelidae spread to South America as part of the Great American Interchange via the newly formed Isthmus of Panama, where they gave rise to guanacos and related animals. Populations of Paracamelus continued to exist in the North American Arctic into the Early Pleistocene. This creature is estimated to have stood around nine feet (2.7 metres) tall. The Bactrian camel diverged from the dromedary about 1 million years ago, according to the fossil record.

The last camel native to North America was Camelops hesternus, which vanished along with horses, short-faced bears, mammoths and mastodons, ground sloths, sabertooth cats, and many other megafauna as part of the Quaternary extinction event, coinciding with the migration of humans from Asia at the end of the Pleistocene, around 13–11,000 years ago.

An extinct giant camel species, Camelus knoblochi, roamed Asia during the Late Pleistocene, before becoming extinct around 20,000 years ago.

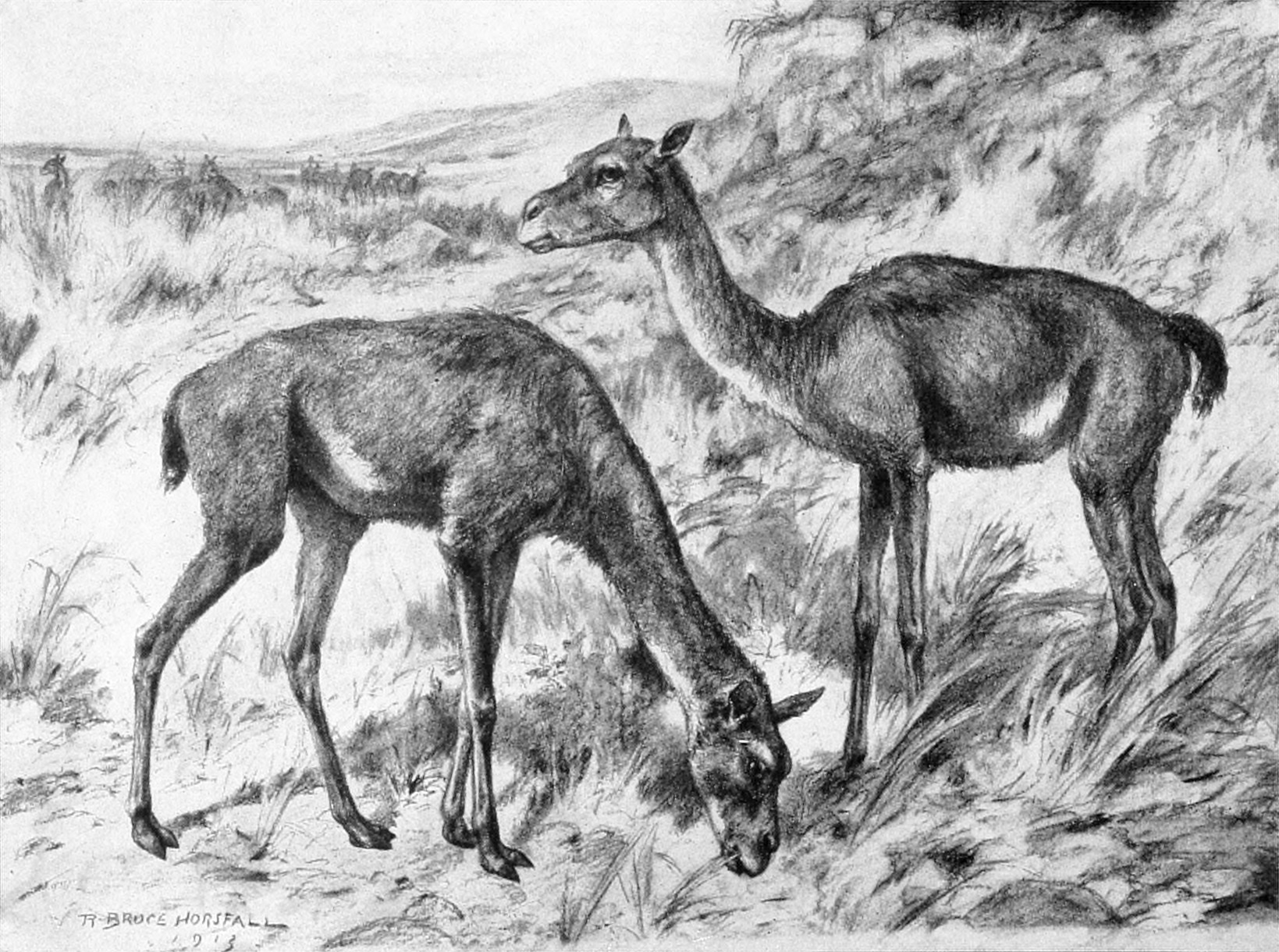
Stenomylus illustration

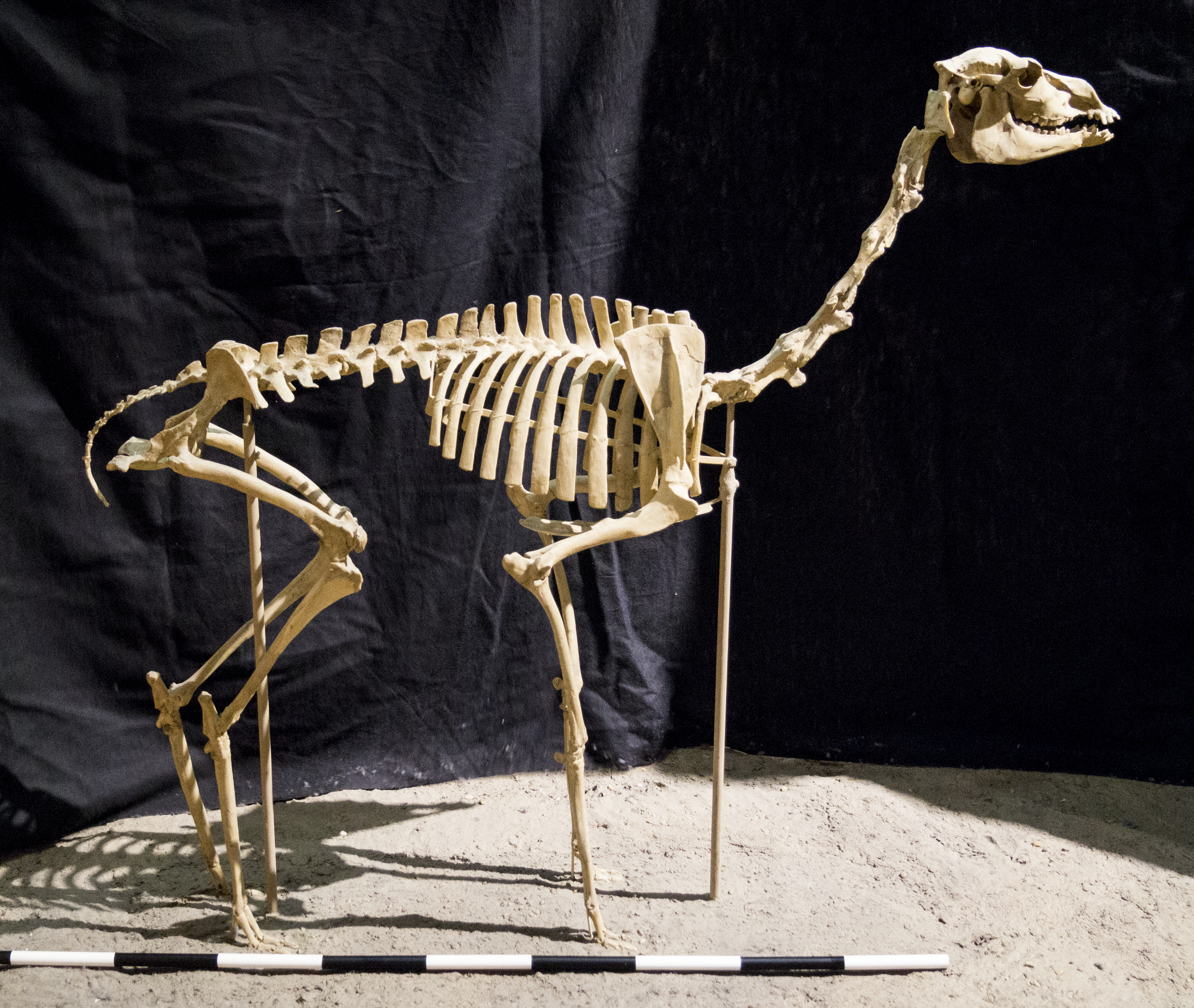
Stenomylus skeleton

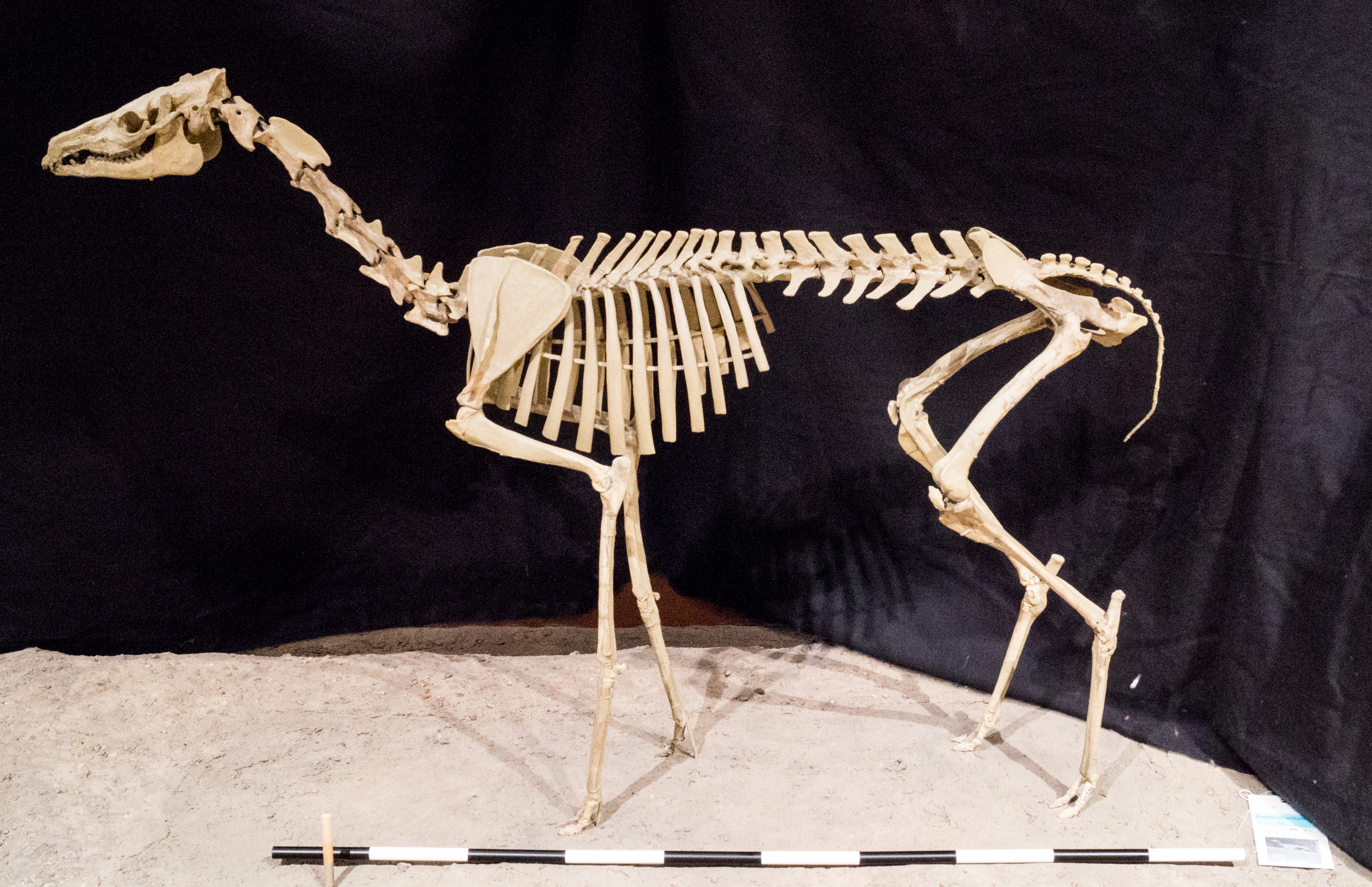
Poebrotherium skeleton

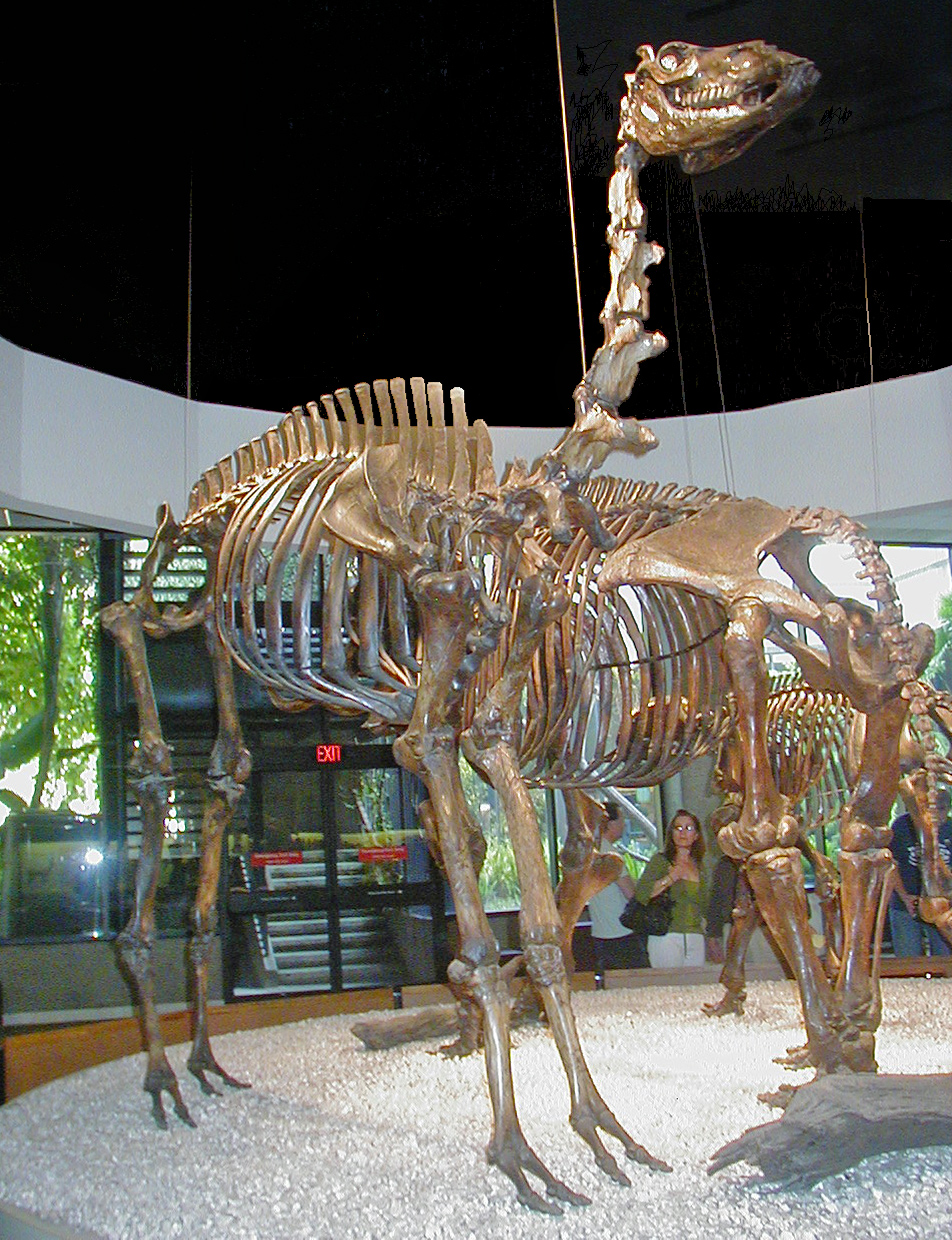
Camelops hesternus skeleton

== Domestication ==
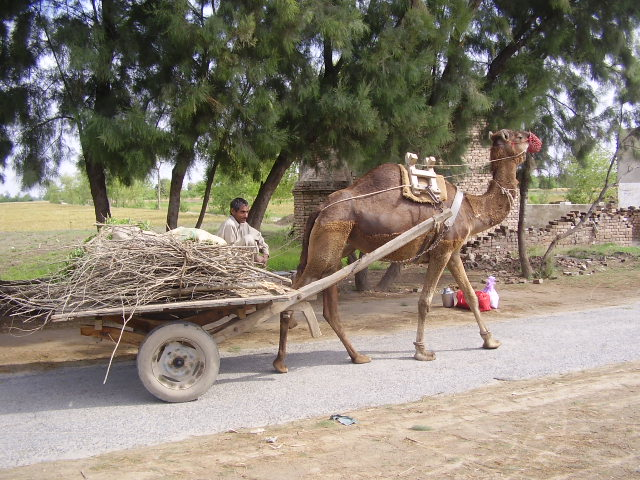
A camel serving as a draft animal in Pakistan

Like horses, camels originated in North America and eventually spread across Beringia to Asia. They survived in the Old World, and eventually humans domesticated them and spread them globally. Along with many other megafauna in North America, the original wild camels were wiped out during the spread of the first indigenous peoples of the Americas from Asia into North America, 10 to 12,000 years ago; although fossils have never been associated with definitive evidence of hunting.

Most camels surviving today are domesticated. Although feral populations exist in Australia, India and Kazakhstan, wild camels survive only in the wild Bactrian camel population of the Gobi Desert.

=== History ===
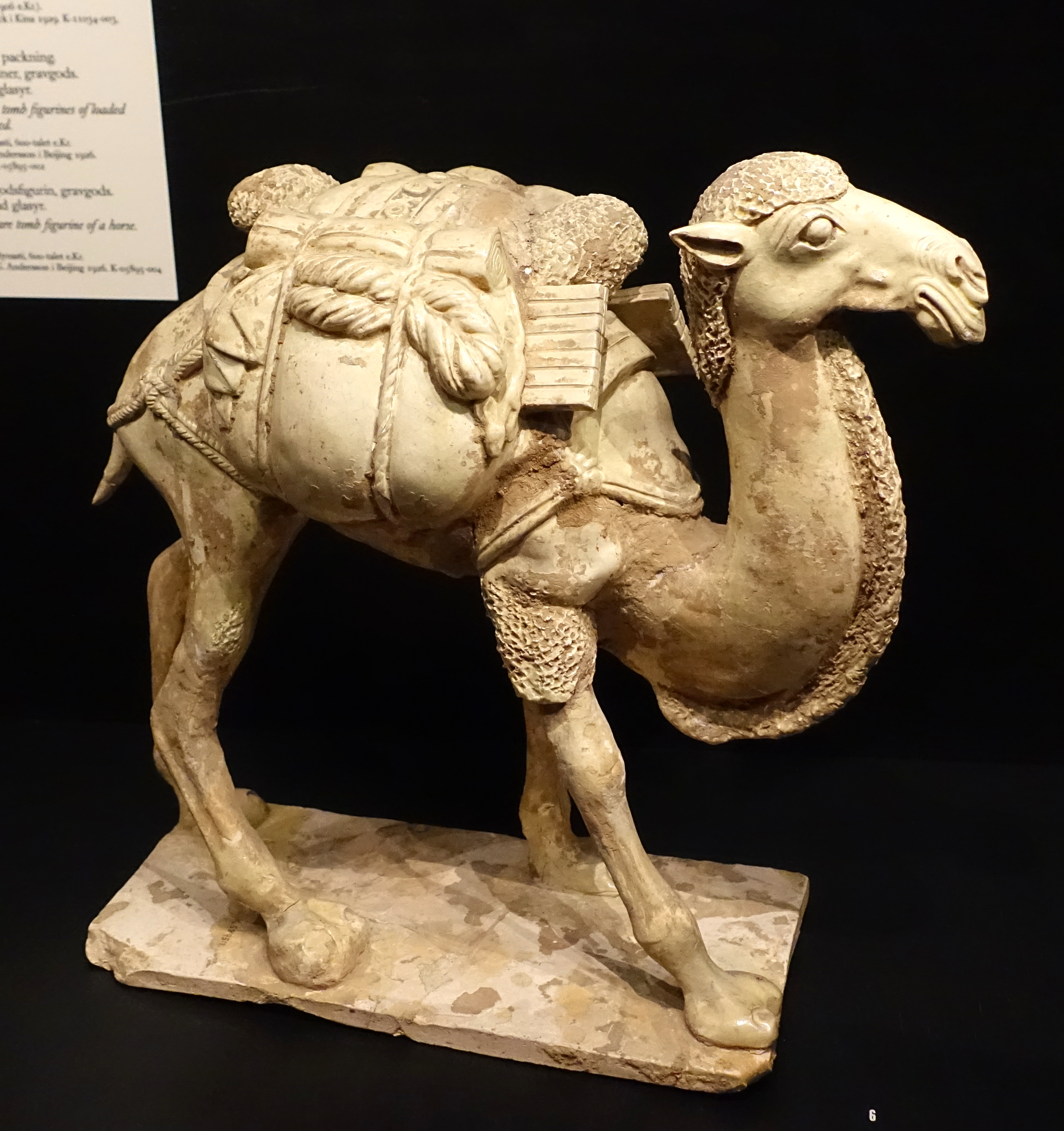
Figurine of a camel carrying supplies, Tang dynasty

When humans first domesticated camels is disputed. Dromedaries may have first been domesticated by humans in Somalia or South Arabia sometime during the 3rd millennium BC, the Bactrian in central Asia around 2,500 BC, as at Shahr-e Sukhteh (also known as the Burnt City), Iran. A study from 2016, which genotyped and used world-wide sequencing of modern and ancient mitochondrial DNA (mtDNA), suggested that they were initially domesticated in the southeast Arabian Peninsula, with the Bactrian type later being domesticated around Central Asia.

Martin Heide's 2010 work on the domestication of the camel tentatively concludes that humans had domesticated the Bactrian camel by at least the middle of the third millennium somewhere east of the Zagros Mountains, with the practice then moving into Mesopotamia. Heide suggests that mentions of camels "in the patriarchal narratives may refer, at least in some places, to the Bactrian camel", while noting that the camel is not mentioned in relationship to Canaan. Heide and Joris Peters reasserted that conclusion in their 2021 study on the subject.

In 2009–2013, excavations in the Timna Valley by Lidar Sapir-Hen and Erez Ben-Yosef discovered what may be the earliest domestic camel bones yet found in Israel or even outside the Arabian Peninsula, dating to around 930 BC. This garnered considerable media coverage, as it is strong evidence that the stories of Abraham, Jacob, Esau, and Joseph were written after this time.

The existence of camels in Mesopotamia and Arabia but not in Syria is not a new idea. The historian Richard Bulliet thought that although camels were occasionally mentioned in the Bible, this didn't mean that the domestic camels were common in the Holy Land at that time. The archaeologist William F. Albright, writing even earlier, saw camels in the Bible as an anachronism.

The official report by Sapir-Hen and Ben-Joseph says:

The introduction of the dromedary camel (Camelus dromedarius) as a pack animal to the southern Levant ... substantially facilitated trade across the vast deserts of Arabia, promoting both economic and social change (e.g., Kohler 1984; Borowski 1998: 112–116; Jasmin 2005). This ... has generated extensive discussion regarding the date of the earliest domestic camel in the southern Levant (and beyond) (e.g., Albright 1949: 207; Epstein 1971: 558–584; Bulliet 1975; Zarins 1989; Köhler-Rollefson 1993; Uerpmann and Uerpmann 2002; Jasmin 2005; 2006; Heide 2010; Rosen and Saidel 2010; Grigson 2012). Most scholars today agree that the dromedary was exploited as a pack animal sometime in the early Iron Age (not before the 12th century [BC])

and concludes:

Current data from copper smelting sites of the Arabah Valley enable us to pinpoint the introduction of domestic camels to the southern Levant more precisely based on stratigraphic contexts associated with an extensive suite of radiocarbon dates. The data indicate that this event occurred not earlier than the last third of the 10th century [BC] and most probably during this time. The coincidence of this event with a major reorganization of the copper industry of the region—attributed to the results of the campaign of Pharaoh Shoshenq I—raises the possibility that the two were connected, and that camels were introduced as part of the efforts to improve efficiency by facilitating trade.

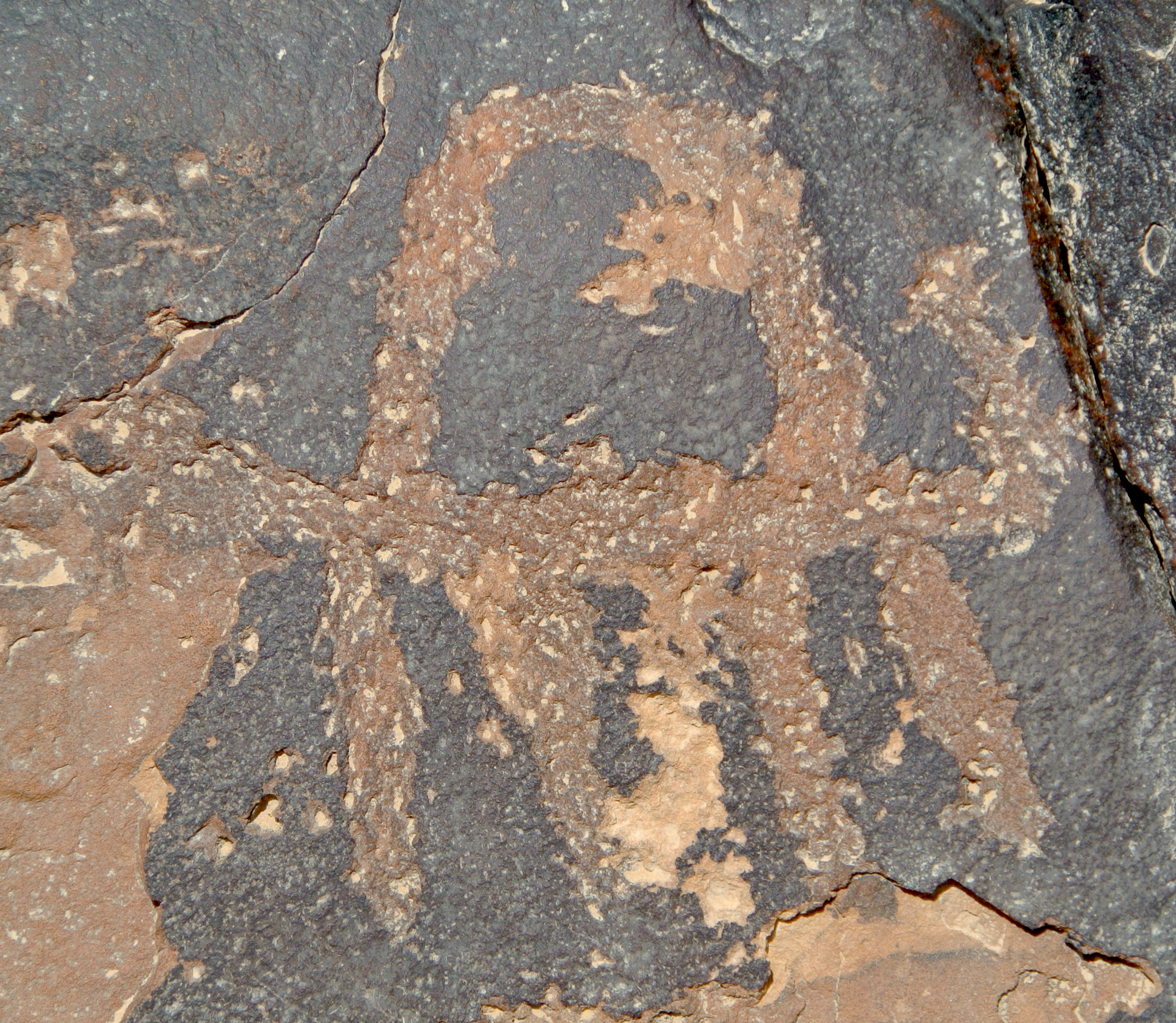
Petroglyph of a camel, Negev, southern Israel (prior to c. 5300 BC)

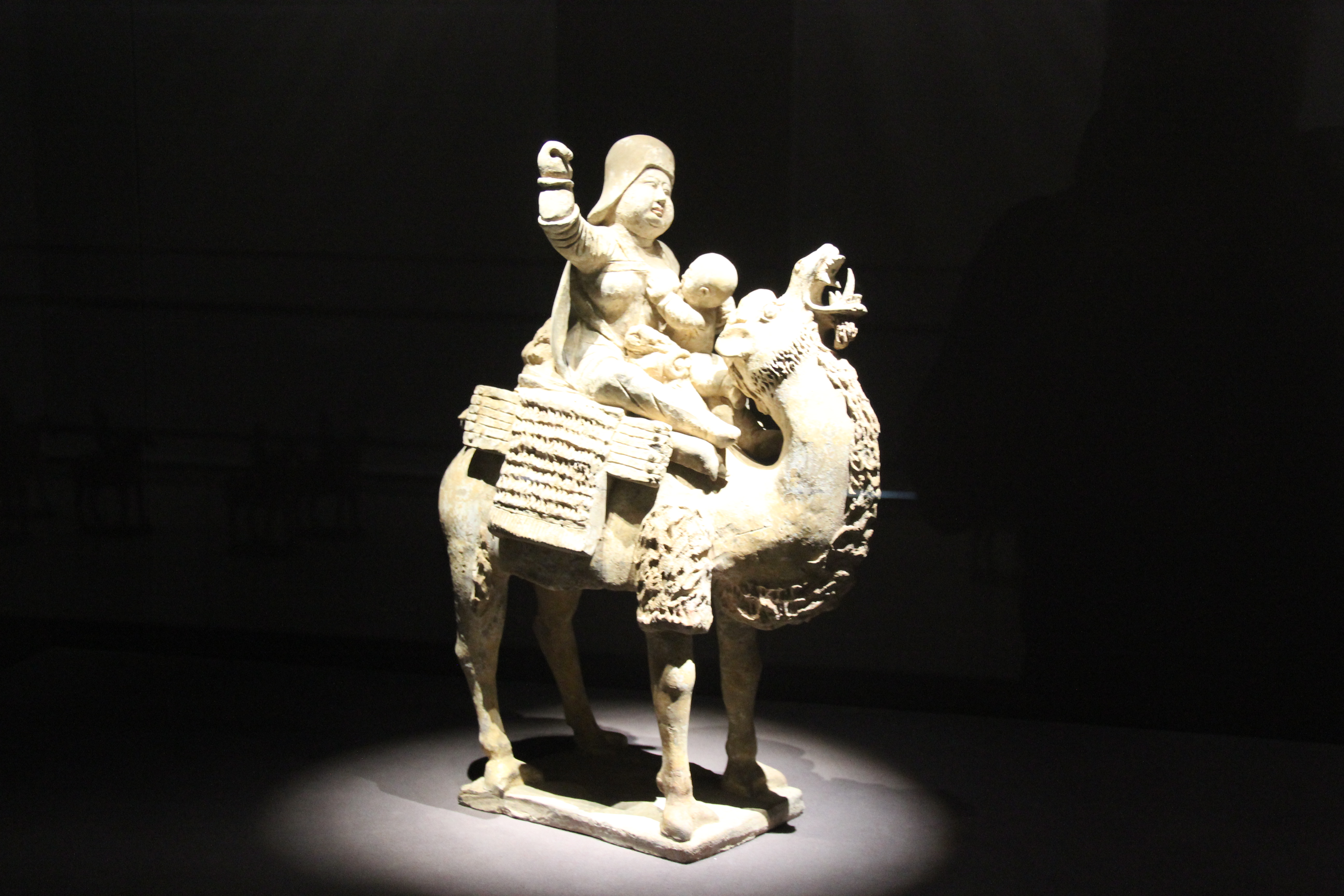
Figurine of a nursing mother on a camel, Tang dynasty (c. 713 – 766)

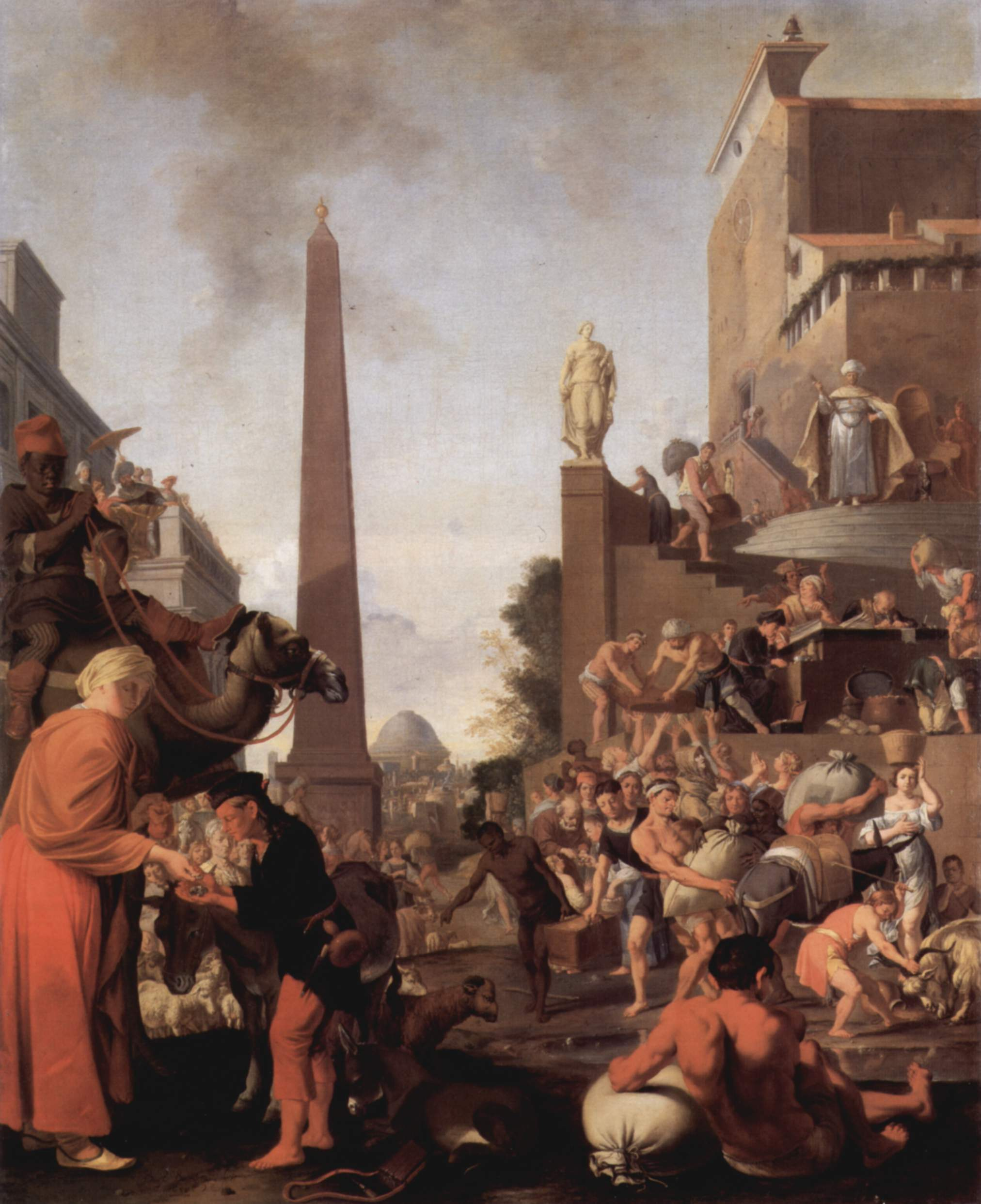
Joseph Sells Grain by Bartholomeus Breenbergh (1655), showing camel with rider at left

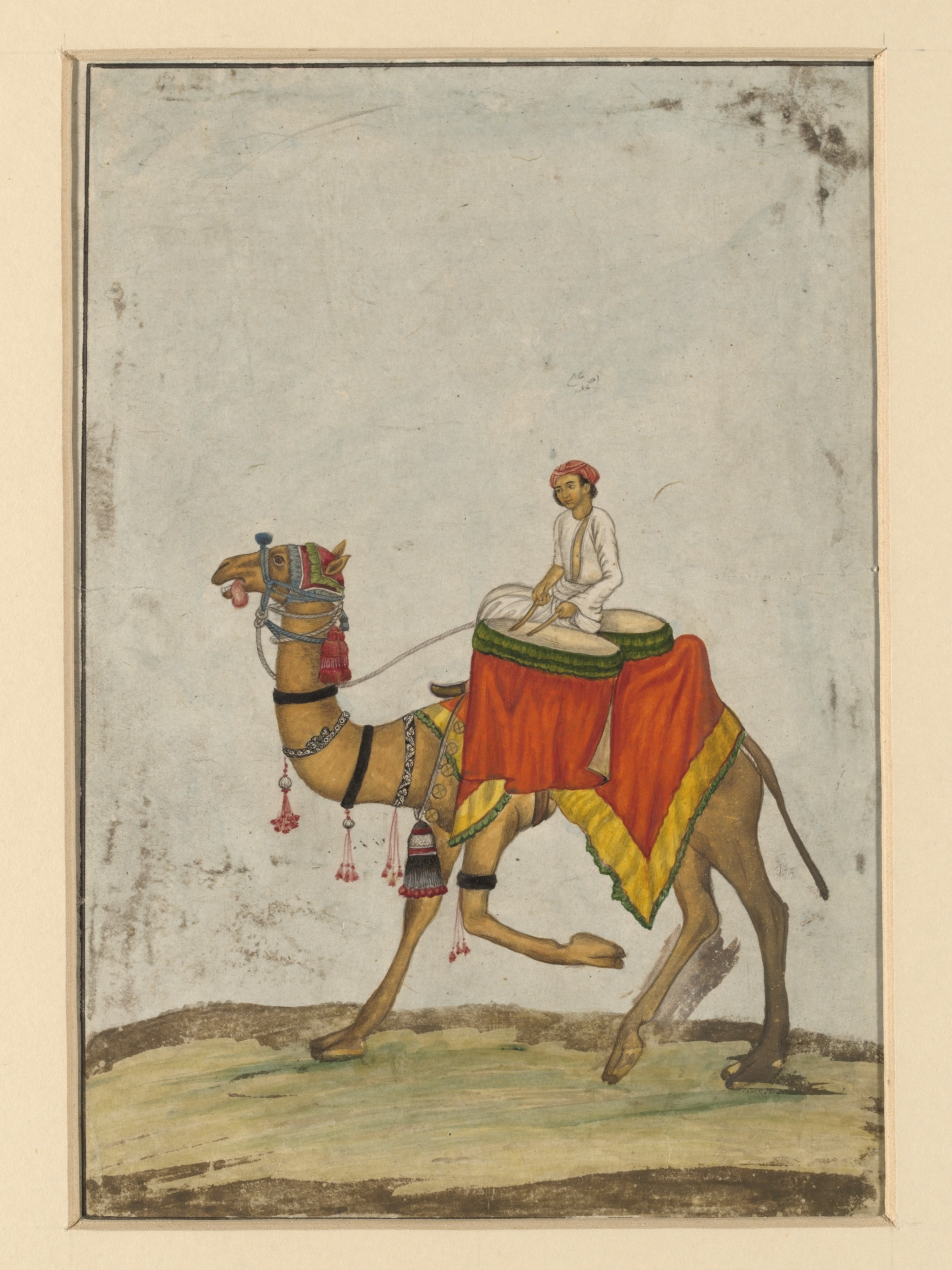
A camel in a ceremonial procession, its rider playing kettledrums, Mughal Empire (c. 1840)

=== Textiles ===
Desert tribes and Mongolian nomads use camel hair for tents, yurts, clothing, bedding and accessories. Camels have outer guard hairs and soft inner down, and the fibers may also be sorted by color and age of the animal. The guard hairs can be felted for use as waterproof coats for the herdsmen, while the softer hair is used for premium goods. The fiber can be spun for use in weaving or made into yarns for hand knitting or crochet. Pure camel hair is recorded as being used for western garments from the 17th century onwards, and from the 19th century a mixture of wool and camel hair was used.

=== Military uses ===
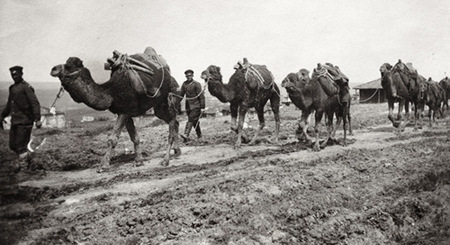
A camel caravan of the Bulgarian military during the First Balkan War, (1912)

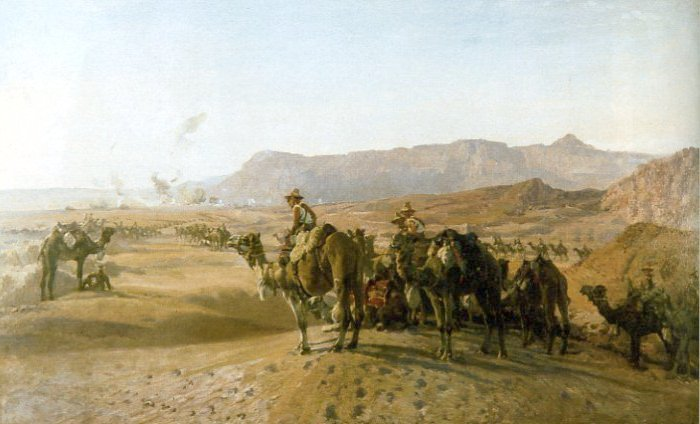
Camel Corps at Magdhaba, Egypt, 23 December 1916, by Harold Septimus Power (1925)

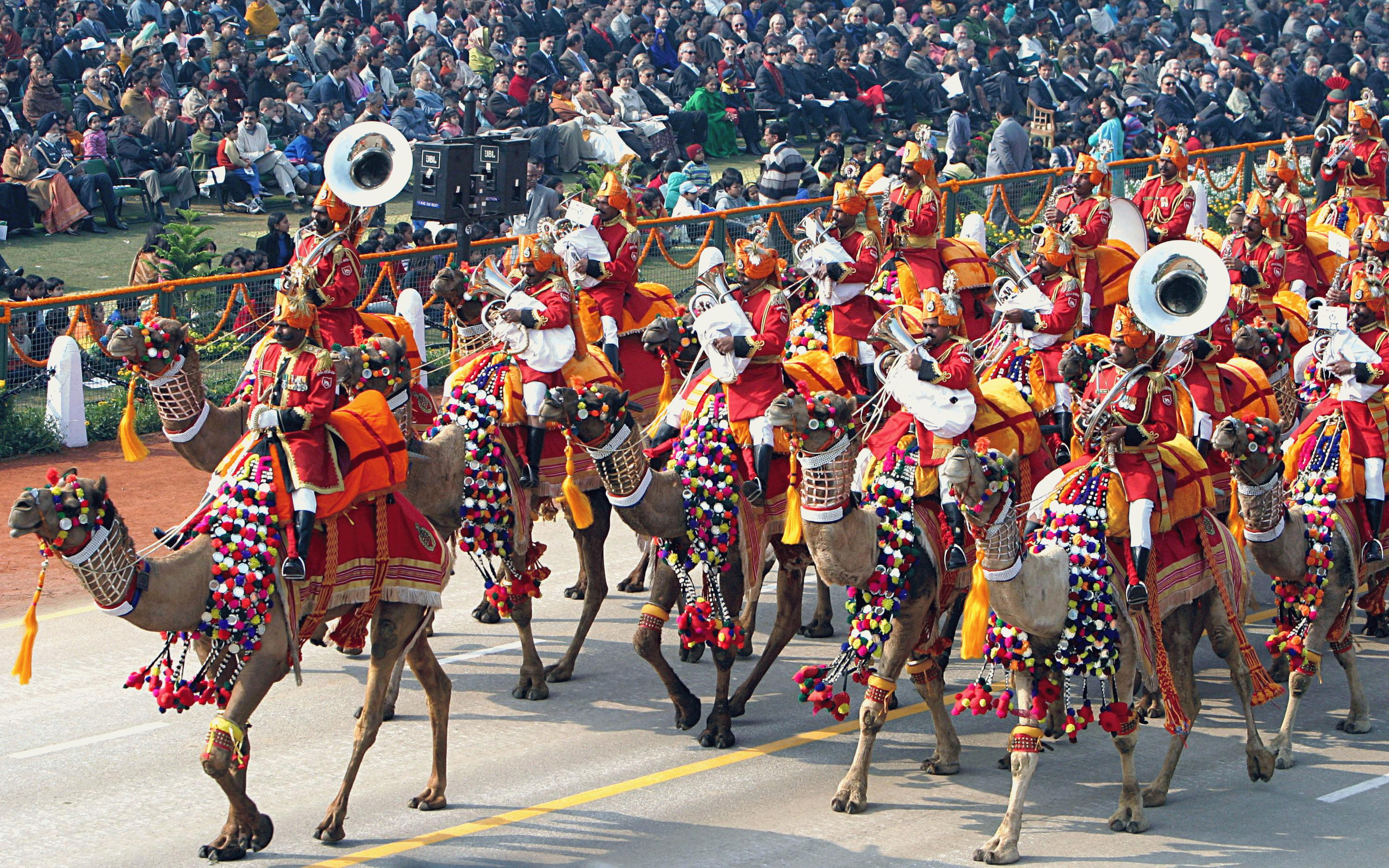
A special BSF camel contingent, Republic Day Parade, New Delhi (2004)

By at least 1200 BC the first camel saddles had appeared, and Bactrian camels could be ridden. The first saddle was positioned to the back of the camel, and control of the Bactrian camel was exercised by means of a stick. However, between 500 and 100 BC, Bactrian camels came into military use. New saddles, which were inflexible and bent, were put over the humps and divided the rider's weight over the animal. In the seventh century BC the military Arabian saddle evolved, which again improved the saddle design slightly.

Military forces have used camel cavalries in wars throughout Africa, the Middle East, and their use continues into the modern-day within the Border Security Force (BSF) of India. The first documented use of camel cavalries occurred in the Battle of Qarqar in 853 BC. Armies have also used camels as freight animals instead of horses and mules.

The East Roman Empire used auxiliary forces known as dromedarii, whom the Romans recruited in desert provinces. The camels were used mostly in combat because of their ability to scare off horses at close range (horses are afraid of the camels' scent), a quality famously employed by the Achaemenid Persians when fighting Lydia in the Battle of Thymbra (547 BC).

==== 19th and 20th centuries ====
The United States Army established the U.S. Camel Corps, stationed in California, in the 19th century. One may still see stables at the Benicia Arsenal in Benicia, California, where they nowadays serve as the Benicia Historical Museum. Though the experimental use of camels was seen as a success (John B. Floyd, Secretary of War in 1858, recommended that funds be allocated towards obtaining a thousand more camels), the outbreak of the American Civil War in 1861 saw the end of the Camel Corps: Texas became part of the Confederacy, and most of the camels were left to wander away into the desert.

France created a méhariste camel corps in 1912 as part of the Armée d'Afrique in the Sahara in order to exercise greater control over the camel-riding Tuareg and Arab insurgents, as previous efforts to defeat them on foot had failed. The Free French Camel Corps fought during World War II, and camel-mounted units remained in service until the end of French rule over Algeria in 1962.

In 1916, the British created the Imperial Camel Corps. It was originally used to fight the Senussi, but was later used in the Sinai and Palestine Campaign in World War I. The Imperial Camel Corps comprised infantrymen mounted on camels for movement across desert, though they dismounted at battle sites and fought on foot. After July 1918, the Corps began to become run down, receiving no new reinforcements, and was formally disbanded in 1919. In World War I, the British Army also created the Egyptian Camel Transport Corps, which consisted of a group of Egyptian camel drivers and their camels. The Corps supported British war operations in Sinai, Palestine, and Syria by transporting supplies to the troops. The Somaliland Camel Corps was created by colonial authorities in British Somaliland in 1912; it was disbanded in 1944. The Bikaner Camel Corps of British India fought alongside the British Indian Army in World Wars I and II.

Bactrian camels were used by Romanian forces during World War II in the Caucasian region. At the same period the Soviet units operating around Astrakhan in 1942 adopted local camels as draft animals due to shortage of trucks and horses, and kept them even after moving out of the area. Despite severe losses, some of these camels ended up as far west as to Berlin itself.

The Tropas Nómadas (Nomad Troops) were an auxiliary regiment of Sahrawi tribesmen serving in the colonial army in Spanish Sahara (today Western Sahara). Operational from the 1930s until the end of the Spanish presence in the territory in 1975, the Tropas Nómadas were equipped with small arms and led by Spanish officers. The unit guarded outposts and sometimes conducted patrols on camelback.

==== 21st century ====
The annual King Abdulaziz Camel Festival is held in Saudi Arabia. In addition to camel racing and camel milk tasting, the festival holds a camel "beauty pageant" with prize money of $57m (£40m). In 2018, 12 camels were disqualified from the beauty contest after their owners were found to have injected them with botox. In a similar incident in 2021, over 40 camels were disqualified.

=== Food uses ===
Camel meat and milk are foods that are found in many cuisines, typically in West Asian, North African and some Australian cuisines. Camels provide food in the form of meat and milk.

==== Dairy ====
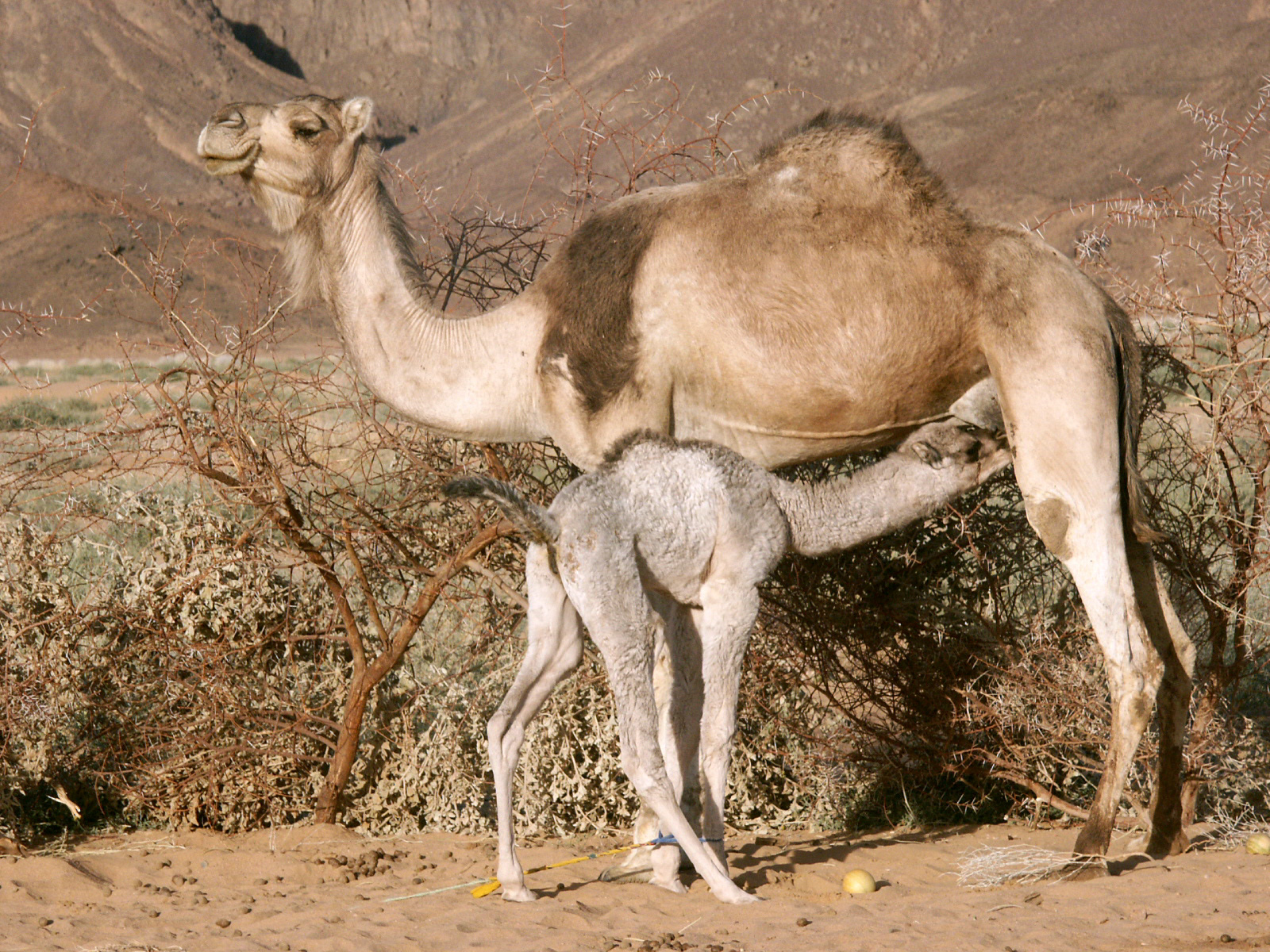
A camel calf nursing on camel milk

Camel milk is a staple food of desert nomad tribes and is sometimes considered a meal itself; a nomad can live on only camel milk for almost a month.

Camel milk can readily be made into yogurt, but can only be made into butter if it is soured first, churned, and a clarifying agent is then added. Until recently, camel milk could not be made into camel cheese because rennet was unable to coagulate the milk proteins to allow the collection of curds. Developing less wasteful uses of the milk, the FAO commissioned Professor J.P. Ramet of the École Nationale Supérieure d'Agronomie et des Industries Alimentaires, who was able to produce curdling by the addition of calcium phosphate and vegetable rennet in the 1990s. The cheese produced from this process has low levels of cholesterol and is easy to digest, even for the lactose intolerant. Camel milk can also be made into ice cream, and has also been used to make milk chocolate.

==== Meat ====
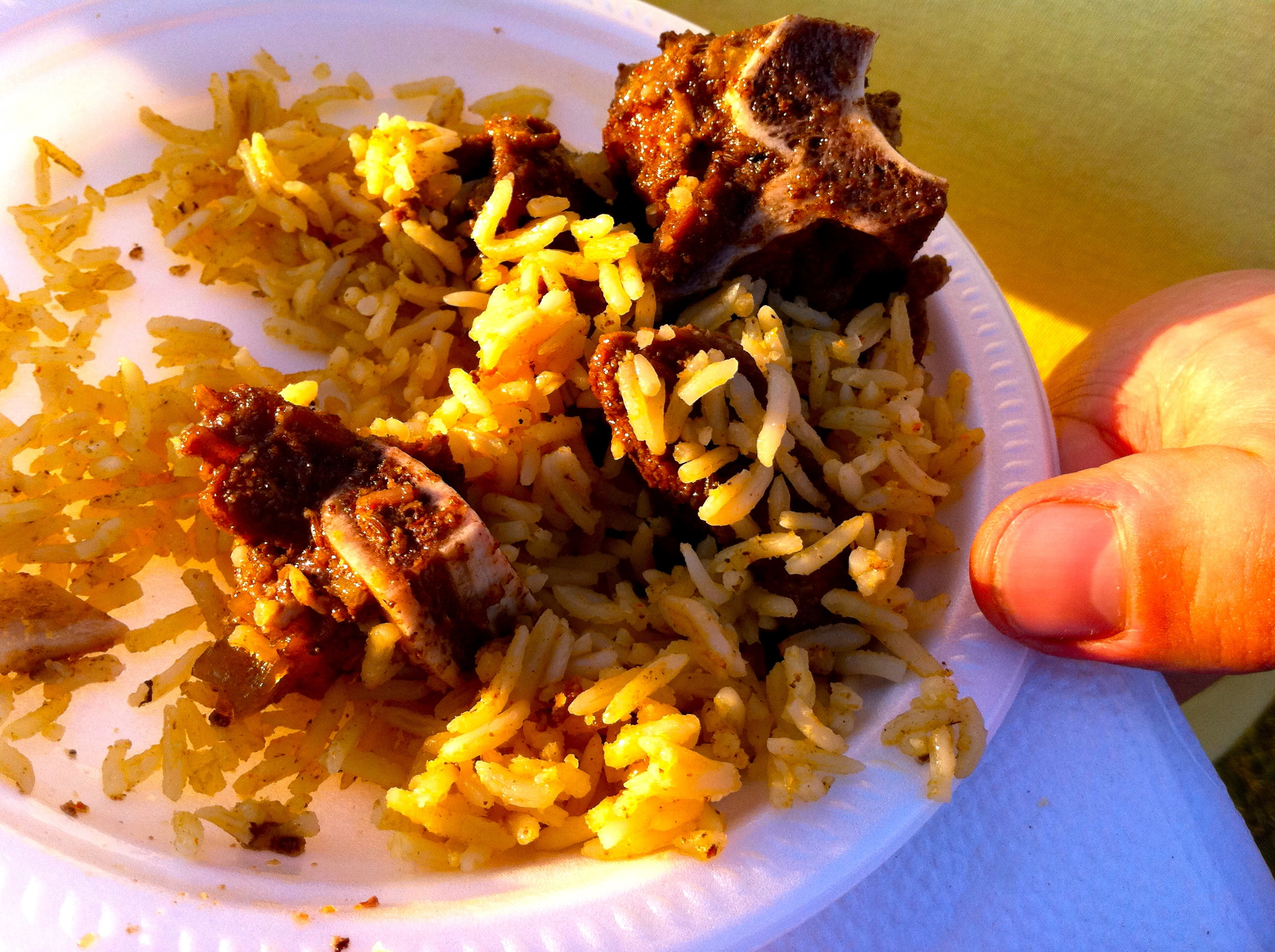
A Somali camel meat and rice dish

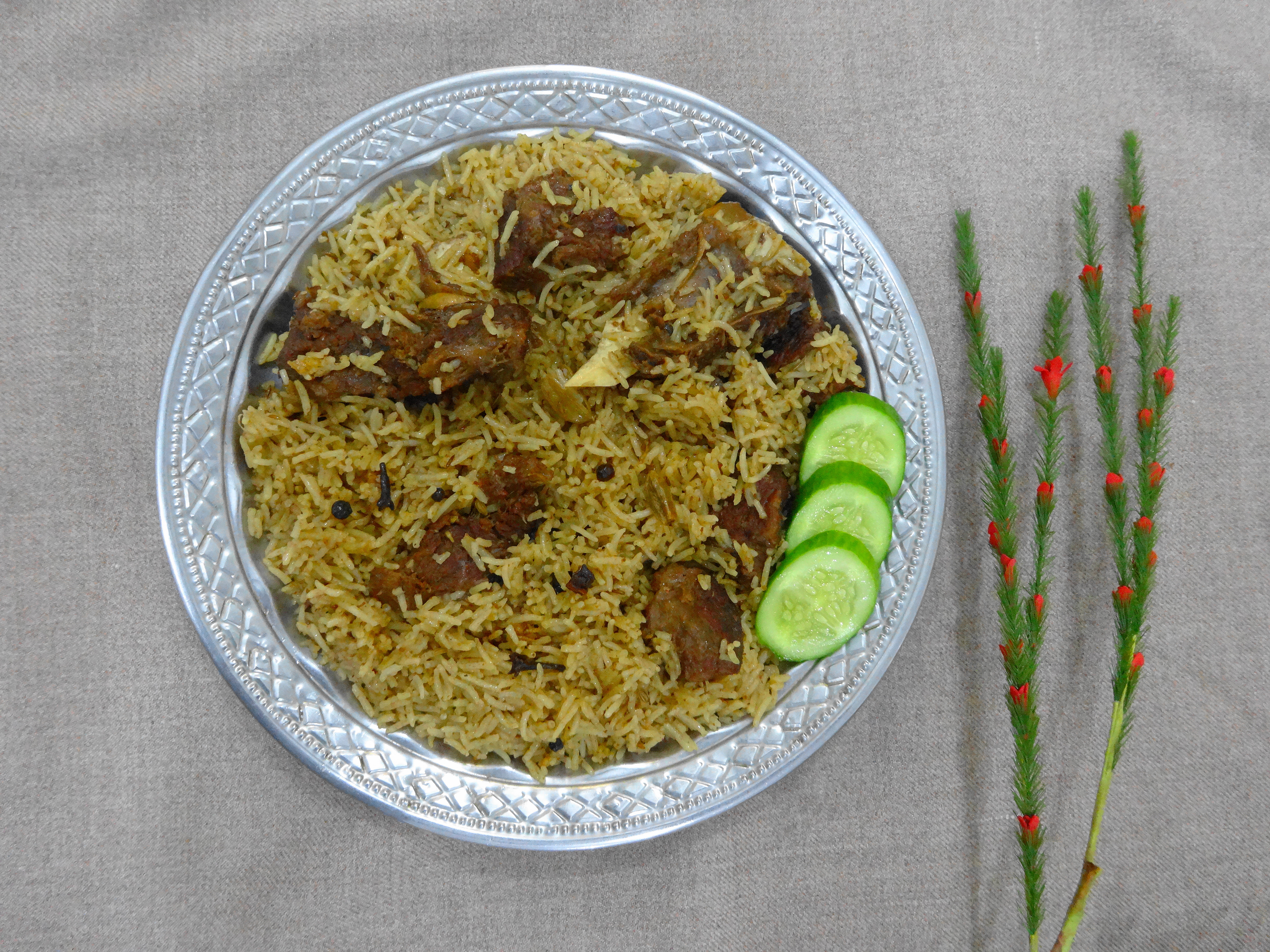
Camel meat pulao, from Pakistan

Approximately 3.3 million camels and camelids are slaughtered each year for meat worldwide. A camel carcass can provide a substantial amount of meat. The male dromedary carcass can weigh 300–400 kg (661–882 lb), while the carcass of a male Bactrian can weigh up to 650 kg (1,433 lb). The carcass of a female dromedary weighs less than the male, ranging between 250 and 350 kg (550 and 770 lb). The brisket, ribs and loin are among the preferred parts, and the hump is considered a delicacy. The hump contains "white and sickly fat", which can be used to make the khli (preserved meat) of mutton, beef, or camel. On the other hand, camel milk and meat are rich in protein, vitamins, glycogen, and other nutrients making them essential in the diet of many people. From chemical composition to meat quality, the dromedary camel is the preferred breed for meat production. It does well even in arid areas due to its unusual physiological behaviors and characteristics, which include tolerance to extreme temperatures, radiation from the sun, water paucity, rugged landscape and low vegetation. Camel meat is reported to taste like coarse beef, but older camels can prove to be very tough, although camel meat becomes tenderer the more it is cooked.

Camel is one of the animals that can be ritually slaughtered and divided into three portions (one for the home, one for extended family/social networks, and one for those who cannot afford to slaughter an animal themselves) for the qurban of Eid al-Adha. The Abu Dhabi Officers' Club serves a camel burger mixed with beef or lamb fat in order to improve the texture and taste. In Karachi, Pakistan, some restaurants prepare nihari from camel meat. Specialist camel butchers provide expert cuts, with the hump considered the most popular.

Camel meat has been eaten for centuries. It has been recorded by ancient Greek writers as an available dish at banquets in ancient Persia, usually roasted whole. The Roman emperor Heliogabalus enjoyed camel's heel. Camel meat is mainly eaten in certain regions, including Eritrea, Somalia, Djibouti, Saudi Arabia, Egypt, Syria, Libya, Sudan, Ethiopia, Kazakhstan, and other arid regions where alternative forms of protein may be limited or where camel meat has had a long cultural history. Camel blood is also consumable, as is the case among pastoralists in northern Kenya, where camel blood is drunk with milk and acts as a key source of iron, vitamin D, salts and minerals. A 2005 report issued jointly by the Saudi Ministry of Health and the United States Centers for Disease Control and Prevention details four cases of human bubonic plague resulting from the ingestion of raw camel liver.

Camel meat is also occasionally found in Australian cuisine: for example, a camel lasagna is available in Alice Springs. Australia has exported camel meat, primarily to the Middle East but also to Europe and the US, for many years. The meat is very popular among East African Australians, such as Somalis, and other Australians have also been buying it. The feral nature of the animals means they produce a different type of meat to farmed camels in other parts of the world, and it is sought after because it is disease-free, and a unique genetic group. Demand is outstripping supply, and governments are being urged not to cull the camels, but redirect the cost of the cull into developing the market. Australia has seven camel dairies, which produce milk, cheese and skincare products in addition to meat.

Production of camel meat per animal

Camel meat production

=== Religion ===
==== Islam ====
Muslims consider camel meat halal (Arabic: حلال, 'allowed'). However, according to some Islamic schools of thought, a state of impurity is brought on by the consumption of it. Consequently, these schools hold that Muslims must perform wudhu (ablution) before the next time they pray after eating camel meat. Also, some Islamic schools of thought consider it haram (Arabic: حرام, 'forbidden') for a Muslim to perform Salat in places where camels lie, as it is said to be a dwelling place of the Shaytan (Arabic: شيطان, 'Devil'). According to Abu Yusuf (d.798), the urine of camels may be used for medical treatment if necessary, but according to Abū Ḥanīfah, the drinking of camel urine is discouraged.

Islamic texts contain several stories featuring camels. In the story of the people of Thamud, the prophet Salih miraculously brings forth a naqat (Arabic: ناقة, 'milch-camel') out of a rock. After Muhammad migrated from Mecca to Medina (the Hijrah), he allowed his she-camel to roam there; the location where the camel stopped to rest determined the location where he would build his house in Medina.

==== Judaism ====
According to Jewish tradition, camel meat and milk are not kosher. Camels possess only one of the two kosher criteria; although they chew their cud, they do not have cloven hooves: "But these you shall not eat among those that bring up the cud and those that have a cloven hoof: the camel, because it brings up its cud, but does not have a [completely] cloven hoof; it is unclean for you."

The Palestinian Muslim Makhamara clan in Yatta, who claim descent from Jews, reportedly avoid eating camel meat, a practice cited as evidence of their Jewish origins.

=== Cultural depictions ===
What may be the oldest carvings of camels were discovered in 2018 in Saudi Arabia. They were analysed by researchers from several scientific disciplines and, in 2021, were estimated to be 7,000 to 8,000 years old. The dating of rock art is made difficult by the lack of organic material in the carvings that may be tested, so the researchers attempting to date them tested animal bones found associated with the carvings, assessed erosion patterns, and analysed tool marks in order to determine a correct date for the creation of the sculptures. This Neolithic dating would make the carvings significantly older than Stonehenge (5,000 years old) and the Egyptian pyramids at Giza (4,500 years old) and it predates estimates for the domestication of camels.

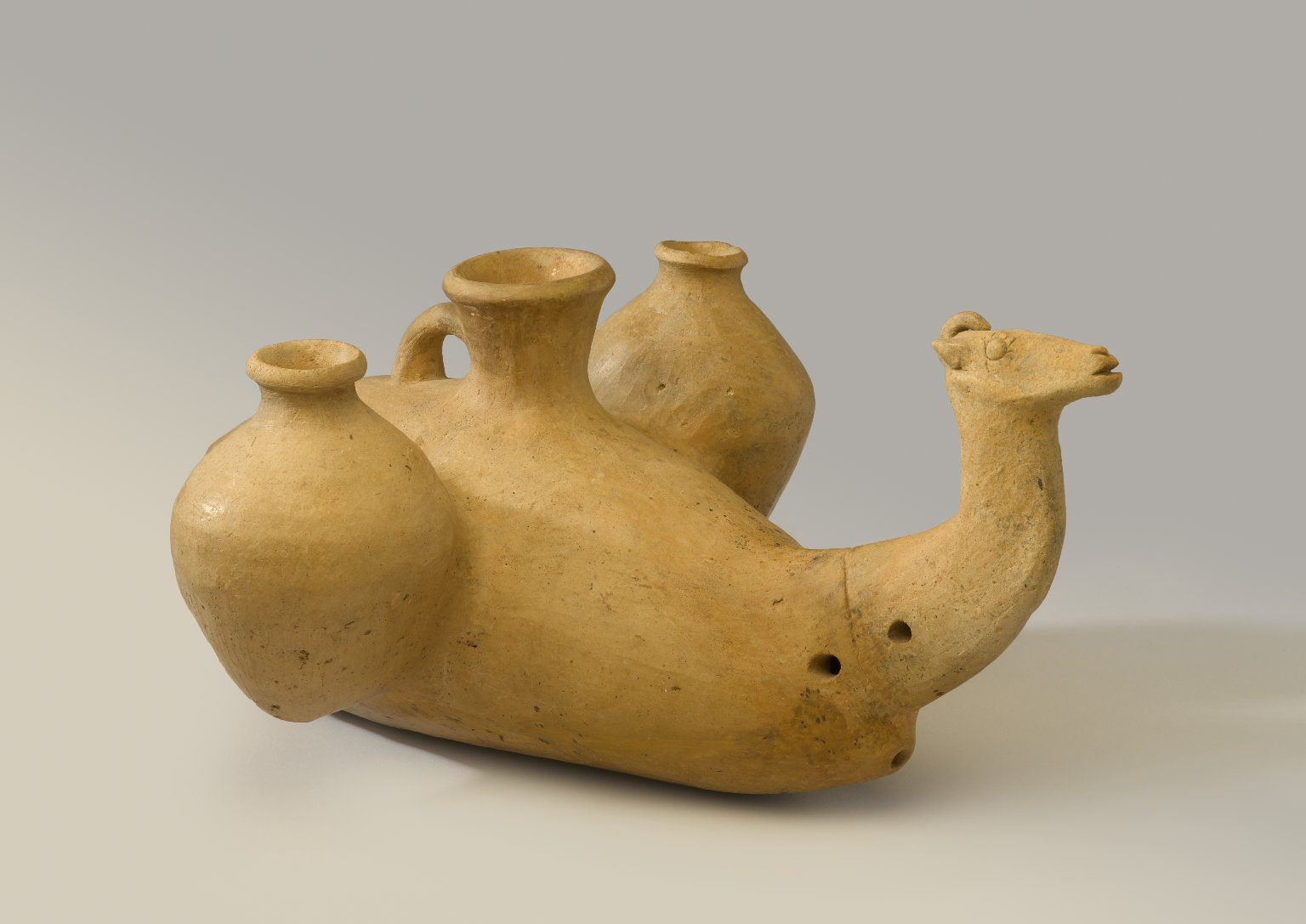
Vessel in the form of a recumbent camel with jugs, (c. 250 BC – 224 AD)

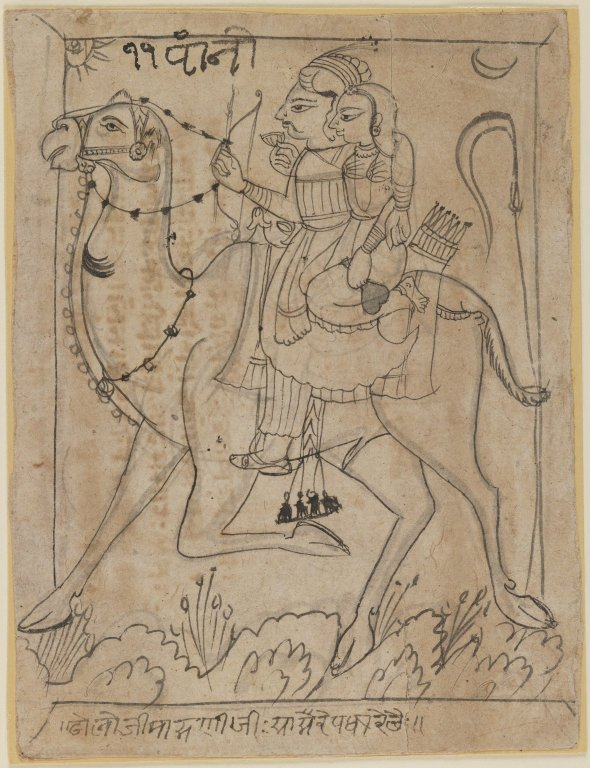
Maru Ragini (Dhola and Maru Riding on a Camel), (c. 1750)

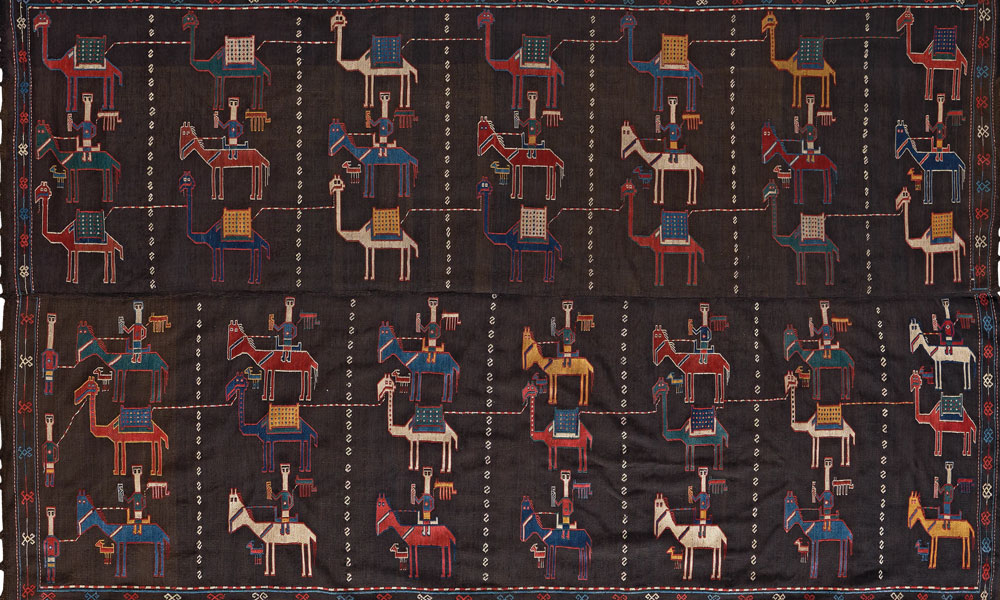
Shadda (cover, detail), Karabagh region, southwest Caucasus, early 19th century

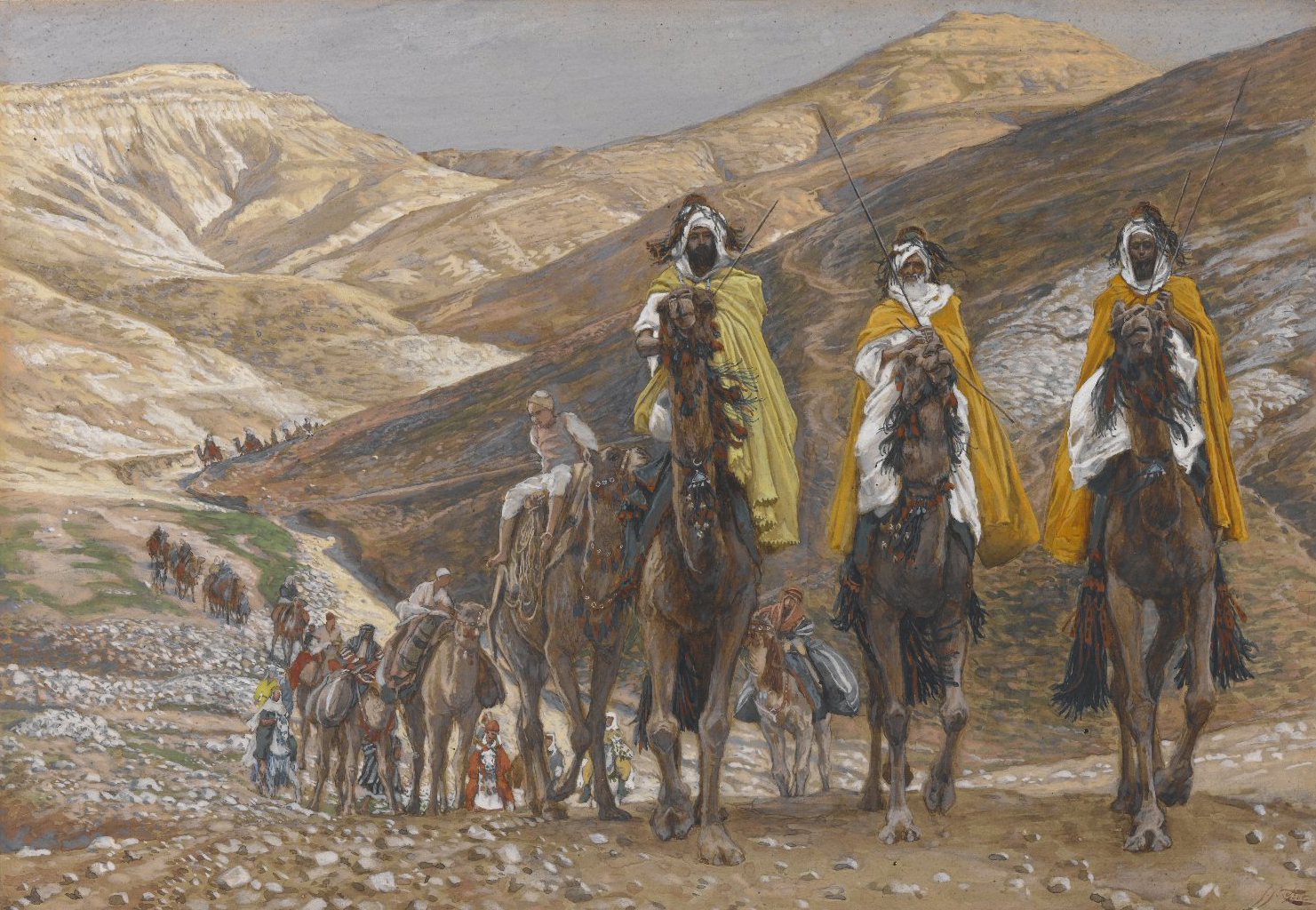
The Magi Journeying (Les rois mages en voyage)—James Tissot, (c. 1886)

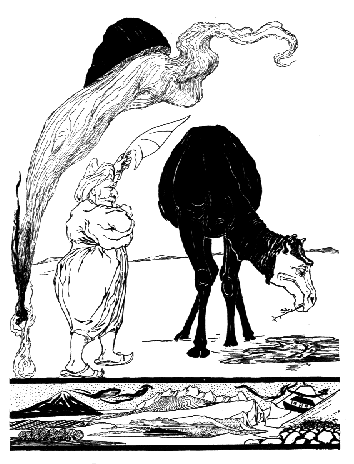
How the Camel Got His Hump (From Rudyard Kipling's Just So Stories), (1902)

== Distribution and numbers ==
Live camels

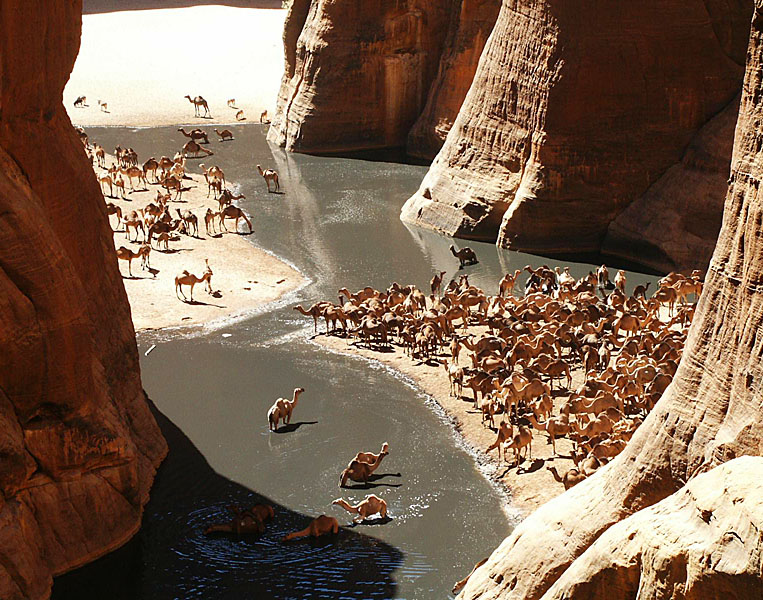
Camels in the Guelta d'Archei, in northeastern Chad

There are approximately 14 million camels alive as of 2010, with 90% being dromedaries. Dromedaries alive today are domesticated animals (mostly living in the Horn of Africa, the Sahel, Maghreb, Middle East and South Asia). The Horn region alone has the largest concentration of camels in the world, where the dromedaries constitute an important part of local nomadic life. They provide nomadic people in Somalia and Ethiopia with milk, food, and transportation.

Over one million dromedary camels are estimated to be feral in Australia, descended from those introduced as a method of transport in the 19th and early 20th centuries. This population is growing about 8% per year; it was estimated at 700,000 in 2008. Representatives of the Australian government have culled more than 100,000 of the animals in part because the camels use too much of the limited resources needed by sheep farmers.

A small population of introduced camels, dromedaries and Bactrians, wandered through Southwestern United States after having been imported in the 19th century as part of the U.S. Camel Corps experiment. When the project ended, they were used as draft animals in mines and escaped or were released. Twenty-five U.S. camels were bought and exported to Canada during the Cariboo Gold Rush.

The Bactrian camel is, as of 2010, reduced to an estimated 1.4 million animals, most of which are domesticated. The Wild Bactrian camel is the only truly wild (as opposed to feral) camel in the world. It is a distinct species that is not ancestral to the domestic Bactrian camel. The wild camels are critically endangered and number approximately 950, inhabiting the Gobi and Taklamakan Deserts in China and Mongolia.

== See also ==
- Afghan cameleers in Australia
- Australian feral camel
- Camel howdah
- Camel wrestling
- Camelops
- List of animals with humps
- Xerocole
