= Democrat Creek =

Stream in Missouri, U.S.

Coordinates: 40°08′38″N 92°11′12″W

Democrat Creek is a stream in Knox County in the U.S. state of Missouri. It is a tributary to Rock Creek. The confluence is approximately one mile south-southeast of Edina.

Democrat Creek was named for the fact a large share of the early settlers were Democrats.

== See also ==
- List of rivers of Missouri
