= Camelus grattardi =

Camelus grattardi Temporal range: Pliocene

Scientific classification
- Kingdom: Animalia
- Phylum: Chordata
- Class: Mammalia
- Order: Artiodactyla
- Family: Camelidae
- Genus: Camelus
- Species: †C. grattardi

Binomial name
- †Camelus grattardi Geraads, 2014

Extinct species of camel

Camelus grattardi is an extinct species of camel that inhabited Africa during the Pliocene and Pleistocene epochs.

== Distribution ==
Fossils of C. grattardi are known from Ethiopia.
