= Rock Creek, Illinois =

Rock Creek, Illinois may refer to:

- Rock Creek, Hardin County, Illinois, an unincorporated community in Hardin County, Illinois
- Rock Creek-Lima Township, Carroll County, Illinois, a township in Carrol County, Illinois
- Rock Creek No. 12 Precinct, Menard County, Illinois, a precinct in Menard County, Illinois
