= Rock Creek (South Fork South Fabius River tributary) =

Stream in the American state of Missouri

Coordinates: 40.152261°N 92.170737°W

Rock Creek is a stream in Knox County in the U.S. state of Missouri. It is a tributary of the South Fork South Fabius River.

Rock Creek was named for the character of its creek bed.

== Tributaries ==
- Democrat Creek

== See also ==
- List of rivers of Missouri
