= Rock Creek, California =

Human settlement in United States of America

Coordinates: 39.8228°N 121.8626°W

Rock Creek (also, Keefers Station, after James L. Keefer, the first postmaster) is a former settlement in Butte County, California, United States. It was located 7 miles (11 km) northwest of Chico. A post office operated in Rock Creek from 1858 to 1871. Rock Creek was an amalgamation of two smaller camps, Big Rock Creek and Little Rock Creek.
