= Rock Creek, Gilliam County, Oregon =

Unincorporated community in the state of Oregon, United States

- Unincorporated community
- Location within Oregon Location within the United States
- Coordinates: 45°34′21″N 120°17′50″W
- Country: United States
- State: Oregon
- County: Gilliam
- Elevation: 715 ft (218 m)
- Time zone: UTC-8 (Pacific (PST))
  - Summer (DST): UTC-7 (PDT)
- GNIS feature ID: 1126141

Rock Creek is an unincorporated community in Gilliam County, Oregon, United States. It lies along Rock Creek Lane in the northern part of the county, about 15 miles (24 km) southwest of Arlington.

A post office at Rock Creek was established along Rock Creek on June 3, 1872. Alexander Smith was the first postmaster, and James R. Alfrey was the second postmaster. The Rock Creek office closed on March 11, 1874, and an office opened on October 27 of that year in nearby Olex. This second office used Smith's first name, shortened to Alex, but misspelled as Olex.
