= Rock Creek (lower Missouri River tributary) =

Stream in Jackson County Missouri, U.S.

Coordinates: 39.121393°N 94.464397°W

Rock Creek is a stream in Jackson County in the U.S. state of Missouri. It is a tributary of the Missouri River.

Rock Creek was named for the rocks within its course.

== See also ==
- List of rivers of Missouri
