= Rock Creek (Fountain Creek tributary) =

River in Colorado, United States

Coordinates: 38°38′30″N 104°44′03″W

Rock Creek is the southern boundary of Cheyenne Mountain and a tributary of Fountain Creek at Fort Carson in Colorado.

== See also ==
- List of rivers of Colorado
