= Rock Creek (Minnesota) =

Stream in Chisago and Pine County, Minnesota, U.S.

Coordinates: 45°42′47″N 92°52′07″W

Rock Creek is a stream in Chisago and Pine counties, in the U.S. state of Minnesota.

Rock Creek was named for the rock outcroppings near its mouth.

== See also ==
- List of rivers of Minnesota
