= Syrian camel =

Scientific classification
- Kingdom: Animalia
- Phylum: Chordata
- Class: Mammalia
- Order: Artiodactyla
- Family: Camelidae
- Genus: Camelus
- Species: †C. moreli

Binomial name
- †Camelus moreli Martini, 2019

Species of mammal (fossil)

The Syrian camel (Camelus moreli) is an extinct species of camel from Syria. It has been discovered in the Hummal area of the western Syrian Desert. Found to have existed around 100,000 years ago, the camel was up to 3 m (9.8 ft) tall at the shoulder, and 4 m (13 ft) tall overall. The first of the fossils were discovered late in 2005, and several more were discovered about a year later. The camelid was found together with Middle Paleolithic human remains.
