= Rock Creek, Texas =

- Unincorporated community
- Location within Texas Location within the United States
- Coordinates: 31°40′02″N 97°14′30″W
- Country: United States
- State: Texas
- County: McLennan
- Elevation: 463 ft (141 m)
- Time zone: UTC-6 (Central (CST))
  - Summer (DST): UTC-5 (CDT)
- ZIP code: 76633
- Area code: 254
- GNIS feature ID: 1345371

Rock Creek is an unincorporated community in McLennan County, Texas. It is near the headwaters of Rock Creek, a tributary of the Brazos River.

== History ==
Settlement in this area began shortly after the Civil War, and Rock Creek grew quickly. By the end of the 19th century, it had a cotton gin, several businesses, and two churches. However, a tornado destroyed much of the community in 1913, and many residents left instead of rebuilding. By the 1980s, the population was estimated at 25, and only two businesses remained in the community.
