= Rock Creek (John Day River tributary) =

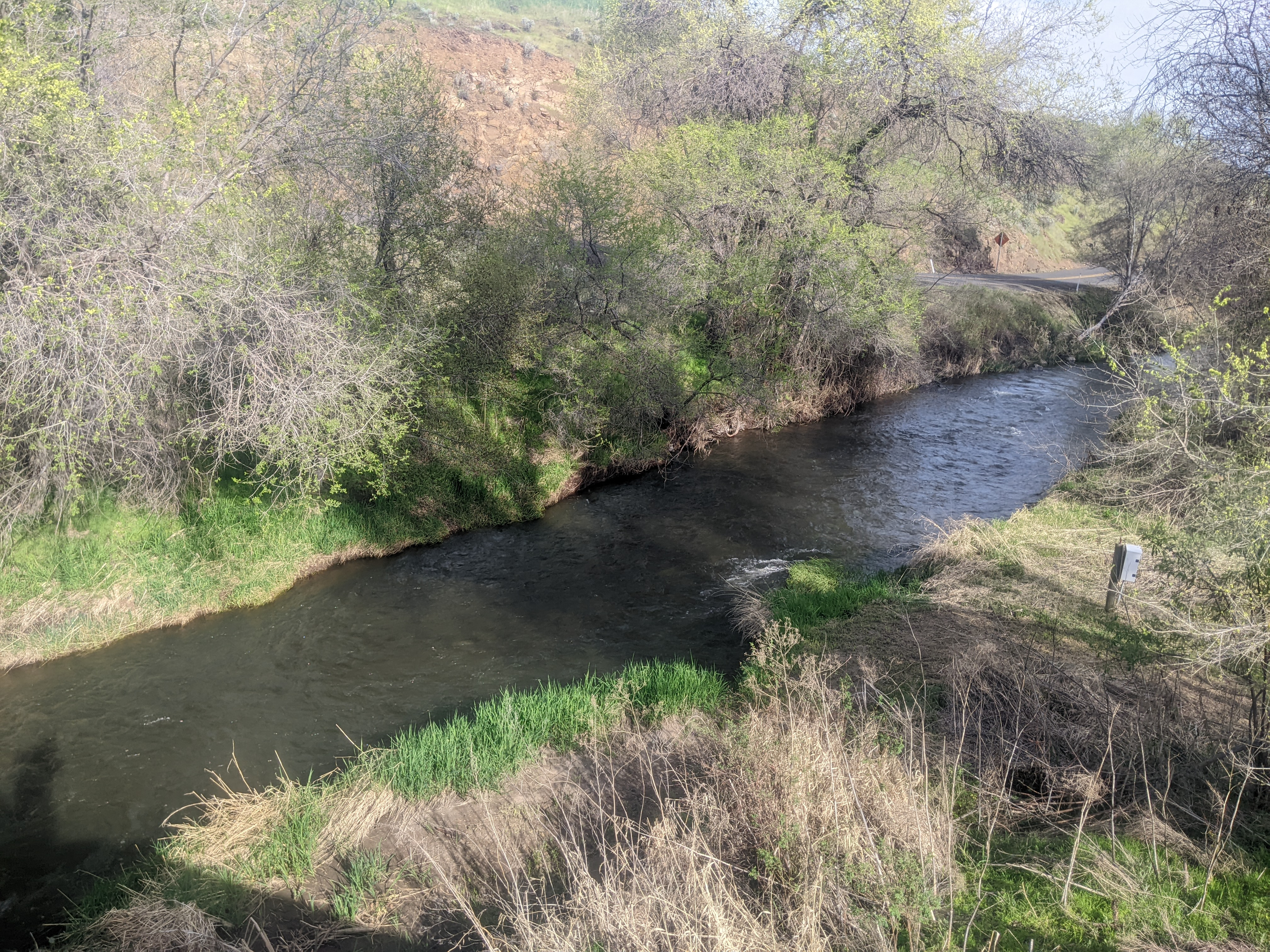
- Rock Creek at John Day Highway

- Location of the mouth of Rock Creek in Oregon

Location
- Country: United States
- State: Oregon
- County: Gilliam

Physical characteristics
- Source: east of Condon
  - location: Gilliam County, Oregon
  - coordinates: 45°02′00″N 119°34′35″W
  - elevation: 4,351 ft (1,326 m)
- Mouth: John Day River
  - location: Gilliam County, Oregon
  - coordinates: 45°34′36″N 120°24′17″W
  - elevation: 404 ft (123 m)
- Length: 82 mi (132 km)
- Basin size: 507 sq mi (1,310 km^{2})

Rock Creek is an 82-mile (132 km) tributary of the John Day River in the U.S. state of Oregon. The source of the creek is at an elevation of 4,351 feet (1,326 m) in the Umatilla National Forest, while the mouth is at an elevation of 404 feet (123 m) east of Wasco. Rock Creek has a 507-square-mile (1,310 km^{2}) watershed.

== See also ==
- List of rivers of Oregon
- List of longest streams of Oregon
