= 2012 in paleomammalogy =

This paleomammalogy list records new fossil mammal taxa that were described during the year 2012, as well as notes other significant paleomammalogy discoveries and events which occurred during that year.

== Non-eutherian mammals ==
Name	Novelty	Status	Authors	Age	Unit	Location	Notes	Images
Abderites aisenense	Sp. nov	Valid	Abello & Rubilar Rogers	Middle Miocene	Collón Cura Formation; Río Frías Formation	Argentina; Chile	A marsupial, a member of Paucituberculata, a species of Abderites.	
Condorodon	Gen. et sp. nov	Valid	Gaetano & Rougier	Middle Jurassic	Cañadón Asfalto Formation	Argentina	An amphilestid. The type species is Condorodon spanios.	
?Ectypodus riansensis	Sp. nov	Valid	Vianey-Liaud in Marandat et al.	Earliest Eocene		France	A neoplagiaulacid multituberculate, possibly a species of Ectypodus.	
Greniodon	Gen. et sp. nov	Valid	Goin et al.	Eocene (early Lutetian)	Andesitas Huancache Formation	Argentina	A gondwanatherian. The type species is Greniodon sylvaticus.	
Kouriogenys	Gen. et comb. nov	Valid	Davis	Berriasian		United Kingdom	A peramuran mammal, a new genus for the species originally named Spalacotherium minus Owen 1871.	
Peramuroides	Gen. et sp. nov	Valid	Davis	Berriasian		United Kingdom	A peramuran mammal. The type species is Peramuroides tenuiscus.	
Priscakoala	Gen. et sp. nov	Valid	Black, Archer, & Hand	Miocene	Riversleigh World Heritage Area fossil deposit	Australia	A phascolarctid.	
Thylacodon montanensis	Sp. nov	Valid	Williamson et al.	Palaeocene		United States	A metatherian closely related to Swaindelphys and Herpetotheriidae, a species of Thylacodon.	
Tjukuru	Gen. et sp. nov	Valid	Prideaux & Tedford	Pliocene	Tirari Formation	Australia	A lagostrophine kangaroo. The type species is Tjukuru wellsi.	

== Eutherians ==
=== Research ===
- A phylogenetic analysis of living and fossil members of Carnivoramorpha is published by Michelle Spaulding and John J. Flynn (2012).
- A study of fossil giant deers is published by I. A. Vislobokova (2012).
- A study of the anatomy of skull and teeth of the proboscidean Eritherium azzouzorum is published by Emmanuel Gheerbrant, Baadi Bouya and Mbarek Amaghzaz (2012).

=== New taxa ===
Name	Novelty	Status	Authors	Age	Unit	Location	Notes	Images
Acritophiomys	Gen. et sp. nov	Valid	Sallam, Seiffert & Simons	Late Eocene		Egypt	A phiomorph. The type species is Acritophiomys bowni.	
Adjidaumo lophatus	Sp. nov	Valid	Korth	Eocene (Chadronian)		United States	An eomyid rodent, a species of Adjidaumo.	
Aepyceros datoadeni	sp nov	Valid	Geraads, Bobe & Reed	Pliocene	Hadar Formation	Ethiopia	A species of impala.	
Afrasia	Gen. et sp. nov	Valid	Chaimanee et al.	Eocene	Pondaung Formation	Myanmar	A primitive anthropoid. The type species is Afrasia djijidae.	
Afrodon gheerbranti	sp nov	Valid	De Bast, Sigé & Smith	Early Palaeocene	Hainin Formation	Belgium	An adapisoriculid, a species of Afrodon.	
Aguascalientia minuta	sp nov	Valid	Rincon, Bloch, Suarez, MacFadden & Jaramillo	Early Miocene	Las Cascadas Formation	Panama	A floridatraguline camelid, a species of Aguascalientia.	
Aguascalientia panamaensis	sp nov	Valid	Rincon, Bloch, Suarez, MacFadden & Jaramillo	Early Miocene	Las Cascadas Formation	Panama	A floridatraguline camelid, a species of Aguascalientia.	
Ailuravus subita	sp nov	Valid	Compte, Sabatier & Vianey-Liaud	Eocene (Bartonian)		France	A pseudosciurid rodent. Originally described as a species of Ailuravus, but subsequently made the type species of a separate genus Auroremys.	
Alloptox (Mizuhoptox) japonicus	Subgen. and sp. nov	Valid	Tomida	Early Miocene		Japan	A pika, a species of Alloptox.	
Alloptox katinkae	sp nov	Valid	Angelone & Hír	Early Middle Miocene		Hungary	A pika, a species of Alloptox.	
Anchilophus (Paranchilophus) jeanteti	sp nov	Valid	Remy	Eocene (Bartonian)		France	A member of Palaeotheriidae, a species of Anchilophus.	
Ancylotherium hellenicum	Sp. nov	Valid	Koufos	Late Miocene		Greece	A chalicothere, a species of Ancylotherium.	
Andemys	Gen. et sp. nov	Valid	Bertrand et al.	Tinguirirican	Abanico Formation	Chile	A caviomorph rodent related to dasyproctids. The type species is Andemys termasi.	
Apterodon langebadreae	sp nov	Valid	Grohé et al.	Eocene (late Bartonian)		Libya	A hyaenodontid, a species of Apterodon.	
Archaeophocaena	Gen. et sp. nov.	Valid	Murakami et al.	Late Miocene	Koetoi Formation	Japan	A porpoise. The type species is Archaeophocaena teshioensis.	
Asilifelis	Gen. et sp. nov.	Valid	Werdelin	Early Miocene	Hiwegi Formation	Kenya	A felid. The type species is Asilifelis cotae.	
Babameryx	Gen. et sp. nov	Valid	Mennecart et al.	Late Oligocene		Switzerland	A ruminant. The type species is Babameryx engesseri.	
Bagacricetodon	Gen. et sp. nov	Valid	Rodrigues, Marivaux & Vianey-Liaud	Oligocene		China	A cricetid rodent. The type species is Bagacricetodon tongi.	
Barberapithecus	Gen. et sp. nov	Valid	Alba & Moyà-Solà	Middle to Late Miocene		Spain	A crouzeliine pliopithecid. The type species is Barberapithecus huerzeleri.	
Bartelsia	Gen. et sp. nov	Valid	Gunnell	Early Eocene (earliest Bridgerian)		United States	A plesiadapiform, a relative of Uintasorex. The type species is Bartelsia pentadactyla.	
Berrulestes	Gen. et 3 sp. nov	Valid	Hooker & Russell	Paleocene		France	A macroscelidean. The type species is Berrulestes phelizoni; the other species are B. pellouini and B. poirieri.	
Bohaskaia	Gen. et sp. nov	Valid	Vélez-Juarbe & Pyenson	Early Pliocene	Yorktown Formation	United States	A monodontid. The type species is Bohaskaia monodontoides.	
Bomburodon	Nom. nov.	Valid	Williamson & Carr	Paleocene		United States	A replacement name for the condylarth genus Bomburia Van Valen, 1978.	
Borisodon	Gen. et comb. nov	Valid	Archibald & Averianov	Turonian		Kazakhstan	A zhelestid, a new genus for "Sorlestes" kara (Nessov, 1993).	
Bustylus folieae	sp nov	Valid	De Bast, Sigé, & Smith	Early Palaeocene	Hainin Formation	Belgium	An adapisoriculid, a species of Bustylus.	
Cachiyacuy	Gen. and 2 sp. nov	Valid	Antoine et al.	Eocene (latest Lutetian, approx. 41 Ma)	Yahuarango Formation	Peru	A caviomorph rodent. Genus contains two species: Cachiyacuy contamanensis and Cachiyacuy kummeli.	
Canaanimys	Gen. and sp. nov	Valid	Antoine et al.	Eocene (latest Lutetian, approx. 41 Ma)	Yahuarango Formation	Peru	A caviomorph rodent. The type species is Canaanimys maquiensis.	
Canis arnensis kudarensis	Subsp. nov	Valid	Baryshnikov	Middle Pleistocene		South Ossetia	A small coyote-like canid, a subspecies of Canis arnensis.	
Canis lupus maximus	Subsp. nov.	Valid	Boudadi-Maligne	Late Pleistocene		France	A subspecies of gray wolf.	
Carposorex burkarti	sp nov	Valid	Hugueney, Mein & Maridet	Miocene		France	A shrew, a species of Carposorex.	
Centimanomys gigantus	Sp. nov	Valid	Korth	Eocene (Chadronian)		United States	An eomyid rodent, a species of Centimanomys.	
Chubutomys navaensis	sp nov	Valid	Pérez, Krause & Vucetich	Late Oligocene	Sarmiento Formation	Argentina	A member of Hystricognathi, a cavioid rodent; a species of Chubutomys.	
Colpodon antucoensis	sp nov	Valid	Shockey et al.	Miocene	Cura-Mallín Formation	Chile	A leontiniid notoungulate, a species of Colpodon.	
Coryphodon pisuqti	Sp. nov	Valid	Dawson	Wasatchian	Margaret Formation	Canada	A pantodont, a species of Coryphodon.	
Cristadjidaumo skinneri	sp nov	Valid	Emry & Korth	Late Eocene	White River Formation	United States	An eomyid, a species of Cristadjidaumo.	
Dakotallomys whitei	Sp. nov	Valid	Korth	Oligocene (Orellan)	Dunbar Creek Formation	United States	An aplodontiid rodent belonging to the subfamily Prosciurinae.	
Damalborea grayi	sp nov	Valid	Geraads, Bobe & Reed	Pliocene	Hadar Formation	Ethiopia	A member of Alcelaphini.	
Damaliscus hypsodon	Sp. nov	Valid	Faith et al.	Middle Pleistocene		Kenya; Tanzania	An alcelaphine bovid, a species of Damaliscus.	
Dasychoerus natrunensis	Sp. nov	Valid	Pickford	Late Miocene to early Pliocene		Egypt	A suid, a species of Dasychoerus (considered by some authors to be a subgenus of the genus Sus).	
Dryomomys dulcifer	sp nov	Valid	Chester & Beard	Late Paleocene	Big Multi Quarry	United States	A micromomyid plesiadapiform, a species of Dryomomys.	
Dushimys	Gen. et sp. nov	Valid	Zijlstra	Quaternary, probably middle Pleistocene		Curaçao	An oryzomyine sigmodontine rodent. The type species is Dushimys larsi.	
Elmerriggsia	Gen. et sp. nov	Valid	Shockey et al.	Late Oligocene		Argentina	A leontiniid notoungulate. The type species is Elmerriggsia fieldia.	
Eotheroides clavigerum	sp nov	Valid	Zalmout & Gingerich	Eocene (Priabonian)	Birket Qarun Formation	Egypt	A dugongid sirenian, a species of Eotheroides.	
Eotheroides sandersi	sp nov	Valid	Zalmout & Gingerich	Eocene (Priabonian)	Birket Qarun Formation	Egypt	A dugongid sirenian, a species of Eotheroides.	
Eotmantsoius	Gen. et sp. nov	Valid	Tabuce et al.	Middle or Late Eocene		Libya	A member of Macroscelidea. The type species is Eotmantsoius perseverans.	
Eoviscaccia frassinettii	Sp. nov	Valid	Bertrand et al.	Tinguirirican	Abanico Formation	Chile	A caviomorph rodent related to chinchillids, a species of Eoviscaccia.	
Epipeltephilus kanti	sp nov	Valid	González Ruiz et al.	Late Miocene (Chasicoan)	Arroyo Chasicó Formation	Argentina	A peltephilid cingulate, a species of Epipeltephilus.	
Eptenonnus	Gen. et sp. nov	Valid	Rosina & Semenov	Late Miocene		Ukraine	A vesper bat. The type species is Eptenonnus gritsevensis.	
Eucricetodon bagus	Sp. nov	Valid	Rodrigues, Marivaux & Vianey-Liaud	Oligocene		China	A cricetid rodent, a species of Eucricetodon.	
Eucricetodon jilantaiensis	Sp. nov	Valid	Rodrigues, Marivaux & Vianey-Liaud	Oligocene		China	A cricetid rodent, a species of Eucricetodon.	
Gandheralophus	Gen. et sp. nov	Valid	Missiaen & Gingerich	Early Eocene	Ghazij Formation	Pakistan	An isectolophid tapiromorph. Its species are G. minor and G. robustus.	
Gazella harmonae	sp nov	Valid	Geraads, Bobe & Reed	Pliocene	Hadar Formation	Ethiopia	A species of gazelle.	
Geotrypus minor	sp nov	Valid	Ziegler	Early Oligocene		Germany	A talpid. Originally described as a species of Geotrypus; subsequently transferred to the separate genus Tegulariscaptor.	
Gigarton	Gen. et 3 sp. nov	Valid	Hooker & Russell	Paleocene		France	A macroscelidean. The type species is Gigarton meyeri; the other species are G. sigogneauae and G. louisi.	
Gobiolagus aliwusuensis	Sp. nov	Valid	Fostowicz-Frelik et al.	Middle Eocene		China	A palaeolagid lagomorph, a species of Gobiolagus.	
Hanakia agadjaniani	sp nov	Valid	Rosina & Rummel	Early Miocene		Germany	A vesper bat, a species of Hanakia.	
Hesperogaulus shotwelli	sp nov	Valid	Calede & Hopkins	Miocene		United States	A mylagaulid, a species of Hesperogaulus.	
Holmesina rondoniensis	sp nov	Valid	Góis et al.	Late Pleistocene	Rio Madeira Formation	Brazil	A pampatheriid cingulate, a species of Holmesina.	
Indusomys	Nom. nov	Valid	Gunnell et al.	Eocene		Pakistan	A replacement name for the primate genus Indusius Gunnell, Gingerich, Ul-Haw, Bloch, Kahn and Clyde, 2008.	
Kretzoiarctos	Gen. et comb. nov	Valid	Abella et al.	Middle Miocene	Calatayud-Daroca Basin	Spain	An ailuropodine bear, a new genus for "Agriarctos" beatrix Abella, Montoya & Morales (2011).	
Kurdalagonus	Gen. et sp. nov	Valid	Tarasenko & Lopatin	Miocene	Blinovo Formation	Russia	A baleen whale belonging to the family Cetotheriidae. The type species is Kurdalagonus mchedlidzei. Tarasenko & Lopatin (2012) originally assigned the new species K. adygeicus, as well as the species "Cetotherium" maicopicum Spasskii, 1951 to the genus Kurdalagonus as well; however, Gol'din & Startsev (2016) excluded K. adygeicus from the genus and stated that "C." maicopicum requires further research to determine its phylogenetic affinities.	
Lainodon ragei	Sp. nov.	Valid	Gheerbrant & Astibia	Late Cretaceous (Campanian or Maastrichtian)		Spain	A zhelestid, a species of Lainodon.	
Leptacodon donkroni	sp nov	Valid	Rose et al.	Earliest Eocene	Willwood Formation	United States	A nyctitheriid soricomorph, a species of Leptacodon.	
Leptophoca amphiatlantica	sp nov	Disputed	Koretsky, Ray & Peters	Miocene	Breda Formation; Calvert Formation; St Mary's Formation	Netherlands; United States	An earless seal. Dewaele, Lambert & Louwye (2017) considered this species to be nomen dubium.	
Litolophus ghazijensis	Species	Valid	Missiaen & Gingerich	Early Eocene	Ghazij Formation	Pakistan	An eomoropid chalicotherioid, a species of Litolophus.	
Louisina marci	sp nov	Valid	Hooker & Russell	Paleocene		France	A macroscelidean, a species of Louisina.	
Megaleptictis	Gen. et sp. nov	Valid	Meehan & Martin	Chadronian/?Orellan	White River Group	United States	A large leptictid.	
Megalomys georginae	Sp. nov	Valid	Turvey, Brace & Weksler	?Late Pleistocene–late Holocene		Barbados	A rice rat, a species of Megalomys.	
Meherrinia	Gen. et sp. nov	Valid	Geisler, Godfrey 7 Lambert	Late Miocene	Eastover Formation	United States	A river dolphin.	
Melaneremia schrevei	Sp. nov	Valid	Hooker	Eocene (earliest Ypresian)	Woolwich Formation	United Kingdom	A microchoerine omomyid primate, a species of Melaneremia.	
Mellalechinus	Nom. nov		Zijlstra	Miocene		Morocco	An erinaceid; a replacement name for Protechinus Lavocat (1961).	
Mesonyx nuhetingensis	Sp. nov	Valid	Jin	Early Eocene	Arshanto Formation	China	A mesonychid, a species of Mesonyx.	
Metanchilophus	Gen. et comb. et 2 sp. et. subsp. nov	Valid	Remy	Eocene		France; Switzerland; United Kingdom	A member of Palaeotheriidae. A new genus for "Anchilophus" dumasi; genus also contains "Anchilophus" radegondensis, "Anchilophus" gaudini (including new subspecies Metanchilophus gaudini fontensis) and "Anchilophus" depereti, as well as new species Metanchilophus castrensis and Metanchilophus chaubeti.	
Metanoiamys paradoxus	Species	Valid	Emry & Korth	Late Eocene	White River Formation	United States	An eomyid, a species of Metanoiamys.	
Miocaperea	Gen. et sp. nov	Valid	Bisconti	Miocene	Pisco Formation	Peru	A neobalaenid (a relative of pygmy right whale). The type species is Miocaperea pulchra.	
Miophocaena	Gen. et sp. nov.	Valid	Murakami et al.	Late Miocene	Koetoi Formation	Japan	A porpoise. The type species is Miophocaena nishinoi.	
Miostrellus petersbuchensis	sp nov	Valid	Rosina & Rummel	Early Miocene		Germany	A vesper bat, a species of Miostrellus.	
Morlodon	Gen. et sp. nov	Valid	Solé	Early Eocene		Europe	A proviverrine hyaenodontid. The type species is Morlodon vellerei.	
Mylagaulus cornusaulax	sp nov	Valid	Czaplewski	Late Miocene		United States	A mylagaulid rodent.	
Myotis korotkevichae	Sp. nov	Valid	Rosina & Semenov	Late Miocene		Ukraine	A mouse-eared bat.	
Namatomys erythrus	sp nov	Valid	Emry & Korth	Late Eocene	White River Formation	United States	An eomyid, a species of Namatomys.	
Nanomomys	Gen. et sp. nov	Valid	Rose et al.	Earliest Eocene	Willwood Formation	United States	A plesiadapiform, a possible member of Microsyopidae. The type species is Nanomomys thermophilus.	
Nementchatherium rathbuni	Sp. nov	Valid	Tabuce et al.	Middle or Late Eocene		Libya	A member of Macroscelidea, a species of Nementchatherium.	
Neophiomys	Gen. et comb. nov	Valid	Coster et al.	Early Oligocene		Libya	A rodent, a member of Hystricognathi; a new genus for "Phiomys" paraphiomyoides Wood, 1968.	
Nesiotites rafelinensis	sp nov	Valid	Rofes et al.	Early Pliocene		Spain	A shrew, a species of Nesiotites. Argued by different authors to be either a probable junior synonym of Nesiotites ponsi or a valid and distinct species.	
Nestoritherium linxiaense	sp nov	Valid	Chen, Deng, He & Chen	Early Late Miocene	Liushu Formation	China	A chalicothere, a species of Nestoritherium.	
Omanitherium	Gen. et sp. nov	Valid	Seiffert et al.	Earliest Oligocene (earliest Rupelian)	Ashawq Formation	Oman	A proboscidean, a relative of Barytherium. The type species is Omanitherium dhofarensis.	
Pappocricetodon neimongolensis	Sp. nov	Valid	Li	Middle Eocene	Irdin Manha Formation	China	A cricetid rodent, a species of Pappocricetodon.	
Parastegosimpsonia	Gen. et sp. nov	Valid	Ciancio et al.	Paleogene (?Eocene)		Peru	An astegotheriine dasypodid armadillo. The type species is Parastegosimpsonia peruana; genus might contain a second, yet-unnamed species.	
Pardinamys	Gen. et sp. nov	Valid	Ortiz, Jayat & Steppan	Late Pliocene (Uquian)	Uquía Formation	Argentina	A phyllotine sigmodontine rodent. The type species is Pardinamys humahuaquensis.	
Paromomys libedianus	sp nov	Valid	Silcox & Williamson	Early Paleocene (Torrejonian)	Nacimiento Formation	United States	A paromomyid plesiadapiform, a species of Paromomys.	
Paschatherium levei	sp nov	Valid	Hooker & Russell	Early Eocene		France	A macroscelidean, a species of Paschatherium.	
Phiocricetomys atavus	Sp. nov	Valid	Coster et al.	Early Oligocene		Libya	A rodent, a member of Hystricognathi; a species of Phiocricetomys.	
Plagioctenoides tombowni	sp nov	Valid	Rose et al.	Earliest Eocene	Willwood Formation	United States	A nyctitheriid soricomorph, a species of Plagioctenoides.	
Platychoerops antiquus	Sp. nov	Valid	Boyer, Costeur & Lipman	Paleocene		France	A plesiadapid, a species of Platychoerops.	
Platygonus pollenae	Sp. nov	Valid	Prothero & Grenader	Late Miocene (Hemphillian)		United States	A peccary, a species of Platygonus.	
Plecotus schoepfelii	sp nov	Valid	Rosina & Rummel	Early Miocene		Germany	A vesper bat, a species of Plecotus.	
Plesiodipus wangae	Sp. nov	Valid	Rodrigues, Marivaux & Vianey-Liaud	Oligocene		China	A cricetid rodent, a species of Plesiodipus.	
Plesiotypotherium casirense	Sp. nov	Valid	Cerdeño et al.	Late Miocene		Bolivia	A mesotheriid notoungulatan, a species of Plesiotypotherium.	
Pristifelis	Gen. et comb. nov	Valid	Salesa et al.	Miocene		Western Eurasia	A feline felid, a new genus for Felis attica.	
Prodendrogale engesseri	sp nov	Valid	Ni & Qiu	Late Miocene		China	A treeshrew, a species of Prodendrogale.	
Proeggysodon	Gen. et sp. nov	Valid	Bai & Wang	Late Eocene	Possibly Ulan Gochu Formation	China	An odd-toed ungulate, an eggysodontine rhinocerotoid. The type species is Proeggysodon qiui.	
Prolouisina	Gen. et comb. nov	Valid	Hooker & Russell	Paleocene		Germany	A macroscelidean, a new genus for "Louisina" atavella (Russell, 1964).	
Proremiculus	Gen. et sp. nov	Valid	De Bast, Sigé & Smith	Early Palaeocene	Hainin Formation	Belgium	An adapisoriculid. Its type species is Proremiculus lagnauxi.	
Protictitherium thessalonikensis	sp nov	Valid	Koufos	Late Miocene		Greece	An ictitheriine hyena, a species of Protictitherium.	
Pseudocricetops	Gen. et sp. nov	Valid	Rodrigues, Marivaux & Vianey-Liaud	Oligocene		China	A cricetid rodent. The type species is Pseudocricetops matthewi.	
Pseudoloris cuestai	sp nov	Valid	Minwer-Barakat, Marigó & Moyà-Solà	Middle Eocene		Spain	A microchoerine omomyid, a species of Pseudoloris.	
Pterophocaena	Gen. et sp. nov.	Valid	Murakami et al.	Late Miocene	Wakkanai Formation	Japan	A porpoise. The type species is Pterophocaena nishinoi.	
Pucatherium	Gen. et sp. nov	Valid	Herrera, Powell & Del Papa	Middle–late Eocene	Casa Grande Formation; Geste Formation; Lumbrera Formation; Quebrada de los Colorados Formation	Argentina	An armadillo of uncertain phylogenetic placement. The type species is Pucatherium parvum.	
Remys major	Sp. nov	Valid	Compte, Sabatier & Vianey-Liaud	Eocene (Bartonian)		France; Switzerland	A theridomyid rodent, a species of Remys.	
Sinomastodon jiangnanensis	Sp. nov	Valid	Wang et al.	Early Pleistocene		China	A gomphothere, a species of Sinomastodon.	
Skouraia	Gen. et sp. nov	Valid	Geraads, El Boughabi & Zouhri	Late Miocene	Aït Kandoula Formation	Morocco	A caprin bovid. The type species is Skouraia helicoides.	
Styriofelis vallesiensis	sp nov	Valid	Salesa et al.	Late Miocene		Spain	A feline felid. Originally described as a species of Styriofelis, but subsequently transferred to the separate genus Leptofelis.	
Sulaimanius	Nom. nov	Valid	Gunnell et al.	Eocene		Pakistan	A replacement name for the primate genus Sulaimania Gunnell, Gingerich, Ul-Haw, Bloch, Kahn and Clyde, 2008.	
Sylvochoerus	Gen. et sp. nov	Disputed	Frailey & Campbell	Late Miocene or Quaternary	Madre de Dios Formation	Western Amazon Basin	A peccary. The type species is Sylvochoerus woodburnei. Gasparini et al. (2021) considered S. woodburnei to be a junior synonym of the white-lipped peccary.	
Tachyoryctoides engesseri	sp nov	Valid	Wang & Qiu	Early Miocene	Lanzhou Basin	China	A muroid rodent, a species of Tachyoryctoides.	
Tachyoryctoides minor	sp nov	Valid	Wang & Qiu	Early Miocene	Lanzhou Basin	China	A muroid rodent, a species of Tachyoryctoides.	
Tardenomys	Gen. et sp. nov	Valid	Compte, Sabatier & Vianey-Liaud	Eocene (Bartonian)		France; Switzerland	A theridomyid rodent. The type species is Tardenomys chartreuvensis.	
Teilhardimys brisswalteri	sp nov	Valid	Hooker & Russell	Paleocene		France	A macroscelidean, a species of Teilhardimys.	
Teilhardina gingerichi	Sp. nov	Disputed	Rose et al.	Earliest Eocene	Willwood Formation	United States	An omomyid primate, a species of Teilhardina. Considered to be a junior synonym of Teilhardina brandti by Morse et al. (2019).	
Thryptodon	Gen. et sp. nov	Valid	Hooker & Russell	Paleocene		France	A macroscelidean. The type species is Thryptodon brailloni.	
Tinimomys tribos	sp nov	Valid	Chester & Beard	Late Paleocene	Big Multi Quarry	United States	A micromomyid plesiadapiform, a species of Tinimomys.	
Tragomys	Gen. et sp. nov	Valid	Agusti, Bover & Alcover	Pliocene		Spain	A cricetid rodent. The type species is Tragomys macpheei.	
Tupaia storchi	sp nov	Valid	Ni & Qiu	Late Miocene		China	A treeshrew, a species of Tupaia.	
Turkanamys	Gen. et sp. nov	Valid	Marivaux et al.	Late Oligocene		Kenya	A phiomorph rodent. The type species is Turkanamys hexalophus.	
Tuscahomys walshi	Sp. nov	Valid	Anemone, Dawson & Beard	Early Eocene (late early Wasatchian)		United States	A cylindrodontid rodent, a species of Tuscahomys.	
Tuscahomys worlandensis	Sp. nov	Valid	Rose et al.	Earliest Eocene	Willwood Formation	United States	A cylindrodontid rodent, a species of Tuscahomys.	
Vampalus	Gen. et sp. et comb. nov	Valid	Tarasenko & Lopatin	Miocene		Russia	A cetotheriid baleen whale belonging to the subfamily Herpetocetinae. The type species is Vampalus sayasanicus from Chechnya; genus also contains "Cetotherium" helmerseni Brandt, 1871 from Krasnodar Krai.	
Vasseuromys cristinae	sp nov	Valid	Ruiz-Sánchez et al.	Middle Miocene		Spain	A dormouse, a species of Vasseuromys.	
Vasseuromys rambliensis	sp nov	Valid	Ruiz-Sánchez et al.	Lower Miocene		Spain	A dormouse, a species of Vasseuromys.	
Victoriaceros	Gen. et sp. nov	Valid	Geraads, McCrossin & Benefit	Middle Miocene	Makobo beds	Kenya	An elasmotheriine rhinoceros. Type species is Victoriaceros kenyensis.	
Victoriamys	Gen. et comb. nov	Valid	Martin	Pleistocene		Italy; Spain	A vole, a new genus for the species "Allophaiomys" chalinei.	
Viretia	Gen. et comb. nov	Valid	Hugueney, Mein and Maridet	Miocene		France; Slovakia	A shrew, a new genus for "Sorex" gracilidens.	
Walbeckodon	Gen. et 2 sp. nov	Valid	Hooker & Russell	Paleocene		France; Germany	A macroscelidean. The type species is Walbeckodon krumbiegeli; the second species is Walbeckodon girardi.	
Waldochoerus	Gen. et sp. nov	Disputed	Frailey & Campbell	Late Miocene or Quaternary		Western Amazon Basin	A peccary. The type species is Waldochoerus bassleri. Gasparini et al. (2021) considered W. bassleri to be a junior synonym of the collared peccary.	
Witenia yolua	Sp. nov	Valid	Rodrigues, Marivaux & Vianey-Liaud	Oligocene		China	A cricetid rodent, a species of Witenia.	
Witwatia sigei	Sp. nov	Valid	Ravel et al.	Early Eocene		Tunisia	A philisid bat, a species of Witwatia.	
Yamatocetus	Gen. et sp. nov	Valid	Okazaki	Late Oligocene	Jinnobaru Formation	Japan	An eomysticetid baleen whale. The type species is Yamatocetus canaliculatus.	
Yuruatherium	Gen. et sp. et comb. nov	Valid	Ciancio et al.	Paleogene (including Eocene)		Argentina; Peru	A member of Cingulata of uncertain phylogenetic placement, similar to Machlydotherium and Eocoleophorus. The type species is Paleogene (?Eocene) Yuruatherium tropicalis; genus also contains Eocene (Mustersan) "Machlydotherium" intortum Ameghino.	
