= Bruce MacFadden =

American paleontologist

Bruce J. MacFadden is an American vertebrate paleontologist, a significant figure in his field, currently a Distinguished Professor, Emeritus at University of Florida.

Below is a list of taxa that MacFadden has contributed to naming:

Year	Taxon	Authors
2023	Americanycteris cyrtodon gen. et sp. nov.	Morgan, Czaplewski, Rincon, Bloch, Wood, & MacFadden
2015	Paratoceras orarius sp. nov.	Rincon, Bloch, MacFadden, & Jaramillo
2015	Paratoceras coatesi sp. nov.	Rincon, Bloch, MacFadden, & Jaramillo
2012	Aguascalientia minuta sp. nov.	Rincon, Bloch, Suarez, MacFadden, & Jaramillo
2012	Aguascalientia panamaensis sp. nov.	Rincon, Bloch, Suarez, MacFadden, & Jaramillo
2012	Rhinoclemmys panamaensis sp. nov.	Cadena, Bourque, Rincon, Bloch, Jaramillo, & MacFadden
2012	Staurotypus moschus sp. nov.	Cadena, Bourque, Rincon, Bloch, Jaramillo, & MacFadden
2003	Mesoreodon floridensis sp. nov.	MacFadden & Morgan

== Select publications ==
- Carmala N Garzione; Gregory D. Hoke; Julie C Libarkin; Saunia Withers; Bruce MacFadden; John Eiler; Prosenjit Ghosh; Andreas Mulch (1 June 2008). "Rise of the Andes". Science. 320 (5881): 1304–1307. Bibcode:2008Sci...320.1304G. doi:10.1126/SCIENCE.1148615. ISSN 0036-8075. PMID 18535236. S2CID 21288149. Wikidata Q55050032.
- Thure E. Cerling; John M. Harris; Bruce J. MacFadden; Meave G. Leakey; Jay Quade; Vera Eisenmann; James R. Ehleringer (September 1997). "Global vegetation change through the Miocene/Pliocene boundary". Nature. 389 (6647): 153–158. Bibcode:1997Natur.389..153C. doi:10.1038/38229. ISSN 1476-4687. Wikidata Q56603756.
- Alessandro Zanazzi; Matthew J Kohn; Bruce J MacFadden; Dennis O Terry (1 February 2007). "Large temperature drop across the Eocene-Oligocene transition in central North America". Nature. 445 (7128): 639–642. doi:10.1038/NATURE05551. ISSN 1476-4687. PMID 17287808. Wikidata Q31099135.
