= Conglomérat de Cernay =

Geologic formation in France

- Stratigraphic range: Thanetian; ~58–55 Ma
- Type: Formation

Lithology
- Primary: Conglomerate

Location
- Coordinates: 49.3°N 4.1°E
- Approximate paleocoordinates: 43.8°N 1.7°E
- Region: Champagne-Ardenne
- Country: France

Type section
- Named for: Cernay-lès-Reims
- Conglomérat de Cernay (France)

The Conglomérat de Cernay is a geologic formation in Champagne-Ardenne, northern France. It preserves fossils dating back to the Thanetian stage of the Paleocene period. The lizard Cernaycerta and placental mammal Bustylus cernaysi are named after the formation.

== Fossil content ==
The formation has provided fossils of:

=== Mammals ===
Primates

- Berruvius lasseroni
- Chiromyoides campanicus
- Plesiadapis remensis
- P. tricuspidens
- Sarnacius gingerichi

Acreodi

- Dissacus europaeus

Eutheria

- Landenodon lavocati

Macroscelidea

- Berrulestes pellouini
- B. phelizoni
- B. poirieri
- Dipavali petri
- Gigarton louisi
- G. meyeri
- G. sigogneauae
- Louisina marci
- L. mirabilis
- Thryptodon brailloni
- Walbeckodon girardi

Multituberculata

- Hainina godfriauxi
- H. vianeyae

Perissodactyls

- Paschatherium dolloi
- Phakodon levei
- Teilhardimys brisswalteri

Placentalia

- Bustylus cernaysi
- B. germanicus
- Remiculus deutschi
- Tricuspiodon rutimeyer
- T. sobrinus
- Afrodon sp.
- Tricuspiodon sp.

Theriiformes

- Adapisoriculidae indet.

=== Birds ===
- Berruornis orbisantiqui
- Eupterornis remensis
- Gastornis parisiensis
- Remiornis heberti

=== Reptiles ===
Crocodiles

- Diplocynodon remensis

Lizards

- Camptognathosaurus parisiensis
- Cernaycerta duchaussoisi
- Eolacerta sp.
- Necrosaurus sp.
- Amphisbaenidae indet.
- Glyptosaurinae indet.

Turtles

- Compsemys russelli
- Laurasichersis relicta
- Trionyx sp.
- Cryptodira indet.

=== Amphibians ===
- Palaeoproteus gallicus
- Koalliella sp.
- Palaeobatrachus sp.
- cf. Salamandra sp.
- Bufonidae indet.
- Neobatrachia indet.

== See also ==
- List of fossiliferous stratigraphic units in France
- Thanetian formations
  - Tuffeau de St Omer
  - Cerrejón Formation
  - Danata Formation
  - DeBeque Formation
  - Willwood Formation
