= Stevenscamelus =

Stevenscamelus Temporal range: late Eocene Chadronian

Scientific classification
- Kingdom: Animalia
- Phylum: Chordata
- Class: Mammalia
- Order: Artiodactyla
- Family: Camelidae
- Subfamily: †Floridatragulinae
- Genus: †Stevenscamelus; Prothero et al., 2023

Type species
- Poebrotherium franki Wilson, 1974

Extinct genus of floridatraguline camel

Stevenscamelus is an extinct genus of floridatraguline camel from the late Eocene of Texas. Fossil remains of the camel come from the Airstrip and Ash Spring local faunas of the Capote Mountain Tuff. The only species, S. franki, was originally described as a species of Poebrotherium, and was placed in its own genus in 2023. The genus is the oldest member of the Floridatraguline. During the late Eocene, the climate of Texas was humid and the paleoenvironment may be compared to some of the forests of Chiapas.

== History and naming ==
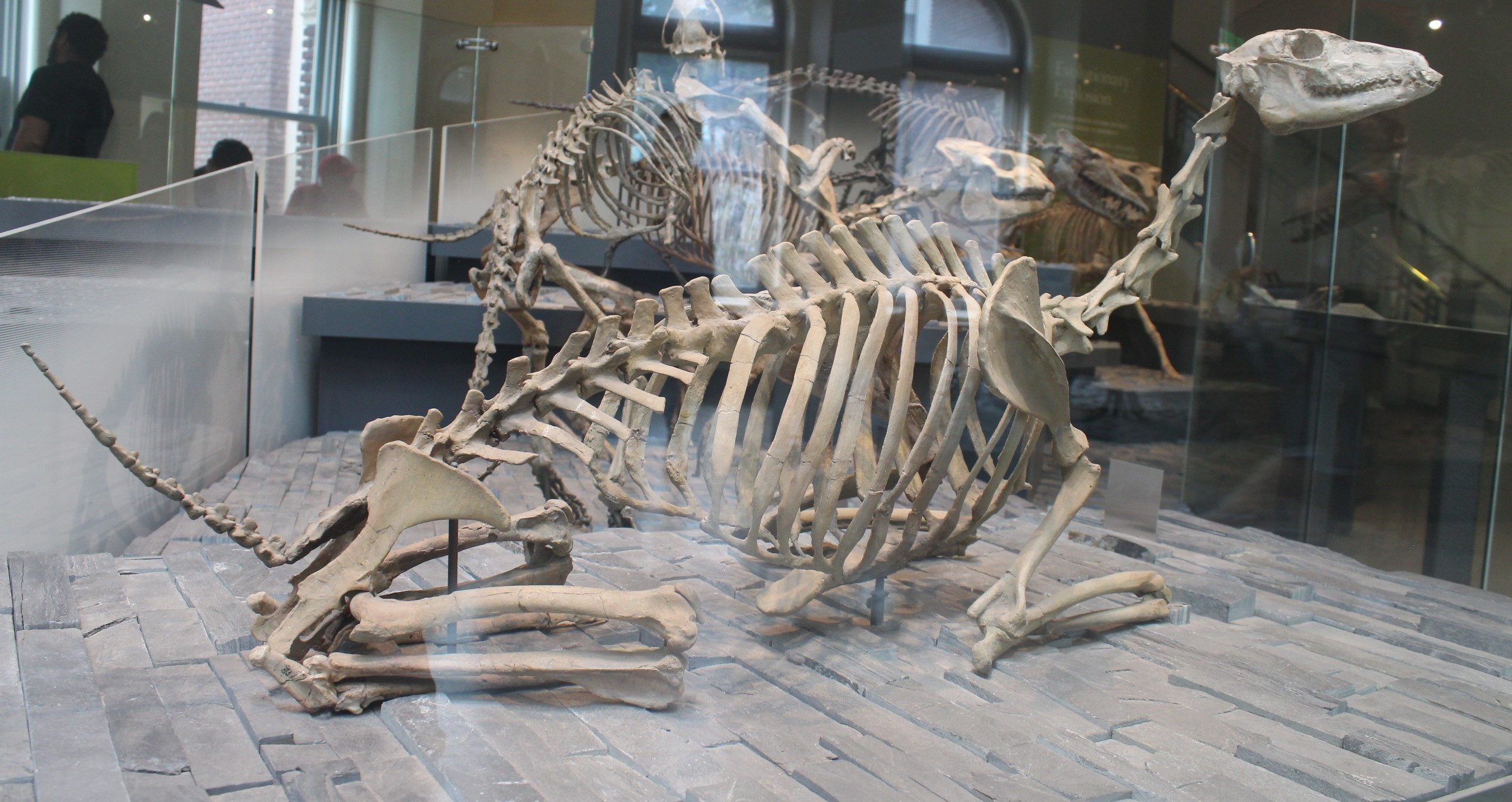
A skeletal mount of Poebrotherium, the genus that Stevenscamelus was originally assigned to

The first time that the material that was eventually assigned to Stevenscamelus was mentioned in the literature was in a description of various artiodactyls from the Vieja and Buck Hill Groups in Texas by John Andrew Wilson in 1974. In this original paper, the material was assigned to a new species of the early camelid genus Poebrotherium, being P. franki. This material assigned to the genus was found within the Airstrip and Ash Spring local faunas, with both of these local faunas being within the Capote Mountain Tuff of the Vieja Group. The holotype of the species (TxVP 40504-149) is made up of a relatively complete skull, a partial dentary, and fragmentary vertebrae found at the Airstrip local fauna. All other remains assigned to the taxon in this publication were incomplete cranial and dentary remains. Since the original publication, the assignment of P. franki to Poebrotherium was questioned with authors such as the Camelidae section of the Evolution of Tertiary Mammals of North America by James G. Honey and coauthors not only labeling the species as ?Poebrotherium franki but also labeling it as a potential member of Floridatragulinae. Though authors acknowledged that the species was not a true member of Poebrotherium throughout the 2000s and 2010s, it would not be moved into its own genus, Stevenscamelus, until a 2023 publication by Donald R. Prothero and coauthors. This reassignment of the species makes the taxon the oldest member of the subfamily.

The generic name of Stevenscamelus is in honor of Margaret Skeels Stevens, the first person to recognize the floridatraguline affinities of the taxon, along with someone who had a very large contribution to mammal paleontology. The specific name, franki, is also named after a person. This being R. M. Frank, a student assistant who helped with the collection and preparations of specimens collected from the Airstrip Local Fauna.

== Description ==
Stevenscamelus is a very small camel, having a complete upper dentition with a length of only 78.4 millimetres (3.09 in). Similar to other floridatragulines, the animal has a narrow, elongate rostrum along with a diastemata placed between the first and second upper premolars.

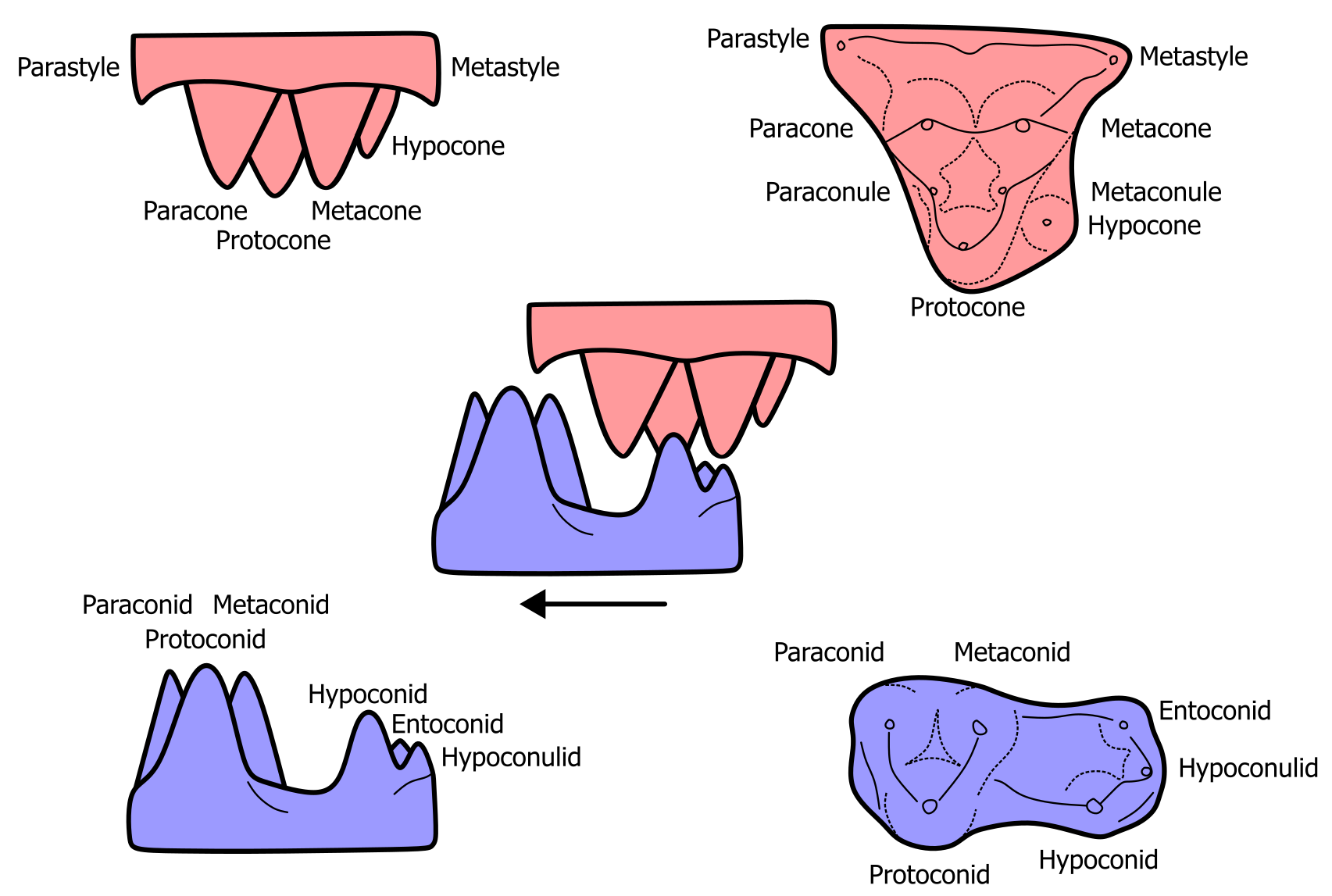
A diagram of tribosphenic molars showing the terminology of certain parts of the teeth

Based on the holotype and referred specimens of Stevenscamelus, the dental formula of the animal is 3,1,4,33,1,4,3 which is similar to other members of the subfamily. All three of the upper incisors (I^{1-3}) are about the same shape, being leaf-like. I^{1} differs from the others in its larger size along with the fact that the long axis of the tooth is perpendicular to the length of the rostrum rather than being in line with it. The upper canine (C) is very small, being around the same size as I^{2-3}. Upper premolars (P^{1-4}) of Stevenscamelus are all generally small, have high crowns, and have only a thin layer of enamel. P^{1-3} all have a more simple morphology, with a more blade-like shape. The most noticeable differences between the tooth crowns are that the paracone of P^{2} is larger and that P^{3} has a separate posterointernal cusp. Along with this, P^{1} is double-rooted and P^{3} is triple rooted. The upper molars (M^{1-3}) are brachydont with selenodont hypocones and more variable protocones. The protocones on M^{1-2} range from selenodont to bifurcate whereas it is more consistently selenodont in M^{3}. The incomplete mandible in the holotype shows that the lower jaw of the camel was very shallow. Similar to what was seen in the upper dentition, the lower premolars (p_{1-4}) are small and the only lower molar (m_{1}) is brachydont.

== Classification ==
Even before the reassignment in 2023, Stevenscamelus had been tentatively considered a member of Floridatragulinae since the 1998 chapter by Honey and coauthors. In the phylogeny included in this chapter of the book, what would later become Stevenscamelus was placed as the sister taxa to Floridatragulinae. A 2012 phylogeny by Aldo F. Rincon and coauthors countered this, instead consistently finding ?P. franki as the sister taxa to a specimen assigned to Poebrotherium sp. from Nebraska. As of 2023 the most recent phylogeny including Stevenscamelus is within a systematic review of Floridatragulinae by Prothero and coauthors which instead resulted in the genus being the outgroup to a clade containing Floridatragulus and Aguascalientia. The phylogenies from the 2012 and 2023 publications can be found below:

Rincon et al. (2013)

- - - Eotylopus reedi
    - - - Poebrotherium franki
        - Poebrotherium sp.
      - - Camelidae incerte sedis (specimens from the Buda Local Fauna)
        - - Aguascalientia panamaensis
          - - Aguascalientia minuta
            - - Aguascalientia wilsoni
              - - Floridatragulus dolicanthereus
                - - Floridatragulus texanus
                  - Floridatragulus nanus

Prothero et al. (2023)

- - - Poebrotherium
    - - Paratylopus
      - - - Stenomylini
          - Miotylopus
          - Psuedolabis
        - - - Stevenscamelus
            - - Floridatragulus
              - Aguascalientia
          - - Higher camels

== Paleoenvironment ==
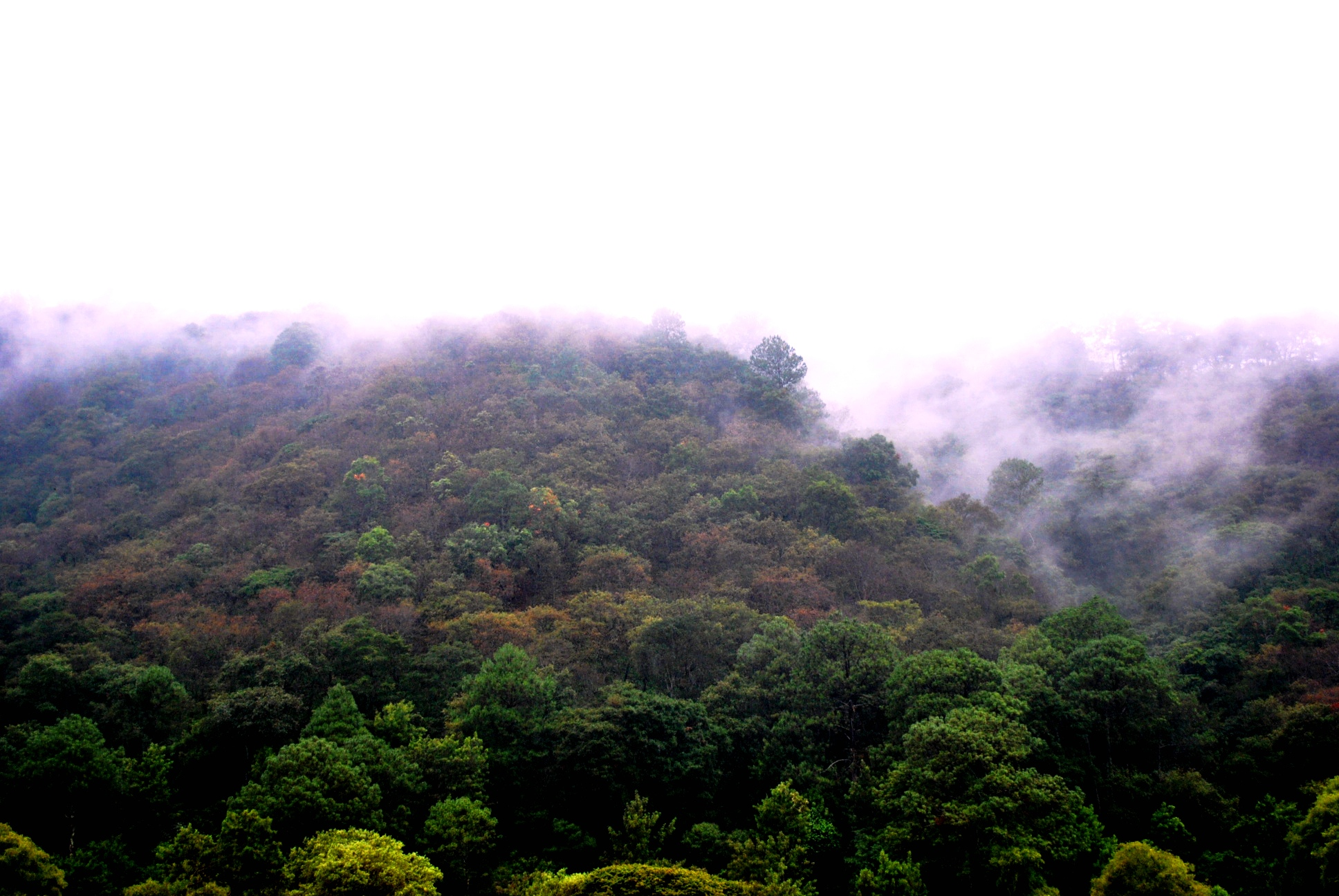
A Central American Pine-Oak forest in Chimaltenango, a proposed analog for the forests in Trans-Pecos Texas during the late Eocene

During the late Eocene, Trans-Pecos Texas was covered in a mix of dense forests most likely made up of pine, oak, and potentially sweetgum tree along with more open pine–oak forests. These forests would have been within a temperate climate with an estimated minimum of 123 centimetres (48 in) of precipitation annually. Though comparisons between this environment and those seen in the south-eastern United States today can be made, the 1984 publication by Barry Roth instead suggested comparisons with the temperature forests and montane rainforests in Chiapas. During this period of time, large amount of volcanic activity took place after the uplift and erosion of Late Cretaceous sediment.
