= Delores Robinson =

American geologist and tectonicist

Delores Marie Robinson
- Education: Guilford College; Vanderbilt University; University of Arizona
- Scientific career
- Workplaces: University of Alabama
- Thesis: Structural and neodymium-isotopic evidence for the tectonic evolution of the Himalayan fold-thrust belt, western Nepal and the northern Tibetan Plateau (2001)

Delores Marie Robinson is an American geologist and tectonicist who is a professor and department chair at the University of Alabama. Her research considers how orogenic systems evolve from porto-magmatic arcs, with a particular focus on Western Nepal, India, Bhutan and Southern Tibet.

== Early life and education ==
Robinson studied at the Guilford College, and graduated with a bachelor's degree in geology in 1994. She completed a research project on the gravity and magnetics of diabase dikes in Jamestown, North Carolina. She moved to Vanderbilt University for graduate studies, earning a master's degree in 1997. Her research involved the characterization of magma chamber dynamics in Aztec Wash pluton. Robinson became a doctoral student at the University of Arizona researching the kinematic history, structure and stratigraphy of Western Nepal. In 2001, Robinson was awarded a PhD. During Robinson's research in Western Nepal, she created a geological map.

== Research and career ==
Robinson started her professional career as a structural geologist at BP in Alaska. She was appointed to the faculty of the University of Alabama in 2003, and promoted to Professor and Chair of Geological Sciences in 2010. Her lithospheric scale and provenance studies research links structure, sedimentation, tectonics, and erosion through the use of field mapping, thermochronometers, geochronometers, and isotopes to reconstruct fold and thrust belts and theorize the evolution of mountain belts and orogenic systems. Her research has considered the tectonics of the Himalayas. In an effort to identify hidden hydrocarbons, Robinson collects and analyzes rocks and makes use of seismic data.

== Selected publications ==
- Peter G. DeCelles; Delores M. Robinson; Jay Quade; T. P. Ojha; Carmala N. Garzione; Peter Copeland; Bishal N. Upreti (August 2001). "Stratigraphy, structure, and tectonic evolution of the Himalayan fold-thrust belt in western Nepal". Tectonics. 20 (4): 487–509. Bibcode:2001Tecto..20..487D. doi:10.1029/2000tc001226. ISSN 0278-7407. Wikidata Q97323495.
- Peter G. DeCelles; Delores M. Robinson; George Zandt (December 2002). "Implications of shortening in the Himalayan fold-thrust belt for uplift of the Tibetan Plateau". Tectonics. 21 (6): 12-1 – 12-25. Bibcode:2002Tecto..21.1062D. doi:10.1029/2001tc001322. ISSN 0278-7407. Wikidata Q97323511.
- Delores M. Robinson; Peter G. DeCelles; P. Jonathan Patchett; Carmala N. Garzione (November 2001). "The kinematic evolution of the Nepalese Himalaya interpreted from Nd isotopes". Earth and Planetary Science Letters. 192 (4): 507–521. Bibcode:2001E&PSL.192..507R. doi:10.1016/s0012-821x(01)00451-4. ISSN 0012-821X. Wikidata Q104795803.

== Awards and honors ==
- 2018 Elected Fellow of the Geological Society of America

== Personal life ==
Robinson is married with four children.
