= Diane E. Pataki =

American academic

- Born: New York, NY
- Occupations: Director of the School of Sustainability, Arizona State University
- Parent(s): George and Eva Pataki

Academic background
- Education: B.A. Barnard College M.S. Nicholas School of the Environment, Duke University Ph.D. Nicholas School of the Environment, Duke University
- Thesis: Water use of co-occurring species in response to environmental conditions at varying temporal scales
- Doctoral advisor: Professor Ram Oren
- Other advisors: Dr. James Ehleringer, Dr. James Coleman

Academic work
- Discipline: Urban Ecology and Sustainability
- Institutions: Arizona State University University of Utah Utah State University University of California, Irvine
- Website: https://isearch.asu.edu/profile/2700377

Diane E. Pataki is a Foundation Professor and Director of the School of Sustainability at Arizona State University.

She is an elected Fellow of the American Geophysical Union, the Ecological Society of America, and the American Association for the Advancement of Science.

In 2008 she was a recipient of the James B. Macelwane Medal from the American Geophysical Union for her research on coupled water and carbon cycles. The award is given for “significant contributions to the geophysical sciences by an outstanding early career scientist.”

== Early life and education ==
Diane E. Pataki was born in New York City. She attended Jamaica High School and was included in the first group of students to participate in the Gateway to Higher Education (program) which started in 1986. The Gateway program allowed for students to receive extra exposure and mentorship in science and math. Pataki has cited this as what inspired her to pursue scientific research. Pataki took extra science, research and writing classes at the City University of New York.

Pataki graduated from Barnard College with a major in Environmental Science in 1993. During this time she worked as an intern at the headquarters of the Environmental Defense Fund assisting the executive director, Fred Krupp.

Pataki attended the Duke University Nicholas School of the Environment to pursue a M.S. and Ph.D. under Professor Ram Oren. Her dissertation is titled "Water use of co-occurring species in response to environmental conditions at varying temporal scales". Her two post-doctoral mentors were James Coleman at the Desert Research Institute and James Ehleringer at the University of Utah.

== Career and research ==
After her doctoral and post-doctoral research, Pataki in 2004 joined the faculty of the University of California, Irvine. While there, she was the founding Director of the Center for Environmental Biology and the Steele Burnard Anza Borrego Desert Research Center in 2011.

In 2012 Pataki moved to the University of Utah as an associate professor in the Department of Biology as well as adjunct faculty in the Department of City & Metropolitan Planning. From 2019 to 2021 she served as the Associate Vice President of Research at the University of Utah. From 2014 to 2015 she was a Program Director in the Division of Environmental Biology at the National Science Foundation. Pataki was also, until 2017, a member of the United States Environmental Protection Agency Board of Scientific Counselors.

Pataki's earlier research under Ram Oren while at Duke University focused on controls of canopy conductance in temperate forest species. She now specializes in land-atmosphere exchange, ecohydrology, biogeochemical cycles, and ecosystem services in urban environments. She has done extensive work on the use of carbon isotopes for source apportionment of urban carbon dioxide fluxes.

In 2015 Pataki participated in the Leopold Environmental Leadership Program. She currently serves on the NSF Advisory Committee on Environmental Research and Education.

== Service ==
- Vice President for Science, Ecological Society of America, 2019-
- Member of the National Science Foundation Directorate for Biological Sciences Advisory Committee 2017–2021
- Member of the National Science Foundation Advisory Committee on Environmental Research and Education 2018–present
- Program Director in the National Science Foundation Division of Environmental Biology 2014-2015
- Member of the United States Environmental Protection Agency Board of Scientific Counselors 2011-2017

=== Awards ===
- Fulbright Global Scholar, U.S. Fulbright Program
- 2021 Fellow of the American Association for the Advancement of Science
- 2019 Fellow of Ecological Society of America
- 2015 Fellow of the Leopold Leadership Program
- 2008 James B. Macelwane Medal, American Geophysical Union
- 2008 Fellow of the American Geophysical Union
- 1996 NASA Earth Science Summer School Fellowship
- 1993 Lillian Berle Dare Award. Barnard College, Columbia University
- 1993 Rice Prize in geology. Barnard College, Columbia University

== Selected publications ==
Diane E Pataki publications indexed by Google Scholar:

- Pataki, D.E. (2015). Grand challenges in urban ecology. Frontiers in Ecology and Evolution. Vol. 3, doi: 10.3389/fevo.2015.00057. Published, 06/2015. https://www.frontiersin.org/articles/10.3389/fevo.2015.00057/full
- Avolio ML, Pataki DE, Pincetl S, Gillespie TW, Jenerette GD, McCarthy HR. (2015). Understanding preferences for tree attributes: the relative effects of socio-economic and local environmental factors. Urban Ecosystems 18(1):73-86. Published, 03/2015.
- Pataki DE, Carreiro MM, Cherrier J, Grulke NE, Jenning V, Pincetl S, Pouyat RV, Whitlow TH, Zipperer WC. (2011). Coupling biogeochemical cycles in urban environments: Ecosystem services, green solutions, and misconceptions. Frontiers in Ecology and the Environment 9: 27–36. Published, 02/2011
- Pataki DE, Bowling DR, Ehleringer JR. (2003). Seasonal cycle of carbon dioxide and its isotopic composition in an urban atmosphere: anthropogenic and biogenic effects. JGR Atmospheres. 108(D23), 4735, doi:10.1029/2003JD003865. Published, 12/2003.
