= School of Sustainability =

School of Sustainability or School for Sustainability may refer to:

- Arizona State University School of Sustainability at Arizona State University
- School for Environment and Sustainability at the University of Michigan
- Stanford Doerr School of Sustainability at Stanford University
