= Carmala Garzione =

American geologist

- Alma mater: University of Maryland; University of Arizona
- Awards: Donath Medal (2007); William R. Dickinson Award (2020); Blavatnik Awards for Young Scientists (2009)
- Academic career
- Institutions: University of Rochester (2000–2019); Rochester Institute of Technology (2019–)
- Thesis: Tectonic and paleoelevation history of the Thakkhola Graben and implications for the evolution of the southern Tibetan Plateau
- Doctoral advisor: Peter G. DeCelles
- Doctoral students: Gregory D. Hoke, Alex Pullen, Junsheng Nie

Carmala Nina Garzione is an American geologist who is professor of geosciences and dean of the College of Science at the University of Arizona. Previously, she was associate provost for faculty affairs at the Rochester Institute of Technology, and prior to that she was a professor at the University of Rochester. She was awarded the 2009 Blavatnik Awards for Young Scientists.

== Early life and education ==
Garzione was an undergraduate student at the University of Maryland, College Park, where she majored in geology and was a member of Phi Beta Kappa. She was a graduate student in geosciences at the University of Arizona. Her doctoral research considered the Kali Gandaki Gorge and Graben, and how the tectonics impacted the evolution of the Tibetan plateau. As a graduate student she recognised the power of paleoaltimetry in the creation of geodynamics models.

== Research and career ==
Garzione joined the University of Rochester as an assistant professor in 2000, and was promoted to professor in 2013. Her research considered mountains and climate evolution. She focused on the Himalaya-Tibet region in the Himalayas and the Andes, mountain belts which impact global climate and geochemical budgets. To better understand tectonic processes such as surface uplift, Garzione measures the elevation of ancient mountain ranges, so-called palaeoaltimetry, as well as measurements of surface temperatures from ancient soils. She pioneered the use of stable isotope measurements. In general, these include measurements of δ_{18}O and δ_{2}H in rainfall, the values of which vary as elevation increases. Close to sea level, temperatures remain warm, whilst at higher elevations temperatures cool as the mountains rise. In general, heavier isotopes form stronger bonds. In low temperature elevated regions the atoms vibrate more slowly, and the bonds of heavy isotopes are more difficult to break, such that the concentration of Carbon-13 and Oxygen-18 are higher.

Garzione showed that the Altiplano plateau in the central Andes was formed by a series of rapid growth pulses, not through continual uplift. In terms of mountain growth, rapid means gaining at least one kilometre over several million years. She showed that portions of the dense lower and upper crust, which function as an anchor to the crust base, periodically detach and sink through the mantle. This process facilitates the uplift of the lower density upper crust, allowing it to rise rapidly. Garzione studied the role of carbon dioxide in the global cooling that occurred 3 million years ago.

In 2019 Garzione moved to the Rochester Institute of Technology as the Associate Provost for Faculty Affairs. In 2021, she returned to the University of Arizona as Dean of the College of Science.

== Awards and honors ==
- 2007 Geological Society of America Donath Medal
- 2008 Elected Fellow of the Geological Society of America
- 2009 Blavatnik Award for Young Scientists
- 2020 Society for Sedimentary Geology William R. Dickinson Medal

== Selected publications ==
- Garzione, Carmala N.; Hoke, Gregory D.; Libarkin, Julie C.; Withers, Saunia; MacFadden, Bruce; Eiler, John; Ghosh, Prosenjit; Mulch, Andreas (2008-06-06). "Rise of the Andes". Science. 320 (5881): 1304–1307. Bibcode:2008Sci...320.1304G. doi:10.1126/science.1148615. ISSN 0036-8075. PMID 18535236. S2CID 21288149.
- DeCelles, Peter G.; Robinson, Delores M.; Quade, Jay; Ojha, T. P.; Garzione, Carmala N.; Copeland, Peter; Upreti, Bishal N. (2001-08-01). "Stratigraphy, structure, and tectonic evolution of the Himalayan fold-thrust belt in western Nepal". Tectonics. 20 (4): 487–509. Bibcode:2001Tecto..20..487D. doi:10.1029/2000tc001226. ISSN 0278-7407.
- Garzione, Carmala N.; Molnar, Peter; Libarkin, Julie C.; MacFadden, Bruce J. (2006-01-31). "Rapid late Miocene rise of the Bolivian Altiplano: Evidence for removal of mantle lithosphere". Earth and Planetary Science Letters. 241 (3): 543–556. Bibcode:2006E&PSL.241..543G. doi:10.1016/j.epsl.2005.11.026. ISSN 0012-821X.
