= Tectonic (disambiguation) =

"Tectonic" means relating to or characteristic of the process of evolution of the Earth's crust.

It may also refer to:

- Tectonic (record label)

== See also ==
- Tecktonik (dance)
- Tectonics (journal)
