= Proremiculus =

Proremiculus Temporal range: Early Paleocene

Scientific classification
- Kingdom: Animalia
- Phylum: Chordata
- Class: Mammalia
- Family: †Adapisoriculidae
- Genus: †Proremiculus; De Bast, Sigé & Smith, 2012

Type species
- †Proremiculus lagnauxi De Bast, Sigé & Smith, 2012

Extinct family of mammals

Proremiculus is an extinct genus of adapisoriculid mammal known from the Paleocene of Belgium.

== Discovery ==
Proremiculus is known from the holotype IRSNB M2006 (R1-46), left second molar and from the paratypes IRSNB M2005 (Q2-44), left first molar, IRSNB M2007 (R1-38), right first molar, IRSNB M2008 (R1-74), left first or second molar, and the referred specimen N2-43, talonid of left first and second molars. All specimen were collected in the early Paleocene site of Hainin in Belgium.

== Etymology ==
Proremiculus was first named by Eric De Bast, Bernard Sigé and Thierry Smith in 2012 and the type species is Proremiculus lagnauxi. The generic name refers to its primitive molar morphology and the close relation to Remiculus. The specific name honors Hector Lagnaux.
