= Sahnitherium =

Sahnitherium Temporal range: Late Cretaceous, Maastrichtian

Scientific classification
- Kingdom: Animalia
- Phylum: Chordata
- Class: Mammalia
- Infraclass: Eutheria
- Superorder: ?Euarchontoglires
- (unranked): ?Euarchonta
- Family: ?Adapisoriculidae
- Genus: Sahnitherium Rana & Wilson, 2003

Species
- Sahnitherium rangapurensis Rana & Wilson, 2003 (type)

Genus of mammals

Sahnitherium is a possible basal Euarchontan from the Maastrichtian of the Intertrappean Beds of Andhra Pradesh, India. It may be closely related to Deccanolestes. The holotype is an upper molar, and it is the only specimen of Sahnitherium.
