= Stephanie Pincetl =

Stephanie Pincetl is an American academic specializing in the intersection of urban policy and the environment, particularly in California. She is the Director of the California Center for Sustainable Communities at UCLA in Los Angeles.

== Background and education ==
Pincetl earned a PhD in Urban Planning from UCLA. In addition to her academic career, she spent 10 years working for environmental justice in the nonprofit sector.

== Professional career ==
Pincetl is professor at the University of California Los Angeles Institute of the Environment. Her research focuses on environmental policy and politics. She frequently takes an interdisciplinary approach, and one of her contributions to the field is putting together teams of researchers from biophysical, engineering, and social sciences. This approach is designed to effectively analyze complex urban systems.

Pincetl focuses particularly on land use, the conditions for a 'just' energy transition and environmental issues in California. Her book, Transforming California, the Political History of Land Use and Development is one of the key sources on such policies in the state. She was Principal Investigator in a project analyzing the potential of Los Angeles' Million Trees Initiative for greening cities. She was the lead author of the urban section in the Southwest Technical Report to the National Climate Assessment, a national analysis required by congress. Beyond academics, she is the Faculty Director of the Los Angeles Regional Collaborative for Climate Action and Sustainability, a non-academic regional organization.

With Terri Hogue, Pincetl has analyzed water rights injustices in California, arguing that some early twentieth century laws need to be rewritten to ensure that all people can have reliable access to water. Her research with students has also provided new insight into how California water usage varies by income, finding that wealth is the most reliable predictor of water use.

In working with the California Energy Commission to understand energy use, Pincetl was one of the first academics to use the concept of urban metabolism outside the academy. First coined in 1965, the urban metabolism framework, which looks at all resources in and all waste out to understand a city's efficiency, is currently on the rise.

Pincetl developed the UCLA Energy Atlas (www.energyatlas.ucla.edu) which maps electricity and natural gas use across Southern California and the San Francisco Bay Area by sociodemographic characteristics, building vintage and size, and CalEnviro Screen, a metric that establishes environmental burden coupled to poverty. The Atlas back end is powered by billions of parcel level monthly electricity and natural gas use records, aggregated to display on the Atlas to protect customer privacy. Her Center has also developed a web based tool that can be used in Los Angeles County to determine where community solar can be installed, based on available roof space and grid capacity. Together with her team, she works to create knowledge that can be used to assist in a more just energy transition.

She also writes about environmental justice, habitat conservation, water, and energy policy in general. She contributed to the urban section in the National Climate Assessment.

Pincetl is committed to developing ideas and visions for how humans can live better together and with the planet in a post carbon future. This future will entail dramatic changes in daily life and in our habits, but can bring about beauty and joy, well being and health for all living beings. She believes that only through mutual thriving is there individual thriving.

=== Select major research ===
- Collaborative research with biophysical scientists on urban ecology and water management in Los Angeles, funded by the National Science Foundation
- Develop a methodology using urban metabolism methods and analysis of social policy for understanding energy use in California communities, funded by the California Energy Commission PIER program
- Analysis of the potential of Los Angeles' Million Trees Initiative for greening cities, funded by the EPA
- Contributor to urban section and Southwest Technical Report in the National Climate Assessment

=== Select publications ===
- The Myth of Sustainable Cities: Losing the Holocene (Routledge, 2026)
- Transforming California: A Political History of Land Use and Development (Johns Hopkins University Press, 1999)
- Pincetl, S. 2010. "Implementing Municipal Tree Planting: Los Angeles Million Tree Initiative." Environmental Management.
- Pincetl, Stephanie. 2010. "From the Sanitary City to the Sustainable City: Challenges to Institutionalising Biogenic (nature's services) Infrastructure." Local Environment.
- Schwarz, Kirsten; Fragkias, Michail; Boone, Christopher G.; Zhou, Weiqi; McHale, Melissa; Grove, J. Morgan; O'Neil-Dunne, Jarlath; McFadden, Joseph P.; Buckley, Geoffrey L.; Childers, Dan; Ogden, Laura; Pincetl, Stephanie; Pataki, Diane; Whitmer, Ali; Cadenasso, Mary L.; Loiselle, Steven Arthur. 2015. "Trees Grow on Money: Urban Tree Canopy Cover and Environmental Justice." PLOS ONE.
- Pataki, Diane; Carreiro, Margaret; Cherrier, Jennifer; Grulke, Nancy; Jennings, Viniece; Pincetl, Stephanie; Pouyat, Richard; Whitlow, Thomas; Zipperer, Wayne. 2011. "Coupling Biogeochemical Cycles in Urban Environments: Ecosystemservices, Green Solutions, and Misconceptions." Frontiers in Ecology and the Environment.
- Park, Mi-Hyun; Stenstrom, Michael; Pincetl, Stephanie. 2009. "Water Quality Improvement Policies: Lessons Learned from the Implementation of Proposition O in Los Angeles, California." Environmental Management.
