= Miophocaena =

Miophocaena Temporal range: Late Miocene 6.4–5.5 Ma

Scientific classification
- Kingdom: Animalia
- Phylum: Chordata
- Class: Mammalia
- Order: Artiodactyla
- Infraorder: Cetacea
- Family: Phocoenidae
- Genus: †Miophocaena; Murakami, Shimada, Hikida, and Hirano, 2012
- Species: †M. nishinoi

Binomial name
- †Miophocaena nishinoi Murakami, Shimada, Hikida, and Hirano, 2012

Extinct genus of porpoises

Miophocaena nishinoi is an extinct species of porpoise from the Late Miocene Koetoi Formation of Japan, dating to around 6.4–5.5 million years ago (mya), represented by a partial skull. the genus name derives from Ancient Greek mio for the Miocene, and phocaena for "porpoise"; the species name honors the discoverer, Takanobu Nishino. Miophocaena resides in a clade with Archaeophocaena discovered in the same area, and, along with Pterophocaena, represents an intermediate phase between porpoises and dolphins.
