= Archaeophocaena =

Archaeophocaena Temporal range: Late Miocene 6.4–5.5 Ma

Scientific classification
- Kingdom: Animalia
- Phylum: Chordata
- Class: Mammalia
- Order: Artiodactyla
- Infraorder: Cetacea
- Family: Phocoenidae
- Genus: †Archaeophocaena; Murakami, Shimada, Hikida, and Hirano, 2012
- Species: †A. teshioensis

Binomial name
- †Archaeophocaena teshioensis Murakami, Shimada, Hikida, and Hirano, 2012

Extinct genus of porpoises

Archaeophocaena teshioensis is a species of extinct porpoise from the Late Miocene Koetoi Formation of Japan living around 6.4–5.5 million years ago (mya). The holotype specimen comprises a partial skull. The animal, along with Miophocaena and Pterophocaena, seem to represent an intermediary phase between porpoises and dolphins. The genus name derives from Ancient Greek archaeo, "ancient," and Latin phocaena, "porpoise"; the species name honors the Teshio District where the holotype was discovered.
