= Longirostrotylopus =

Longirostrotylopus Temporal range: Oligocene–Early Miocene (Ar2–He1 [NALMA])

Scientific classification
- Kingdom: Animalia
- Phylum: Chordata
- Class: Mammalia
- Order: Artiodactyla
- Family: Camelidae
- Subfamily: †Floridatragulinae
- Genus: †Longirostrotylopus; Prothero et al., 2026
- Species: †L. holroydae

Binomial name
- †Longirostrotylopus holroydae Prothero et al., 2026

Synonyms
- Longirostromeryx Prothero et al., 2026 (lapsus calami)

Genus of extinct camelid

Longirostrotylopus is an extinct genus of camelid artiodactyl in the subfamily Floridatragulinae. The genus contains a single species, Longirostrotylopus holroydae, known from a nearly complete skull and mandible, along with various nonassociated cranial and postcranial remains from different localities. It is known from the John Day Formation of Oregon, United States, which is assigned to the early Arikareean to early Hemingfordian North American land mammal ages (NALMAs), which are correlated to the Oligocene–early Miocene epochs. It is the first floridatraguline named from Oregon, extending the clade's range beyond the more southerly states and Panama, where it was previously thought to be restricted to.
