= Myotis korotkevichae =

Myotis korotkevichae Temporal range: Late Miocene

Scientific classification
- Kingdom: Animalia
- Phylum: Chordata
- Class: Mammalia
- Order: Chiroptera
- Family: Vespertilionidae
- Genus: Myotis
- Species: †M. korotkevichae

Binomial name
- †Myotis korotkevichae Rosina & Semenov, 2012

Extinct species of bat

Myotis korotkevichae is an extinct species of Myotis that lived during the Late Miocene.

== Distribution ==
Myotis korotkevichae is known from Ukraine.
