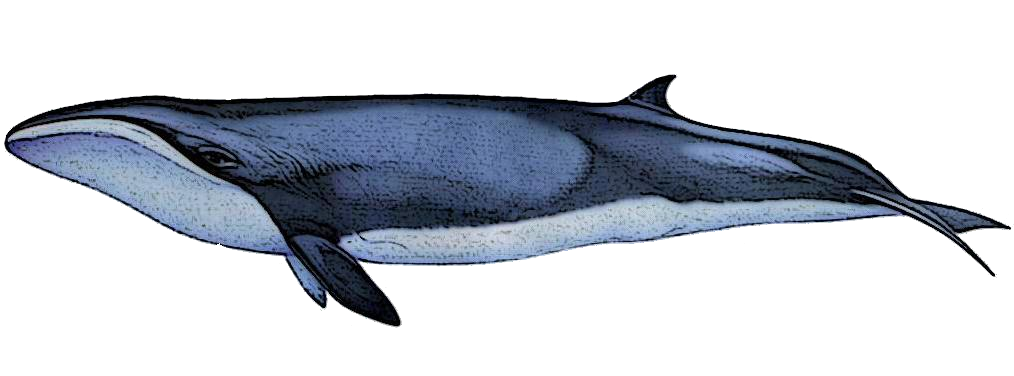
- Pygmy right whale Caperea marginata

Scientific classification
- Kingdom: Animalia
- Phylum: Chordata
- Class: Mammalia
- Order: Artiodactyla
- Infraorder: Cetacea
- Parvorder: Mysticeti
- Family: Neobalaenidae; Miller, 1923

Genera
- Caperea Gray 1873; †Miocaperea Bisconti 2012

= Neobalaenidae =

Neobalaenidae Temporal range: Tortonian–Recent

Obsolete family of mammals

Neobalaenidae is a defunct family of baleen whales (suborder Mysticeti) including the extant pygmy right whale. Although traditionally considered related to balaenids, recent studies by Fordyce and Marx (2013) and Ludovic Dutoit and colleagues (2023) have recovered the living pygmy right whale as a member of Cetotheriidae, making it the only extant cetotheriid. Not all authors agree with this placement.

== Taxonomy ==
The family Neobalaenidae was long restricted to the pygmy right whale from the Southern Hemisphere due to the unusual skeletal form of the species relative to other extant mysticetes. Until the early 2010s Neobalaenidae was unknown from the fossil record despite a study by Sasaki et al. (2005) placing the divergence date of Neobalaenidae from other living baleen whales at 23 mya.

Fordyce and Marx found that the pygmy right whale formed a well-supported clade with Eschrichtiidae and Balaenopteridae based on molecular data, and that, within 'cetotheres', it was most closely related to the herpetocetines (Herpetocetus and Nannocetus), rendering the pygmy right whale the only living species of Cetotheriidae. Around the same time, Bisconti had described the first pygmy right whale from the fossil record, Miocaperea, from the Pisco Formation of Peru. Bisconti, however, found, based on morphological data, it to be more closely related to Balaenidae (the bowhead and right whales), but added that additional specimens are expected to resolve these conflicting results within a few years. Cladistic analyses by Gol'din and Steeman partly agreed with Fordyce and Marx in recovering neobalaenids as closer to cetotheres than to Balaenidae, but disagreed with their recovery of the pygmy right whale as a herpetocetine, instead recovering Neobalaenidae outside Cetotheriidae.

== Fossil record ==
Examples of Neobalaenidae in the fossil record include Miocaperea, a couple of indeterminate earbones from Australia (one similar to Caperea), and specimens from Pleistocene localities in the Northern Hemisphere.
