= Terri Hogue =

American hydrologist

- Education: University of Wisconsin–Eau Claire (B.S.), University of Arizona (M.S., Ph.D.)
- Awards: CAREER Award
- Scientific career
- Fields: Hydrology, Environmental Engineering, Water Resource Management
- Workplaces: Colorado School of Mines
- Website: http://inside.mines.edu/THOGUE-home

Terri S. Hogue is an American hydrologist. She is currently a professor and department head of Civil and Environmental Engineering at Colorado School of Mines. Her research focuses on different hydrologic and land surface processes in semi-arid regions and the implications of them on water resource management.

== Early life and education ==
Hogue attended University of Wisconsin–Eau Claire, where she graduated in 1995 with a B.S. in Geology. She then earned her Masters in 1998 and her Ph.D. in 2003 from University of Arizona in Hydrology and Water Resources.

== Career ==
In July 2003, Hogue started as an assistant professor in the Department of Civil and Environmental Engineering at University of California–Los Angeles. She was on faculty there for eight years and became an associate professor in 2009. Hogue continues to be an adjunct associate professor for the university as well. When she left UCLA, Hogue joined the faculty at Colorado School of Mines in the Civil and Environmental Engineering program. She was later named the Department Head of Civil and Environmental Engineering in January 2018. In this position, Hogue hopes to increase national visibility and recognition for her department. Prior to this appointment, Hogue was the Director of the Hydrologic Science and Engineering graduate program at Colorado School of Mines. Additionally, Hogue serves as the director of the ConocoPhillips Center for Sustainable WE^{2}ST at Colorado School of Mines, which is the home of research on sustainability in energy and water resources on the campus. Hogue also was a member of the Colorado School of Mines Board of Trustees from January 2017 until January 2019.

=== Research ===
Hogue is best known for her research on fluxes in the hydrologic cycle. Specifically, Hogue studies how anthropogenic changes to the environment and natural hazards affect hydrologic and land surface processes. Much of her research then looks toward the development of tools and models to better predict such hydrologic fluxes. At Colorado School of Mines, Hogue leads a research group focusing on these areas of study, with an emphasis on modeling and parameterization for different watershed responses to a variety of events. For example, Hogue looks at the effects of wildfire on catchments, the implications of urbanization on hydrologic activity, and flood forecasting. In recent years, Hogue received grants from the National Science Foundation and United States Environmental Protection Agency to continue her research in these fields with a focus on water sustainability and stormwater treatment. Regarding research on policy, Hogue also completed multiple studies on the impacts of different water management methods in urban areas such as Los Angeles.

== Awards and honors ==
Hogue has been recognized for her work in many forms. Notably, in 2009, she received the National Science Foundation’s CAREER Award. In 2011, Hogue spoke at the United States Senate "Hazards on the Hill" event about fire and urbanization. She has also been the Hydrology Section Secretary for the American Geophysical Union since 2013.

In 2015, the National Science Foundation also granted Hogue and her colleague at Colorado School of Mines $600,000 to start a Research Experience for Teachers at Colorado School of Mines, exemplifying Hogue's work in public outreach.
