= Julie Libarkin =

American geophysicist

- Education: University of Arizona (PhD); Michigan State University
- Scientific career
- Workplaces: Michigan State University; Center for Astrophysics | Harvard & Smithsonian
- Thesis: Geophysical applications in compressional orogens (1999)

Julie Carol Libarkin is an American geophysicist. She is professor of Earth Sciences and Director of the Geocognition Laboratory at Michigan State University. Her research considers how people understand and make decisions about the planet. She is a Fellow of the Geological Society of America. She also researches and addresses inequality in academia, and tracks academic sexual misconduct cases.

== Early life and education ==
Libarkin studied physics and geology at the College of William & Mary and graduated in 1994. She moved to the University of Arizona for her graduate studies, where she studied palaeomagnetism and cosmogenic isotopes. Upon graduation, Libarkin switched her focus to tectonic and geocognition.

== Research and career ==
Libarkin was appointed a National Science Foundation Postdoctoral Fellow in the Center for Astrophysics | Harvard & Smithsonian. She was made a Research Associate in 2002. In 2003 Libarkin was appointed Assistant Professor at Ohio University. She moved to Michigan State University in 2006, where she was made Director of Educational Research in 2011. She was promoted to Professor in 2016, where she Directs the Georecognition Research Laboratory. She investigates how people see and understand the Earth, and how this impacts the decisions they make.

=== Academic service ===
Libarkin is involved with research and mentoring to tackle inequality in academia. She has created a database of reported sexual misconduct cases. As of 2020, the database includes over 1,000 cases – all of which included substantiated reports, institutional findings and legal outcomes. Libarkin has investigated sexual harassment in the physics undergraduate community. She serves on the National Academies of Sciences, Engineering, and Medicine Action Collaborative on Preventing Sexual Harassment in Higher Education. She has called for job applicants to be required to disclose whether they have had formal or informal findings of misconduct against them.

Libarkin has been involved with the transformation of science education, including creating a mechanism to better understand the interactions of science and policy. She serves as a member of the Create for STEM initiative.

== Awards and honours ==
- 2008 Michigan State University Lorena V. Blinn Endowed Teaching Award
- 2014 Michigan State University Global Innovation Fellow
- 2015 Elected Fellow of the Geological Society of America
- 2017 Geological Society of America Top Geoscience Paper of the Year
- 2018 Association of Women Geoscientists Exchange Award
- 2019 Commission on the Status of Women Top Paper in the Open Category

== Selected publications ==
- Libarkin, Julie C.; Anderson, Steven W. (September 2005). "Assessment of Learning in Entry-Level Geoscience Courses: Results from the Geoscience Concept Inventory". Journal of Geoscience Education. 53 (4): 394–401. Bibcode:2005JGeEd..53..394L. doi:10.5408/1089-9995-53.4.394. ISSN 1089-9995. S2CID 1562537.
- Garzione, Carmala N.; Molnar, Peter; Libarkin, Julie C.; MacFadden, Bruce J. (July 2007). "Reply to Comment on "Rapid late Miocene rise of the Bolivian Altiplano: Evidence for removal of mantle lithosphere" by Garzione et al. (2006), Earth Planet. Sci. Lett. 241 (2006) 543–556". Earth and Planetary Science Letters. 259 (3–4): 630–633. Bibcode:2007E&PSL.259..630G. doi:10.1016/j.epsl.2007.04.054. ISSN 0012-821X.
- Libarkin, Julie C.; Kurdziel, Josepha P.; Anderson, Steven W. (November 2007). "College Student Conceptions of Geological Time and the Disconnect Between Ordering and Scale". Journal of Geoscience Education. 55 (5): 413–422. Bibcode:2007JGeEd..55..413L. doi:10.5408/1089-9995-55.5.413. ISSN 1089-9995. S2CID 33685790.

Libarkin has served as Editor-in-Chief of the Journal of Geoscience Education.
