= Auroremys =

Auroremys Temporal range: Middle Eocene

Scientific classification
- Kingdom: Animalia
- Phylum: Chordata
- Class: Mammalia
- Order: Rodentia
- Family: †Pseudosciuridae
- Genus: †Auroremys; Vianey-Liaud & Marivaux, 2021
- Species: †A. subita

Binomial name
- †Auroremys subita Comte et al., 2012

Extinct genus of rodents

Auroremys is an extinct genus of Palaeogene rodents belonging to the theridomorph family Pseudosciuridae. The type and only species Auroremys subita was first named by Bernard Comte et al. in 2012 as belonging to the ischyromyid genus Ailuravus before it was eventually reclassified to its own genus by French palaeontologists Monique Vianey-Liaud and Laurent Marivaux in 2021.

Several other rodent genera are recorded from the type locality of Chéry-Chartreuve along with Auroremys such as the glirid Glamys and theridomyoids (Protadelomys, Tardenomys, and Elfomys).
