= Plecotus schoepfelii =

Plecotus schoepfelii Temporal range: Early Miocene

Scientific classification
- Domain: Eukaryota
- Kingdom: Animalia
- Phylum: Chordata
- Class: Mammalia
- Order: Chiroptera
- Family: Vespertilionidae
- Genus: Plecotus
- Species: P. schoepfelii

Binomial name
- Plecotus schoepfelii Rosina & Rummel, 2012

Plecotus schoepfelii is an extinct species of Plecotus that lived during the Miocene epoch.

== Distribution ==
Fossils of P. schoepfelii are known from the Early Miocene site of Petersbuch in Bavaria.
