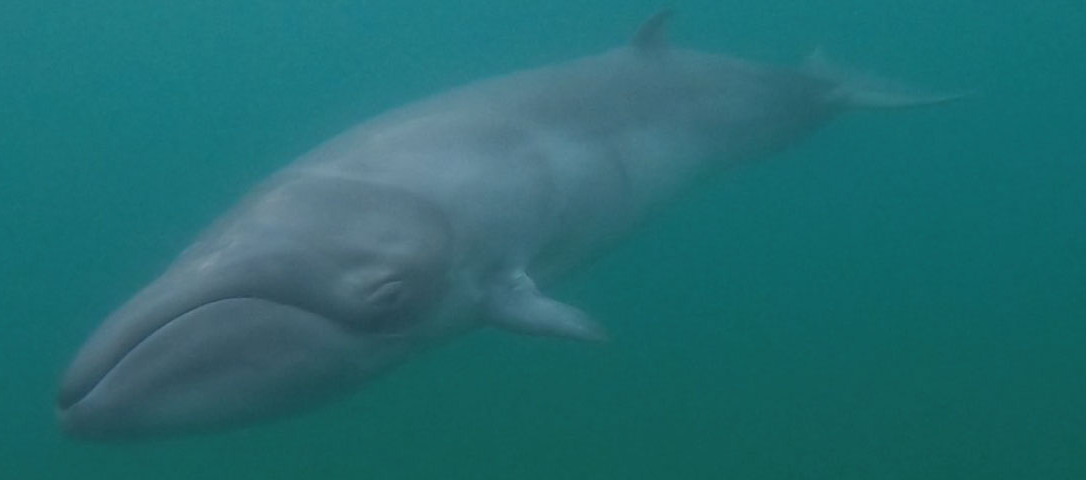
- Pygmy right whale off the coast of southern Australia
- Size compared to an average human

Conservation status
- Least Concern (IUCN 3.1)
- CITES Appendix I

Scientific classification
- Kingdom: Animalia
- Phylum: Chordata
- Class: Mammalia
- Infraclass: Placentalia
- Order: Artiodactyla
- Infraorder: Cetacea
- Family: Cetotheriidae
- Subfamily: Neobalaeninae (Gray, 1873)
- Genus: Caperea; Gray, 1864
- Species: C. marginata

Binomial name
- Caperea marginata (Gray, 1846)
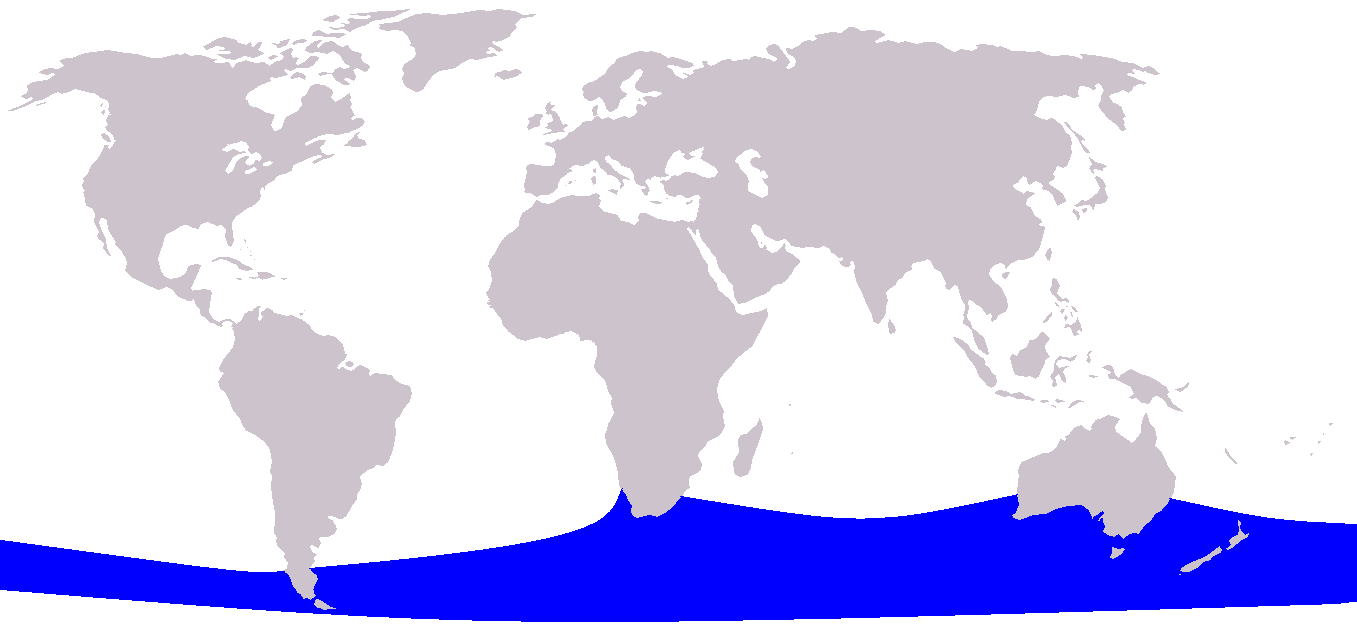
- Pygmy right whale range

= Pygmy right whale =

Pygmy right whale Temporal range: 6.2–0 Ma Late Miocene – Recent

Species of mammal

The pygmy right whale (Caperea marginata) is a species of baleen whale. It may be a member of the cetotheres, a family of baleen whales which until 2012 were thought to be extinct; C. marginata has otherwise been considered the sole member of the family Neobalaenidae and is the only member of the genus Caperea. First described by John Edward Gray in 1846, it is the smallest of the baleen whales, ranging between 6 and 6.5 metres (20 and 21 ft) in length and 3,000 and 3,500 kilograms (6,610 and 7,720 lb) in mass. Despite its name, the pygmy right whale may have more in common with the gray whale and rorquals than the bowhead and right whales.

The pygmy right whale is found in temperate waters of the Southern Hemisphere, and feeds on copepods and euphausiids. Little is known about its population or social habits. Unlike most other baleen whales, it has rarely been subject to exploitation.

== Taxonomy ==
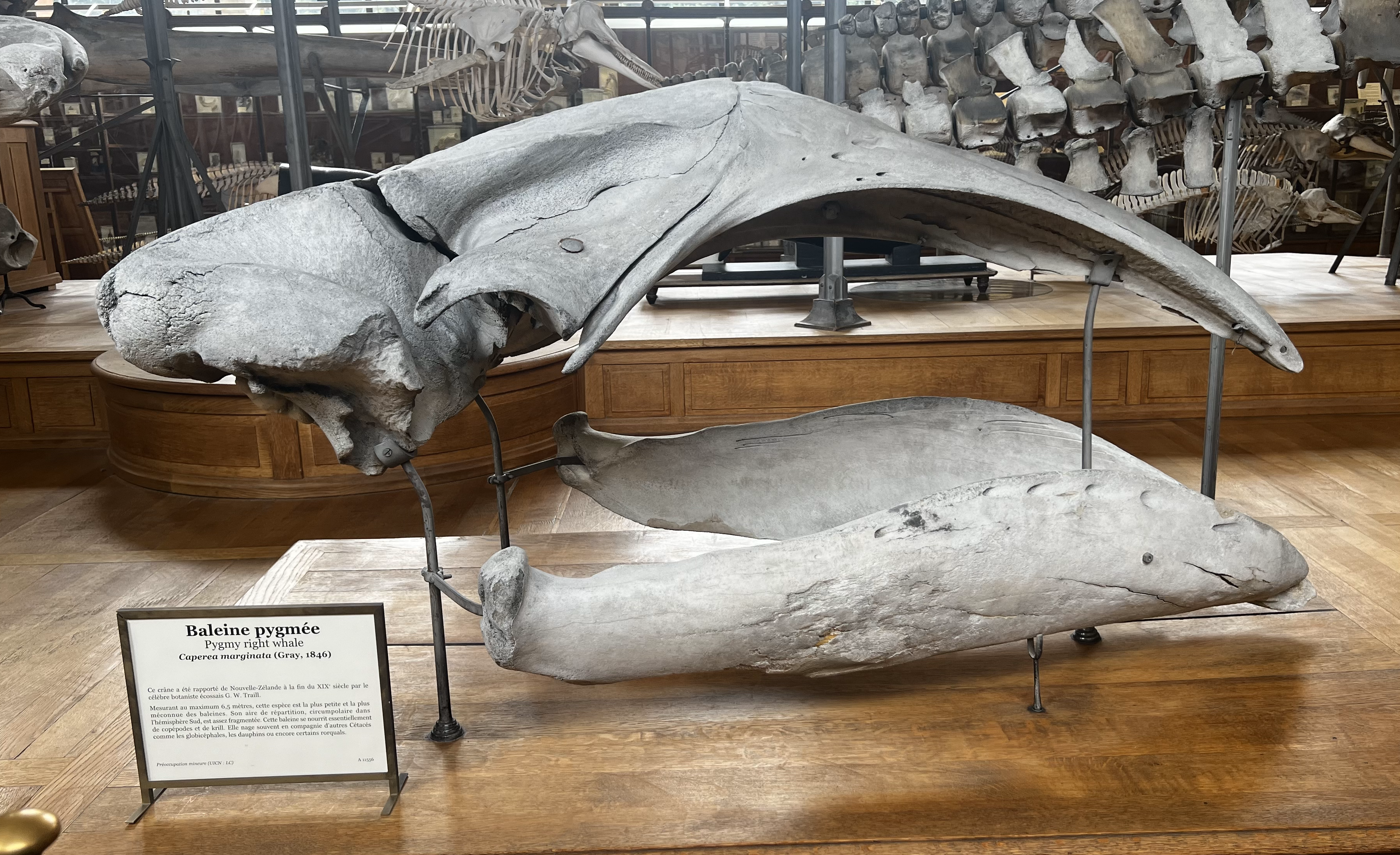
Skull at the National Museum of Natural History, France

During the 1839-45 voyage of James Clark Ross, naturalists found bones and baleen plates resembling a smaller version of the right whale. In his Zoology of the Voyage of HMS Erebus and Terror (1846), John Edward Gray described the new species, naming it Balaena marginata. In 1864, Gray established a new genus (Caperea) after receiving a skull and some bones of another specimen. Six years later, in 1870, he added the name Neobalaena. He soon realized the three species were one and the same: Caperea marginata (caperea means "wrinkle" in Latin, "referring to the wrinkled appearance of the ear bone"; while marginata translates to "enclosed with a border", which "refers to the dark border around the baleen plates of some individuals"). In research findings published on 18 December 2012, paleontologist Felix Marx compared the skull bones of pygmy right whales to those of extinct cetaceans, finding it to be a close relative to the Cetotheriidae, making the pygmy right whale a living fossil. A 2023 study using genomic DNA confirmed that pygmy right whales are more closely related to rorquals than to balaenid right whales, consistent with a close relationship with the cetotheres.

In 2012, Italian palaeontologist Michelangelo Bisconti described Miocaperea pulchra, a first fossil pygmy right whale from Peru. This new genus differs from the living genus in some cranial details, but Bisconti's study confirmed the monophyly of the Neobalaenidae and he concluded that the rorqual-like features in C. marginata must be the result of parallel evolution. The presence of a fossil neobalaenid some 2,000 km (1,200 mi) north of the known range of C. marginata, suggests that environmental change has caused a southern shift in neobalaenid distribution. A second, undescribed species was tentatively assigned to Neobalaenidae in 2012. A fossil from the Messinian age (Late Miocene) about 6.2 to 5.4 million years ago has been identified as Caperea sp. in 2018.

== Description ==
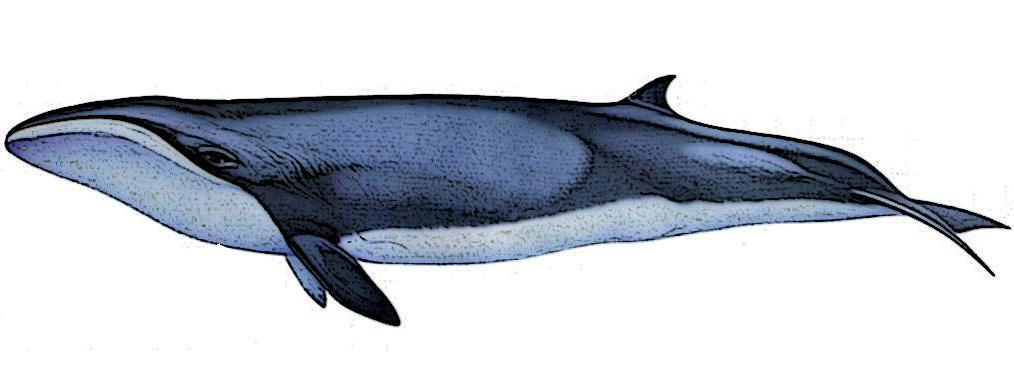
Artist's impression of a pygmy right whale

The pygmy right whale is rarely encountered and consequently little studied. However, it is known that it is by far the smallest of the baleen whales. Calves are estimated to be about 1.6 metres (5 ft 3 in) to 2.2 metres (7 ft 3 in) at birth (an approximately 2 metres (6 ft 7 in) fetus was reported from a 6 metres (20 ft) female that had stranded in Perkins Bay, Tasmania, in 1982). Calves may be weaned when they reach 5 months old. By the time they are weaned, they may be about 3 to 3.5 metres (9.8 to 11.5 ft) long. It is believed they become sexually mature at about 5 metres (16 ft) and physically mature at about 6 metres (20 ft). The longest male registered, was a 6.1 metres (20 ft) individual which had stranded in Cloudy Bay, Tasmania, while the longest female was a 6.45–6.5 metres (21.2–21.3 ft) individual which had stranded in Stanley, Tasmania in 1981. Pygmy right whales can weigh as much as 3,430 kilograms (7,560 lb). A 6.21 metres (20.4 ft) female weighed 3,200 kilograms (7,100 lb) and a 5.47 metres (17.9 ft) male weighed 2,850 kilograms (6,280 lb). Gestation and lactation periods and longevity are all unknown. Part of the reason for the scarcity of data may be the relative inactivity of the whale, making location for study difficult. The blow is small and indistinct and the whale is usually a slow undulating swimmer, although capable of bursts of acceleration.

The coloring and shape of the pygmy right whale, dark gray dorsally and lighter gray ventrally, commonly with a pair of chevron-shaped lighter patches behind the eyes, is similar to that of the dwarf minke and Antarctic minke whales and at sea the species may easily be confused with these two species, in case the jaw and flippers are not carefully observed. The arched jawline is not as pronounced as other right whales and may not be sufficient to distinguish a pygmy right whale from a minke whale. The long, narrow cream-coloured baleen plates with a distinctive white gumline are the most effective discriminators. Unlike true right whales, pygmy rights do not have callosities. The dorsal fin is falcate (crescent-shaped) and located about three-quarters of the way along the back of the animal. Unlike the minke whales, occasionally the dorsal will not be seen on the whale surfacing. Like the minkes, though, it doesn't raise its flukes when it dives.

The skull and skeleton of the pygmy right whale is unlike those of any other extant whale: the supraoccipital shield extends farther posteriorly; the ear bone has a lateral wrinkle and is roughly square in outline. All seven cervical vertebrae are fused, and the pygmy right has only 44 vertebrae. The 18 pairs of ribs are broad and flat, and make up 39–45% of the vertebral column (compared to 33% in other mysticetes). Each thoracic vertebrae has a pair of huge wing-like transverse processes, many of which overlap. The dorsal end of the ribs are remarkably thin and almost fail to make contact with the transverse processes. The reduced tail (or sacrocaudal region) features a vestigial pelvis and small chevron bones. The flippers have four digits. The lungs and heart are relatively small, which suggests that the pygmy right whale is not a deep diver. The larynx is reported to be different from any other cetacean.

Like other mysticetes, the pygmy right whale has a large laryngeal sac, but in contrast to other mysticetes, this sac is positioned on the right side of the midline in the pygmy right. The presence of this laryngeal sac can possibly be the explanation for the long thorax and flattened ribs, but the peculiar ribs have led to multiple speculations as to their origin.

== Behavior and ecology ==
Analysis of the stomach contents of dead pygmy right whales indicates that it feeds on copepods and euphausiids (krill). The social and mating structures are unknown. The whale is typically seen alone or in pairs, sometimes associated with other cetaceans (including dolphins, pilot whales, minke whales, and once a sei whale cow and calf). Occasionally larger groups are seen — in 2001 a group of 14 were seen at 46°S in the South Pacific about 450 km southeast of New Zealand, while in 1992 a group of about 80 individuals were seen 320 nautical miles (590 km) southwest of Cape Leeuwin and another group of over 100 individuals were sighted in June 2007 about 40 kilometres (25 mi) southwest of Portland, Victoria. The maximum swimming speed of pygmy right whales has been estimated at 6–8 knots (11–15 km/h; 6.9–9.2 mph).

The flukes, blubber, and baleen plates of a pygmy right whale calf were found in a 7.47 m (24.5 ft) killer whale caught by whalers off South Africa.

== Population and distribution ==
The pygmy right whale is among the least-studied cetaceans; until 2008, fewer than 25 sightings of the species had been made at sea. The total global population is unknown. This small, elusive whale lives solely in the Southern Hemisphere, where it is believed to be circumpolar, living in a band from about 30°S to 55°S (in areas with surface water temperatures between 5 and 20 °C (41 and 68 °F). Individuals have been beached or washed-up on the coasts of Chile, Tierra del Fuego, Namibia, South Africa, Australia and New Zealand. At least one group may be year-round residents off Tasmania.

In Namibia, several instances of pygmy right whales being found beached (possibly due to tidal fluctuations) and successfully helped back out to sea have occurred, including in 2010 in Walvis Bay and in 2014 near Lüderitz; in these instances, the whales were effectively cared for and analyzed before eventually being repositioned and guided by boat back to the open water.

There is an extralimital stranding record in the Northern Hemisphere.

== Whaling and whale-watching ==
On account of its relatively small size and sparse distribution, the pygmy right whale has rarely been taken by whalers. A 3.39 metres (11.1 ft) male was taken off South Africa in 1917, and a couple were caught for scientific purposes by Soviet whalers in the South Atlantic in 1970. Also a few pygmy right whales are known to have been caught in fishing nets. These factors are not believed to have had a significant impact on the population.

Most data about pygmy right whales come from individual specimens washed up on coastlines; they are rarely encountered at sea and so they are not the primary subject of any whale watching cruises.

== Conservation ==
The pygmy right whale is listed on Appendix II of the Convention on the Conservation of Migratory Species of Wild Animals (CMS). It is listed on Appendix II, as it has an unfavourable conservation status or would benefit significantly from international co-operation organised by tailored agreements.

The pygmy right whale is also covered by Memorandum of Understanding for the Conservation of Cetaceans and Their Habitats in the Pacific Islands Region (Pacific Cetaceans MOU).

== See also ==
- List of cetaceans
