= Turkanamys =

Turkanamys Temporal range: Late Oligocene

Scientific classification
- Kingdom: Animalia
- Phylum: Chordata
- Class: Mammalia
- Infraclass: Placentalia
- Order: Rodentia
- Parvorder: Phiomorpha
- Genus: †Turkanamys; Marivaux et al., 2012
- Species: †T. hexalophus

Binomial name
- †Turkanamys hexalophus Marivaux et al., 2012

Extinct genus of phiomorph rodent

Turkanamys is an extinct monotypic genus of phiomorph rodent that lived in East Africa during the Chattian stage of the Oligocene epoch.

== Description ==
Turkanamys had hexalophodont maxillary molars, a highly autapomorphic feature, although much of the rest of its pattern of dental morphology was similar to more basal hystricognaths.
