= Floridatragulinae =

Floridatragulinae Temporal range: 35–13.6 Ma Late Eocene – Middle Miocene

Scientific classification
- Kingdom: Animalia
- Phylum: Chordata
- Class: Mammalia
- Order: Artiodactyla
- Family: Camelidae
- Subfamily: †Floridatragulinae; Maglio, 1966

Type genus
- †Floridatragulus

Genera
- †Aguascalientia; †Floridatragulus; †Longirostrotylopus; †Stevenscamelus

Extinct subfamily of camelids

Floridatragulinae is an extinct subfamily of Camelidae that were endemic to North America, ranging from the Late Eocene to the Middle Miocene. Members of this group differ from other camelids by their elongated snouts, where there is a significant diastema between the canine and first premolar tooth. Their teeth were blade-like, suggesting they were browsers. The floridatragulines include the genera Aguascalientia, Floridatragulus, Longirostrotylopus, and Stevenscamelus, and as a whole were closer in relation to the group leading up to the extant camelids.
