= Miocaperea =

Miocaperea Temporal range: Late Miocene ~11.608–7.246 Ma

Scientific classification
- Kingdom: Animalia
- Phylum: Chordata
- Class: Mammalia
- Order: Artiodactyla
- Infraorder: Cetacea
- Family: Cetotheriidae
- Subfamily: Neobalaeninae
- Genus: †Miocaperea; Bisconti, 2012

Species
- †M. pulchra Bisconti, 2012 (type)

Extinct genus of mammals

Miocaperea is an extinct genus of pygmy right whale from the Late Miocene Pisco Formation of Peru. Its type species is Miocaperea pulchra.

== Evolution and significance ==
The discovery of Miocaperea is significant, because neobalaenines were previously unknown in the fossil record, except for an isolated petrosal (ear bone) from late Miocene-aged deposits in Australia. A previous study placed the divergence date of Neobalaeninae from other mysticetes at about 23 million years, and the age of Miocaperea lends credence to the notion of an origin for Neobalaeninae deep in the early Miocene.
