= Neophiomys =

Neophiomys Temporal range: Early Oligocene

Scientific classification
- Kingdom: Animalia
- Phylum: Chordata
- Class: Mammalia
- Order: Rodentia
- Family: Thryonomyidae
- Genus: †Neophiomys; Coster et al., 2012

Type species
- Neophiomys paraphiomyoides Wood, 1968

Other species
- Neophiomys dawsonae Coster et al., 2015; Neophiomys minutus Marivaux et al., 2017

Extinct genus of thryonomyid rodent

Neophiomys is an extinct genus of thryonomyid rodent that lived in Africa during the Rupelian stage of the Oligocene epoch.

== Distribution ==
Neophiomys minutus is known only from the Samlat Formation of Morocco. Neophiomys paraphiomyoides lived in both Egypt and Libya, while Neophiomys dawsonae is known exclusively from Libya.
