= Gazella harmonae =

Gazella harmonae Temporal range: 3.1–1.9 Ma

Scientific classification
- Domain: Eukaryota
- Kingdom: Animalia
- Phylum: Chordata
- Class: Mammalia
- Order: Artiodactyla
- Family: Bovidae
- Subfamily: Antilopinae
- Tribe: Antilopini
- Genus: Gazella
- Species: †G. harmonae

Binomial name
- †Gazella harmonae Geraads et al., 2012

Extinct species of mammal

Gazella harmonae is an extinct gazelle which existed in what is now Ethiopia during the Pliocene epoch. It was described by Denis Geraads, René Bobe and Kaye Reed in 2012. Approximately the size of a living dorcas gazelle, the animal was noted for its unusual, spiral horn cores.
