= Sulaimanius =

Sulaimanius Temporal range: Late Early Eocene

Scientific classification
- Domain: Eukaryota
- Kingdom: Animalia
- Phylum: Chordata
- Class: Mammalia
- Order: Primates
- Suborder: Strepsirrhini
- Family: †incertae sedis
- Genus: †Sulaimanius; Gunnell et al., 2012
- Species: †S. arifi

Binomial name
- †Sulaimanius arifi Gunnell et al., 2008

Genus of adapiform primate

Sulaimanius is a genus of adapiform primate that lived in Asia during the late early Eocene. The genus was originally named Sulaimania, but was renamed in 2012 by the original authors to use the masculine form, Sulaimanius, to avoid a conflict with a genus of spider.
