= Aguascalientia panamaensis =

Aguascalientia panamaensis Temporal range: Miocene

Scientific classification
- Kingdom: Animalia
- Phylum: Chordata
- Class: Mammalia
- Order: Artiodactyla
- Family: Camelidae
- Genus: †Aguascalientia
- Species: †A. panamaensis

Binomial name
- †Aguascalientia panamaensis Rincon et al. 2012

Extinct species of mammal

Aguascalientia panamaensis is an extinct species of miniature camels found in Panama first described by Aldo F. Rincon et al. in 2012.

== Taxonomy ==
Aguascalientia was named by Rincon et al. (2012).
