= Pardinamys =

Pardinamys Temporal range: Piacenzian

Scientific classification
- Kingdom: Animalia
- Phylum: Chordata
- Class: Mammalia
- Infraclass: Placentalia
- Order: Rodentia
- Family: Cricetidae
- Subfamily: Sigmodontinae
- Genus: †Pardinamys; Ortiz et al., 2012
- Species: †P. humahuaquensis

Binomial name
- †Pardinamys humahuaquensis Ortiz et al., 2012

Extinct genus of sigmodontine rodent

Pardinamys is an extinct monotypic genus of phyllotin rodent that lived in South America during the Piacenzian stage of the Pliocene epoch.

== Etymology ==
The generic name Pardinamys honours the Argentine zoologist Ulyses Francisco Jose Pardiñas for his contributions to the study of both fossil and recent sigmodontine rodents. The specific epithet of the type species, Pardinamys humahuaquensis, references Quebrada de Humahuaca, a UNESCO World Heritage Site in the area where the holotype fossil was discovered.
