= Thure E. Cerling =

American geochemist (born 1949)

- Known for: Modern animal diet and physiology Geological record of ecological change
- Awards: Fellow, National Academy of Sciences (2001); Penrose Medal (2025)
- Scientific career
- Fields: Geology; Geophysics; Geochemistry; Biology

Thure Edward Cerling (born 1949) is a Distinguished Professor of Geology and Geophysics and a Distinguished Professor of Biology at the University of Utah. Cerling is a leading expert in the evolution of modern landscapes including modern mammals and their associated grassland ecologies and stable isotope analyses of the atmosphere. Cerling lives in Salt Lake City, Utah.

"A single hair can determine a person's location during the past weeks or even years" – Thure E. Cerling

Cerling's research interests are primarily focused on Earth surface geochemistry processes and on the geological record of ecological change. Particularly, working on conservation biology, Cerling has analyzed the modern animal diet and physiology by using stable isotopes as natural tracers as well as studying dietary changes of different mammalian lineages extending over millions of years.

Emphasizing continental ecologies of lakes and modern soils and ecosystems, Cerling has written extensievely about the evolution of ecosystems, the inception and strengthening of monsoons, and the atmosphere over geological time scales through evidence gathered about the fractionation of stable isotopes in these systems.

Current research work includes a focus on the development of landforms in semi-arid regions, the geology of Old World paleo-anthropologic sites and on contaminant migration in surface and ground waters, including the use of tritium and helium as hydrological tracers.

Together with James Ehleringer, he established the Stable Isotope Biogeochemistry and Ecology (IsoCamp) summer course at the University of Utah, which "trains students in the fundamental environmental and biological theory underlying isotope fractionation processes across a broad spectrum of ecological and environmental applications".

== Early life ==
Thure E. Cerling received his Bachelor of Science degree in geology and chemistry from Iowa State University, in Ames, Iowa, in 1972, and, in 1973, his Master of Science in geology from Iowa State. In 1977 he was awarded a Ph.D. in geology from the University of California at Berkeley. From 1977 to 1979 he worked as a research scientist at Oak Ridge National Laboratory and, from 1979 he has been a member of the University of Utah's faculty.

== Global ecological changes ==
With the publication of "Expansion of C_{4} ecosystems as an indicator of global ecological change in the late Miocene" in 1993, Cerling, helped by Yang Wang and Jay Quade, made relevant studies relatively to carbon isotopes. Thanks to a deep analysis of palaeovegetation from palaeosols and palaeodiet measured in fossil tooth enamel, was demonstrated a global increase in the biomass of plants using C_{4} photosynthesis between 7 and 5 million years ago. The decrease of atmospheric CO_{2} concentrations over the history below a threshold that favored the C_{3}-photosynthesizing plants was considered as a valid reason for the global expansion of C_{4} biomass. The publication "Global vegetation change through the Miocene/Pliocene boundary" in 1997 confirmed these results, demonstrating even how at lower latitudes the change appeared to occur earlier because of the threshold for C_{3} photosynthesis is higher at warmer temperatures.

== Give me a hair and I'll tell you where you have been ==
Thure Cerling and James Ehleringer, a biology professor at the University of Utah, founded Isoforensics in 2003, a company with the aim of interpreting the stable isotope composition of various biological and synthetic materials. This was the first step for the discovery they made which was first published on February 25, 2008, by the "Proceedings of the National Academy of Sciences" with the title "Hydrogen and oxygen isotope ratios in human hair are related to geography". To know where people have been and where they lived for a while are information that became available by analyzing the stable isotope composition of their scalp hair. Cerling discovered that a strand of hair could provide valuable clues about a person's travels by studying the variation of hydrogen-2 (δ^{2}H) and oxygen-18 (δ18O) isotopes and comparing them to the ones in the drinking water. The extent of the information that can be deduced depends on the length of the hair: the longer is the hair, the greater is the extraction of information. The variation with geography of isotope concentrations is linked with precipitations, cloud temperatures and with the amount of water that evaporates from soil and plants. When clouds move off the ocean towards inland the ratios of oxygen-18 to oxygen-16 and hydrogen-2 to hydrogen-1 tend to decrease because of the rain water with oxygen-18 and hydrogen-2, being heavier, tends to fall first. Samples of tap water were collected from more than 600 cities across the United States as well as hair samples from the barbershops in 65 cities in 20 states. The comparison showed that both hair and drinking water samples had the same isotopic variations. In order to display these information, the scientists produced color-coded maps based on the correlation of the isotopes in hair to those in drinking water. This maps show how ratios of hydrogen and oxygen isotopes in scalp hair vary in different areas of the United States. It was so proved that the water drunk by a human being leaves in the hair an oxygen and hydrogen isotope signature equal to that in the tap water.

== The elephant tail hair ==
Cerling, helped by James Ehleringer and Christopher Remien (two University of Utah colleagues), George Wittemyer of Colorado State University and member of "Save the Elephants" in Nairobi, and Iain Douglas-Hamilton, who founded the association "Save the Elephants", conducted a research around the Samburu and Buffalo Springs national reserves in northern Kenya analyzing carbon and other stable isotopes in elephant tail hair to discover where and what Victoria, Anastasia and Cleopatra, three daughters of a mother elephant named Queen Elizabeth, usually eat over a six-years period (2000–2006). In order to monitor their life, the elephants were equipped with a Global Positioning System that recorded their positions every hour for the whole research period. For getting the sample of tail hair, elephants were immobilized with drug-filled dart guns when necessary. Considering that the hair grows about an inch per month, a single hair contained isotopic information to diet during an 18-month period.

The analysis of ratios of carbon-13 to carbon-12 along the length of a single elephant hair led Cerling and his crew to understand the elephants' diet. During the wet season, after the grass had grown long enough for elephants to grab with their trunks, their tail hair showed the presence of different form of carbon, indicating a high amount of high-protein grass. On the other hand, during the dry season, the results obtained by the analysis of the hair pointed out how elephants had switched over to shrubs and trees. All these analyses pointed out even that there are some elephant families friendlier than others and showed how there are dominant families that settle down in the best places, where there is plenty of food and water.

== Recognition ==
In 2025, Cerling was awarded the Penrose Medal of the Geological Society of America, which is the senior medal of the society. The award was in recognition of Cerling's pioneering use of soil carbonates for paleoclimate reconstruction.

== Selected publications ==
- Cerling, T. E.; Wang, Y.; Quade, J. (1993). "Expansion of C_{4} ecosystems as an indicator of global ecological change in the late Miocene" (PDF). Nature. 361 (6410): 344. Bibcode:1993Natur.361..344C. doi:10.1038/361344a0. S2CID 4345173.
- Cerling, T. E.; Harris, J. M.; MacFadden, B. J.; Leakey, M. G.; Quade, J.; Eisenmann, V.; Ehleringer, J. R. (1997). "Global vegetation change through the Miocene/Pliocene boundary" (PDF). Nature. 389 (6647): 153. Bibcode:1997Natur.389..153C. doi:10.1038/38229. S2CID 4400133.
- Ehleringer, J. R.; Bowen, G. J.; Chesson, L. A.; West, A. G.; Podlesak, D. W.; Cerling, T. E. (2008). "Hydrogen and oxygen isotope ratios in human hair are related to geography". Proceedings of the National Academy of Sciences. 105 (8): 2788–93. Bibcode:2008PNAS..105.2788E. doi:10.1073/pnas.0712228105. PMC 2268538. PMID 18299562.
- Cerling, T. E.; Harris, J. M.; Leakey, M. G. (1999). "Browsing and Grazing in Elephants: The Isotope Record of Modern and Fossil Proboscideans" (PDF). Oecologia. 120 (3): 364–374. Bibcode:1999Oecol.120..364C. doi:10.1007/s004420050869. PMID 28308013. S2CID 22605087.
- Thure Cerling; Iain Douglas-Hamilton; Lee Siegel: "Elephant Tracks" University of Utah News Release, January 2, 2006.
