= Arizona State University School of Sustainability =

Part of Arizona State University

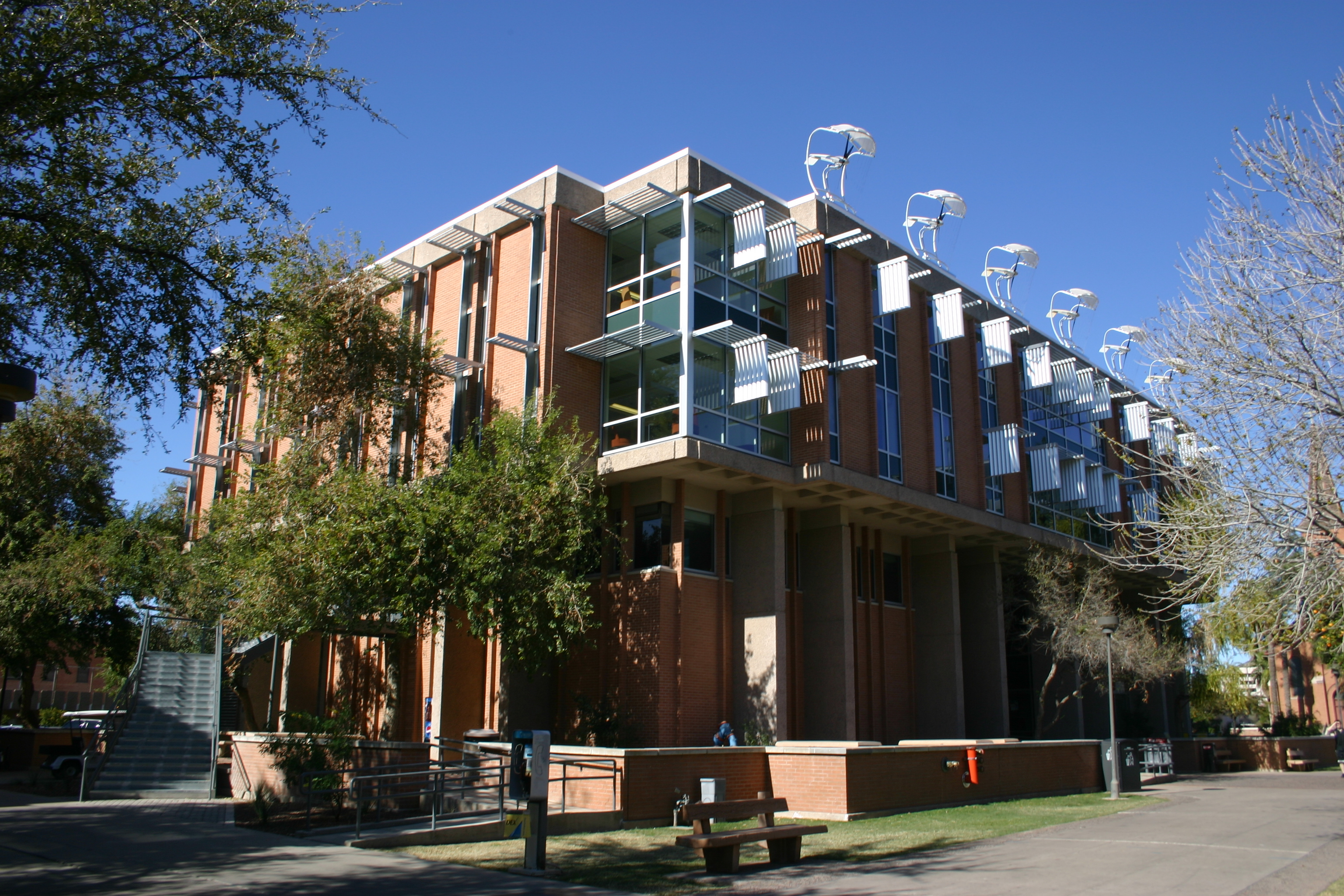
- Wrigley Hall with wind turbines on the roof
- Type: Public
- Established: 2006
- Director: Diane E. Pataki
- Location: Tempe, Arizona, U.S. 33°25′17″N 111°56′07″W
- Campus: Urban
- Website: schoolofsustainability.asu.edu

The Arizona State University School of Sustainability is the first school in the United States dedicated to exploring the principles of sustainability. The school was established in 2006 at Arizona State University. The School offers a BA and BS in Sustainability, a BS in Sustainable Food Systems, a Master of Sustainability Solutions, Master of Sustainability Leadership, Executive Master of Sustainability Leadership, MS in Sustainable Food Systems, MA, MS, and PhD in Sustainability, and PhD in Sustainable Energy. It is located within the Global Futures Laboratory at the Arizona State University Tempe campus. In Fall 2016, the School of Sustainability expanded its BA and BS degree offerings to the Arizona State University Polytechnic campus located in Mesa, Arizona.

As of May 2016, 947 students have graduated with degrees in Sustainability at ASU. Of those, 758 graduated with a bachelor's degree, 190 with a master's degree, and 42 with a PhD. In fall 2021, approximately 1,100 students were enrolled in sustainability programs at the School of Sustainability.

The School of Sustainability works with other colleges at Arizona State University to offer a Minor in Sustainability, a BA in business with a Sustainability concentration, a Bachelor of Interdisciplinary Studies with a Sustainability concentration, a Bachelor of Science in Public Service and Public Policy with a Sustainability concentration, a BS in Tourism Development and Management with a Sustainability Tourism concentration, and a Bachelor of Sustainability Engineering. The Bachelor of Arts in Sustainability, the Minor in Sustainability, the Master of Sustainability Leadership, the BA in Business and Sustainability, and the Bachelor of Interdisciplinary Studies with a Sustainability Concentration may be taken through ASU Online, Arizona State University's online college.

== Faculty ==
The School of Sustainability has 60 appointed faculty. ASU President Michael M. Crow is a member of the graduate faculty. The appointed faculty includes two members of the National Academy of Sciences, Professor Michael Hanemann and Professor B.L. Turner II. Students may also take classes and seek advising from 400 Global Futures Scientists and Scholars drawn from across all campuses and all colleges of Arizona State University.

== History ==
The Arizona Board of Regents approved the establishment of the School of Sustainability in 2006. In January 2007, the School of Sustainability accepted its first graduate students into the program. Dr. Charles Redman was the founding Director of the school as well as the Global Institute of Sustainability. In fall 2008, the first undergraduates enrolled in the school's degree programs. In 2010, the university-wide Minor in Sustainability was launched and Dr. Sander van der Leeuw became the new Dean of the school. In fall 2013, the school launched a new Master's of Sustainable Solutions degree, an applied program without a thesis requirement. The Minor in Sustainability was first offered through ASU Online in fall 2013. In July 2013, Dr. Christopher Boone became the Interim Dean. In October 2014 he was appointed as Dean. The Executive Master's for Sustainability Leadership accepted its first cohort of students in January 2014. In June 2014, Starbucks and Arizona State University announced a partnership whereby Starbucks will cover part or all of the tuition costs of its employees to complete degrees though ASU Online, which include three programs in sustainability. In April, 2015, the ASU-Starbucks College Achievement plan was expanded from two years to four years of support for a bachelor's degree. In fall 2015, two new fully online degrees were launched: the BA in Sustainability and the Master of Sustainability Leadership. Beginning in fall 2016, the BS in Sustainability was offered fully online.

In 2015, ASU was ranked 11th in the Sierra Magazine's 2015 Rankings of America's Greenest Colleges and Universities, also known as the "Cool Schools" ranking. In September 2016, it jumped to 6th in the "Cool Schools" rankings.

In 2019, the School of Sustainability became part of the College of Global Futures in the ASU Global Futures Laboratory. Dr. Diane E. Pataki was appointed as the School Director in 2021.

== See also ==
- ASU Campus Metabolism
