= Floridatragulus =

Floridatragulus Temporal range: Early Miocene–Middle Miocene

Scientific classification
- Domain: Eukaryota
- Kingdom: Animalia
- Phylum: Chordata
- Class: Mammalia
- Order: Artiodactyla
- Family: Camelidae
- Subfamily: †Floridatragulinae
- Genus: †Floridatragulus; White 1940

Type species
- †Floridatragulus dolichanthereus

Species
- F. dolichanthereus White 1940; F. hesperus Patton 1969; F. nanus Patton 1969; F. texanus Patton 1969

Synonyms
- Hypermekops

Extinct genus of mammals

Floridatragulus is an extinct genus of camelids. It lived in North America during the Early to Middle Miocene, about 20.6—15.9 mya, existing for approximately 5 million years.
