= Afrodon =

Afrodon Temporal range: Danian-Ypresian (Cernaysian-Grauvian) ~66–48.6 Ma

Scientific classification
- Domain: Eukaryota
- Kingdom: Animalia
- Phylum: Chordata
- Class: Mammalia
- Family: †Adapisoriculidae
- Genus: †Afrodon; Gheerbrant, 1988

Type species
- Afrodon chleuhi

Species
- A. chleuhi Gheerbrant, 1988; A. germanicus (Russell, 1964); A. tagourtensis Gheerbrant, 1993; A. ivani Lopez-Martinez & Pelaez-Campomanes, 1999; A. gheerbranti De Bast, Sigé & Smith, 2012

Extinct genus of mammals

Afrodon is an extinct genus of eutherians in the family Adapisoriculidae. Its type species is Afrodon chleuhi, known from the late Palaeocene of Morocco. The other known species are Afrodon germanicus from the late Palaeocene of Germany and France, Afrodon tagourtensis from the early Eocene of Morocco, Afrodon ivani from the late Palaeocene of Spain, and Afrodon gheerbranti from the early Paleocene of Belgium. Its range spread from the Cernaysian to the Grauvian in the European land mammal ages.

== Distribution ==
Fossils of Afrodon have been found in:

Paleocene

- Hainin Formation, Belgium
- Cernay Formation, France
- Tremp Formation, Spain
- Jbel Guersif Formation, Morocco

Eocene

- Aït Ouarhitane Formation, Morocco
