= James Ehleringer =

American ecologist

James Ehleringer is an American biologist and Distinguished Professor of at the University of Utah. He is an elected member of the US National Academy of Sciences, a Fellow of the American Geophysical Union, Ecological Society of America, and American Association for Advancement of Science. He is an ISI Highly Cited researcher. Together with Thure E. Cerling, he established the Stable Isotope Biogeochemistry and Ecology (IsoCamp) summer course at the University of Utah, which "trains students in the fundamental environmental and biological theory underlying isotope fractionation processes across a broad spectrum of ecological and environmental applications".
