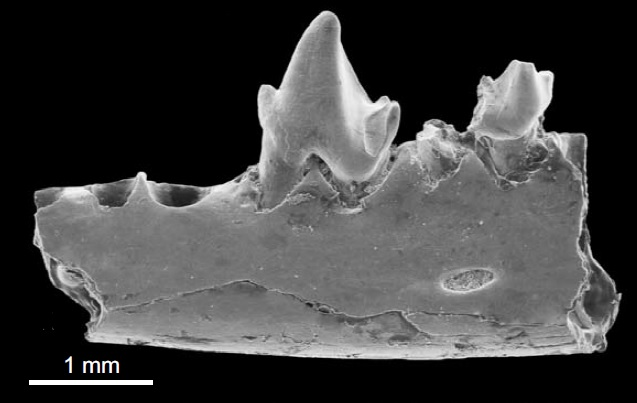
- Lower jaw fragment of B. marandati

Scientific classification
- Kingdom: Animalia
- Phylum: Chordata
- Class: Mammalia
- Family: †Adapisoriculidae
- Genus: †Bustylus; Gheerbrandt & Russell, 1991

Species
- B. cernaysi; B. folieae; B. marandati

= Bustylus =

Bustylus Temporal range: Paleocene

Extinct genus of mammals

Bustylus is an extinct genus of eutherians in the family Adapisoriculidae. It was described by Emmanuel Gheerbrandt and Russell in 1991, and the type species is B. cernaysi, described from the late Paleocene of Cernay, France (from which the species epithet was derived), and possibly also from Germany. Gheerbrandt later redescribed the species Peradectes marandati (Crochet and Sigé, 1983) as a species of Bustylus. A third species, B. folieae, was described from the early Paleocene of Belgium by Eric De Bast, Bernard Sigé and Thierry Smith in 2012. B. folieae was named in honour of Dr. Annelise Folie.

== Species ==
- Bustylus cernaysi Gheerbrandt & Russell, 1991
- Bustylus marandati (Crochet & Sigé, 1983)
- Bustylus folieae De Bast et al., 2012
