= Tectonics (journal) =

- Language: English
- Edited by: John Geissman, Laurent Jolivet, Nathan Niemi, Taylor Schildgen

Publication details
- History: 1982-present
- Publisher: American Geophysical Union
- Frequency: Monthly
- Impact factor: 3.58 (2017)

Standard abbreviations
- ISO 4: Tectonics

Indexing
- ISSN: 0278-7407 (print); 1944-9194 (web)
- LCCN: 2006233238
- OCLC no.: 60630181

Links
- Journal homepage; Online access

Tectonics is a peer-reviewed scientific journal of geology focusing on tectonics. It is published by the American Geophysical Union in collaboration with the European Geosciences Union.

The journal is edited by John Geissman (University of Texas at Dallas), Laurent Jolivet (Institut des Sciences de la Terre de Paris), Nathan Niemi (University of Michigan) and Taylor Schildgen (University of Potsdam).

== Abtrascting and indexing ==
The journal is abstracted and indexed in the following bibliographic databases:

- Aquatic Sciences and Fisheries Abstracts
- Compendex
- Environment Index
- GEOBASE
- INSPEC
- Science Citation Index Expanded
- Scopus

According to the Journal Citation Reports, the journal has a 2017 impact factor of 3.58.
