= Jay Quade =

American geochemist and geologist

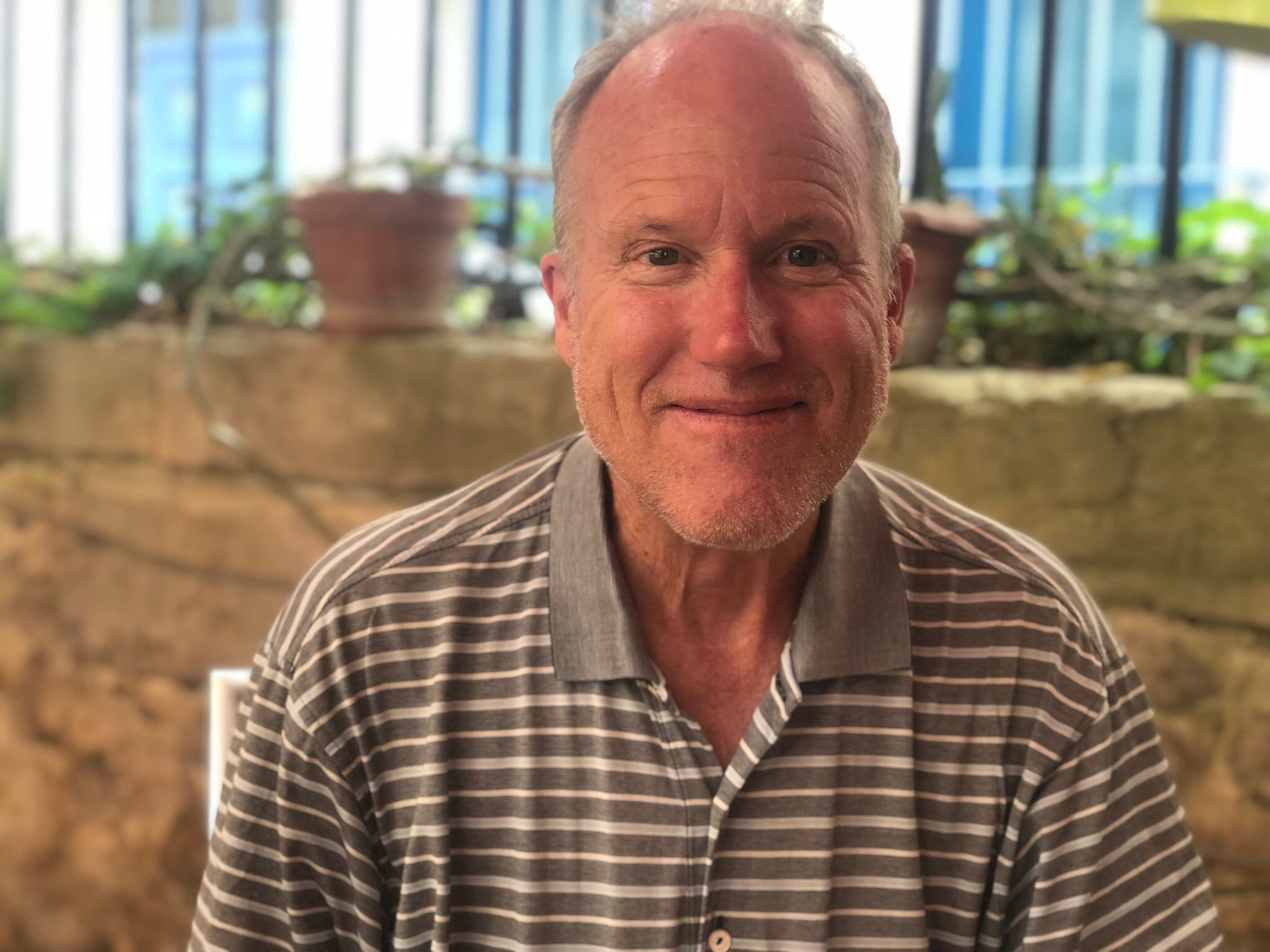
Quade in 2022

Jay Quade (December 13, 1955 - October 17, 2025) was an American geochemist and geologist and former middle-distance runner. He is known for pioneering research applying geochemical isotopic methods for investigations of tectonics, global climate change, and the paleontology of Darwinian evolution.

== Biography ==
Jay Quade was born in Pasadena, California and grew up in Nevada. As a teenager, he set two all-time Nevada State high school track and field records. At the University of New Mexico, he had a track scholarship, for four years. He was twice an NCAA All-American in track and once an NCAA champion in track (relay race). In 1977 he became a geologist employed by the Mineral Exploration Division of Utah International, Inc. In 1978 he graduated with B.S. in geology from the University of New Mexico. In 1982 he graduated with an M.S. in geology from the University of Arizona. From 1982 to 1989 he worked as a geologist in Nevada — from 1982 to 1984 for Noranda Exploration, Inc., from 1984 to 1986 for the Desert Research Institute, and from 1986 to 1989 for Mifflin & Associates (a mining consulting firm founded in 1986 by the geologist Martin David Mifflin). From 1989 to 1990 Quade was a graduate student at the University of Utah, where he received his Ph.D. in 1990. In 1991 he was a postdoc at the Australian National University. At the University of Arizona, he was appointed to an assistant professorship in 1992, an associate professorship in 1998, and a full professorship in 2003, and he was Director of the University's Desert Laboratory on Tumamoc Hill from 1992 to 2007.

Quade's research is remarkably varied, including low-temperature geochemistry, radiometric dating using a variety of isotopes, and theoretical reconstructions of paleoenvironments, mostly from the Cenozoic. Some of his projects have involved archaeologists and anthropologists. Quade with Thure E. Cerling and other colleagues did important research on stable isotope composition of soil carbonate in the Great Basin. In 2001, Quade with Nathan B. English, Julio L. Betancourt, and Jeffrey S. Dean published an important paper on the deforestation of Chaco Canyon. As a geological team member, Quade has done fieldwork on stratigraphy and paleohydrologic reconstruction in the western USA, gold deposits in Oregon, Alaska, and Nevada, and paleo-lake hydrology in Mongolia, Tibet, Chile, Argentina, and the western USA. From 1985 to 2015 his fieldwork on low temperature geochemistry has been done all over the world: parts of the US, Asia, Australia, and South America, as well as Greece and Ethiopia.

In 2001 Quade won the Farouk El-Baz Award of the Geological Society of America (GSA). In 2015 he was elected a Fellow of the Geological Society of American and also a Fellow of the American Geophysical Union (AGU). In 2017 he was elected a Fellow of the Geochemical Society. He received in 2016 a Lady Davis Fellowship from the Hebrew University and in 2017 a Japan Society for the Promotion of Science Fellowship from the University of Tokyo. In 2018 he was awarded the Arthur L. Day Medal. In 2024 he was elected as a member of the National Academy of Sciences, a nonprofit society of distinguished scholars. He was recognized for his critical contributions to the geosciences field, which provide a deeper understanding of Earth's past environments.

== Personal life ==
On December 21, 1984, Jay Quade married Barbra A. Valdez in Nevada City, California. They have three children, Kirstin Valdez Quade, Gratianne Valdez Quade, and Emeric Valdez Quade.

== Selected publications ==
=== Articles ===
- Cerling, T. E.; Quade, J.; Wang, Y.; Bowman, J. R. (1989). "Carbon isotopes in soils and palaeosols as ecology and palaeoecology indicators". Nature. 341 (6238): 138–139. Bibcode:1989Natur.341..138C. doi:10.1038/341138a0. S2CID 4330838.
- Quade, Jay; Cerling, Thure E.; Bowman, John R. (1989). "Development of Asian monsoon revealed by marked ecological shift during the latest Miocene in northern Pakistan". Nature. 342 (6246): 163–166. Bibcode:1989Natur.342..163Q. doi:10.1038/342163a0. S2CID 4363002.
- Cerling, Thure E.; Wang, Yang; Quade, Jay (1993). "Expansion of C4 ecosystems as an indicator of global ecological change in the late Miocene" (PDF). Nature. 361 (6410): 344–345. Bibcode:1993Natur.361..344C. doi:10.1038/361344a0. S2CID 4345173. (See C_{4} carbon fixation.)
  - Cerling, T. E.; Quade, J.; Wang, Y. (1994). "Expansion and emergence of C4 plants". Nature. 371 (6493): 112. Bibcode:1994Natur.371..112C. doi:10.1038/371112a0. S2CID 4351357.
- Decelles, P. G.; Gehrels, G. E.; Quade, J.; Lareau, B.; Spurlin, M. (2000). "Tectonic Implications of U-Pb Zircon Ages of the Himalayan Orogenic Belt in Nepal". Science. 288 (5465): 497–499. Bibcode:2000Sci...288..497D. doi:10.1126/science.288.5465.497. PMID 10775105.
- Betancourt, J. L.; Latorre, C.; Rech, J. A.; Quade, J.; Rylander, K. A. (2000). "A 22,000-Year Record of Monsoonal Precipitation from Northern Chile's Atacama Desert". Science. 289 (5484): 1542–1546. Bibcode:2000Sci...289.1542B. doi:10.1126/science.289.5484.1542. hdl:10533/172205. PMID 10968788.
- Decelles, Peter G.; Quade, Jay; Kapp, Paul; Fan, Majie; Dettman, David L.; Ding, Lin (2007). "High and dry in central Tibet during the Late Oligocene". Earth and Planetary Science Letters. 253 (3–4): 389–401. Bibcode:2007E&PSL.253..389D. doi:10.1016/j.epsl.2006.11.001.
- Simpson, Scott W.; Quade, Jay; Levin, Naomi E.; Butler, Robert; Dupont-Nivet, Guillaume; Everett, Melanie; Semaw, Sileshi (2008). "A Female Homo erectus Pelvis from Gona, Ethiopia". Science. 322 (5904): 1089–1092. Bibcode:2008Sci...322.1089S. doi:10.1126/science.1163592. PMID 19008443. S2CID 22191315.
- Placzek, C.J.; Quade, J.; Patchett, P.J. (2013). "A 130ka reconstruction of rainfall on the Bolivian Altiplano". Earth and Planetary Science Letters. 363: 97–108. Bibcode:2013E&PSL.363...97P. doi:10.1016/j.epsl.2012.12.017.
- Uno, Kevin T.; Quade, Jay; Fisher, Daniel C.; Wittemyer, George; Douglas-Hamilton, Iain; Andanje, Samuel; Omondi, Patrick; Litoroh, Moses; Cerling, Thure E. (2013). "Bomb-curve radiocarbon measurement of recent biologic tissues and applications to wildlife forensics and stable isotope (Paleo)ecology". Proceedings of the National Academy of Sciences. 110 (29): 11736–11741. Bibcode:2013PNAS..11011736U. doi:10.1073/pnas.1302226110. PMC 3718084. PMID 23818577.
- Pigati, Jeffrey S.; Rech, Jason A.; Quade, Jay; Bright, Jordon (2014). "Desert wetlands in the geologic record". Earth-Science Reviews. 132: 67–81. Bibcode:2014ESRv..132...67P. doi:10.1016/j.earscirev.2014.02.001.
- Canavan, R. R.; Carrapa, B.; Clementz, M. T.; Quade, J.; Decelles, P. G.; Schoenbohm, L. M. (2014). "Early Cenozoic uplift of the Puna Plateau, Central Andes, based on stable isotope paleoaltimetry of hydrated volcanic glass". Geology. 42 (5): 447–450. Bibcode:2014Geo....42..447C. doi:10.1130/G35239.1.

=== Books ===
- Macfarlane, Allison; Sorkhabi, Rasoul B.; Quade, Jay, eds. (1999). Himalaya and Tibet: mountain roots to mountain tops. Boulder, Colorada: Geological Society of America. ISBN 0-8137-2328-0. LCCN 98043984.
- Quade, Jay; Wynn, Jonathan G., eds. (2008). The Geology of Early Humans in the Horn of Africa. Boulder, Colorada: Geological Society of America (GSA). ISBN 9780813724461. LCCN 2008031482.
  - Quade, Jay; Wynn, Jonathan G. (2008). The Geology of Early Humans in the Horn of Africa. doi:10.1130/SPE446. ISBN 9780813724461.
