= Pterophocaena =

Pterophocaena Temporal range: Late Miocene 9.3–9.2 Ma

Scientific classification
- Kingdom: Animalia
- Phylum: Chordata
- Class: Mammalia
- Order: Artiodactyla
- Infraorder: Cetacea
- Family: Phocoenidae
- Genus: †Pterophocaena; Murakami, Shimada, Hikida, and Hirano, 2012
- Species: †P. nishinoi

Binomial name
- †Pterophocaena nishinoi Murakami, Shimada, Hikida, and Hirano, 2011

Extinct genus of porpoises

Pterophocaena nishinoi is an extinct species of porpoise discovered in the Late Miocene Wakkanai Formation of Japan dating to 9.3–9.2 million years ago (mya), and may represent an intermediate phase between porpoises and dolphins. It is one of the oldest species discovered, after the Middle Miocene Loxolithax 16–14.8 mya and the Late Miocene Salumiphocaena 12.6–9 mya. The holotype specimen comprises a partial skeleton. The genus name derives from Ancient Greek pteryx, "wing," in reference to its unusually pronounced beak, and Latin phocaena, "porpoise." The species name honors the discoverer of the holotype, Takanobu Nishino.
