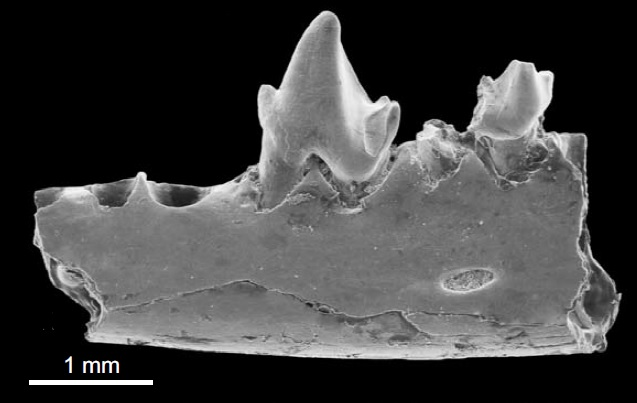
- Jaw fragment of Bustylus marandati

Scientific classification
- Kingdom: Animalia
- Phylum: Chordata
- Class: Mammalia
- Clade: Eutheria
- Family: †Adapisoriculidae; Van Valen (1967)

Genera
- Adapisoriculus; Afrodon; Bustylus; Deccanolestes?; Garatherium; Namibiodon; Remiculus?; Sahnitherium?; Wyonycteris?

= Adapisoriculidae =

Adapisoriculidae Temporal range: Paleocene–Eocene Possible Late Cretaceous record

Extinct family of eutherian mammals

Adapisoriculidae is an extinct family of non-placental eutherian mammals which was present during the Paleogene and possibly the Late Cretaceous. They were once thought to be members of the order Erinaceomorpha, closely related to the hedgehog family (Erinaceidae), because of their similar dentition, or to be basal Euarchontans. They were also thought to be marsupials at one point. Most recent studies show them to be non-placental eutherians, however.

They were small mammals of about 15 cm long, with a tail of equal length. They were probably nocturnal, eating insects and fruits.

Deccanolestes and Sahnitherium from the Late Cretaceous of India may be Cretaceous members of Adapisoriculidae.
