= Aguascalientia =

Aguascalientia Temporal range: Miocene

Scientific classification
- Domain: Eukaryota
- Kingdom: Animalia
- Phylum: Chordata
- Class: Mammalia
- Order: Artiodactyla
- Family: Camelidae
- Subfamily: †Floridatragulinae
- Genus: †Aguascalientia; Stevens 1977

Type species
- †Aguascalientia wilsoni

Species
- A. wilsoni (Dalquest & Mooser, 1974); A. panamaensis Rincon et al, 2012; A. minuta Rincon et al, 2012

Extinct genus of mammals

Aguascalientia is an extinct genus of miniature camelids, endemic to North America (as far south as the Panama Canal) during the Early Miocene 23.0—20.4 mya existing for approximately 3 million years.
