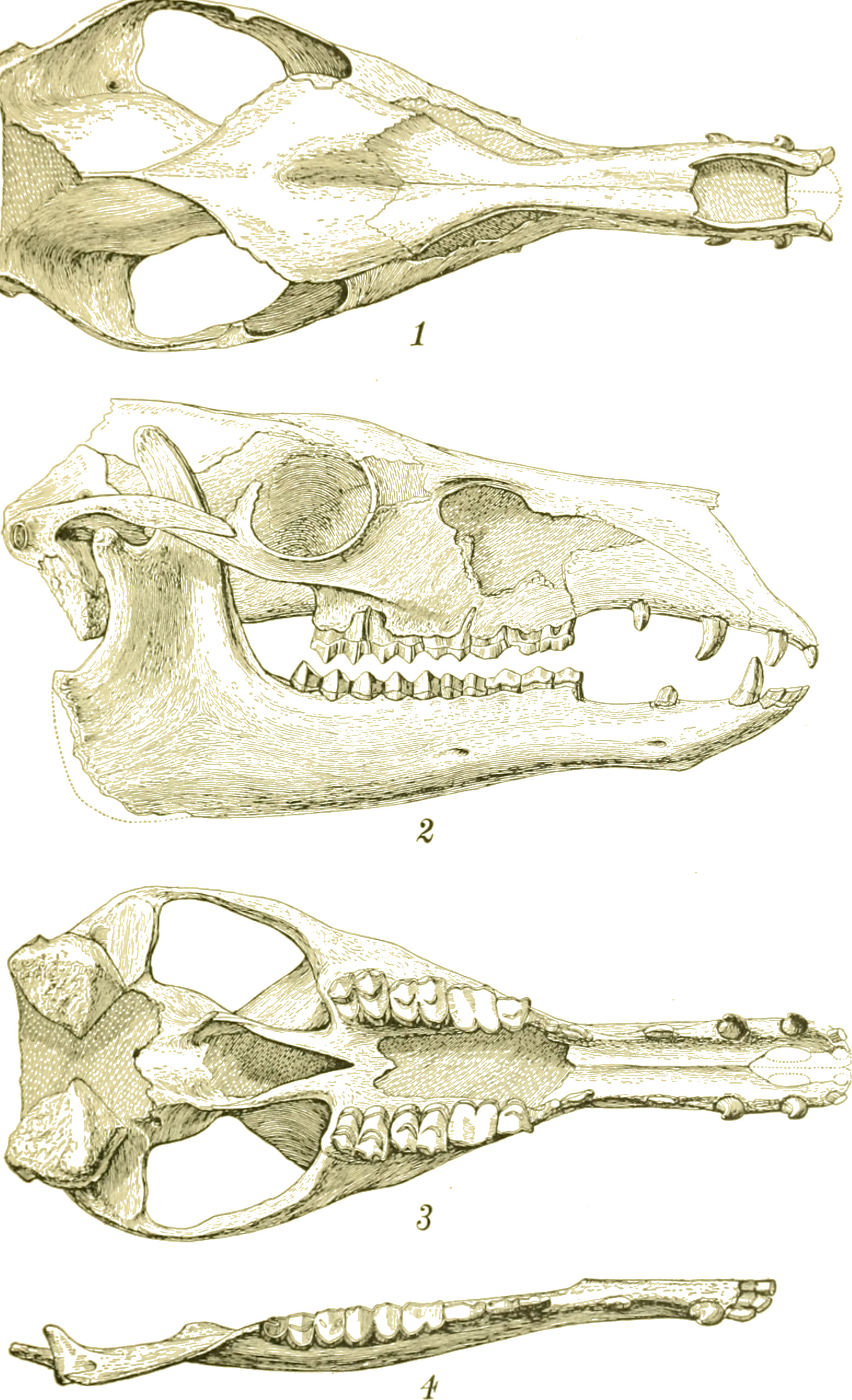

Scientific classification
- Domain: Eukaryota
- Kingdom: Animalia
- Phylum: Chordata
- Class: Mammalia
- Order: Artiodactyla
- Family: Camelidae
- Tribe: Camelini
- Genus: †Tanymykter; Honey and Taylor 1978

Species
- T. brachyodontus Peterson 1904; T. longirostris Peterson 1911

= Tanymykter =

Tanymykter Temporal range: Early Miocene

Extinct genus of mammals

Tanymykter is an extinct genus of camelid, endemic to North America. It lived during the Miocene epoch 20.4—16.0 mya, existing for approximately 4 million years. Fossils have been found from Wyoming and Nebraska to Santa Barbara County, California.
