= List of the Cenozoic life of Kansas =

This list of the Cenozoic life of Kansas contains the various prehistoric life-forms whose fossilized remains have been reported from within the US state of Kansas and are between 66 million and 10,000 years of age.

== A ==
- Acris
  - †Acris crepitans
- †Adelphailurus
  - †Adelphailurus kansensis – type locality for species
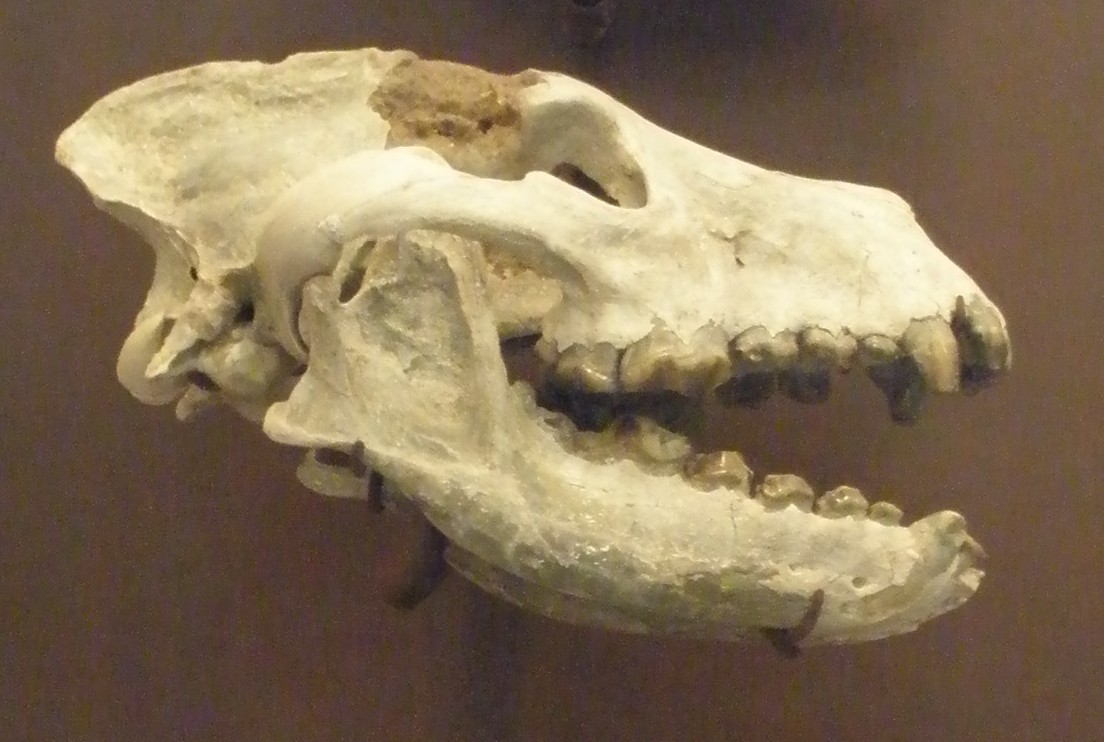
- Fossilized skull of the Miocene bone-crushing dog Aelurodon
  †Aelurodon
  - †Aelurodon taxoides
- Agkistrodon
  - †Agkistrodon contortix
- †Agriocharis
  - †Agriocharis progenes – type locality for species
- †Agriotherium
- †Alforjas
  - †Alforjas taylori
- †Alilepus
  - †Alilepus hibbardi
- †Allogona
  - †Allogona profunda
- †Allophaiomys
  - †Allophaiomys pliocaenicus
- †Ambystoma
  - †Ambystoma maculatum
  - †Ambystoma tigrinum
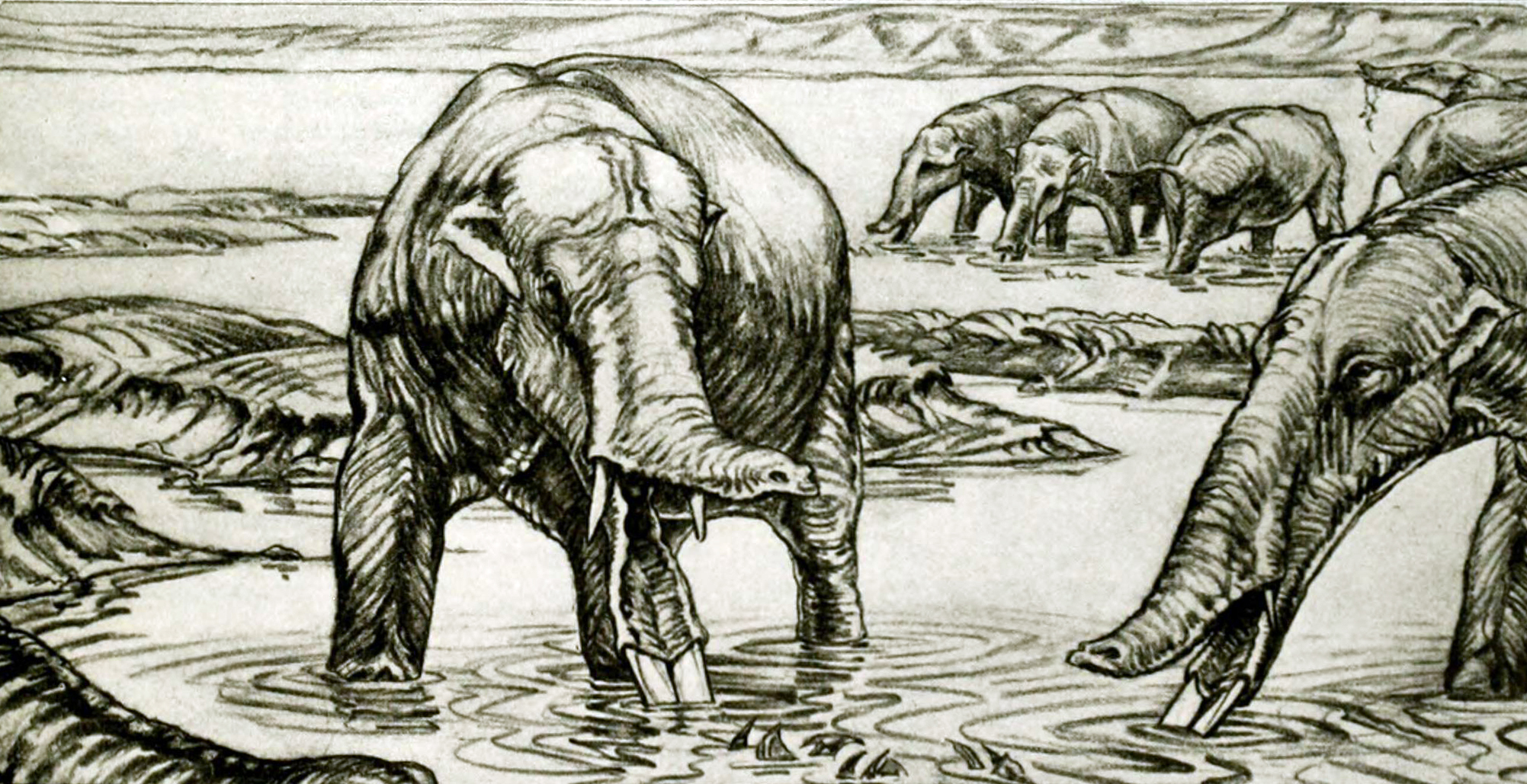
- Life restoration of the Miocene elephant relative Amebelodon. Margret Flinsch (1932).
  †Amebelodon
  - †Amebelodon britti
- Amia
  - †Amia calva
- †Amphimachairodus
  - †Amphimachairodus coloradensis
- Anas
  - †Anas crecca
- †Anchiblarinella
  - †Anchiblarinella wakeeneyensis – type locality for species
- †Aphelops
  - †Aphelops malacorhinus
  - †Aphelops mutilus
- Aplodinotus
  - †Aplodinotus grunniens – or unidentified comparable form
- †Arctodus
  - †Arctodus pristinus – or unidentified comparable form
  - †Arctodus simus
- †Astrohippus
  - †Astrohippus ansae

== B ==
- Baiomys
  - †Baiomys kolbi – type locality for species
  - †Baiomys rexroadi – type locality for species
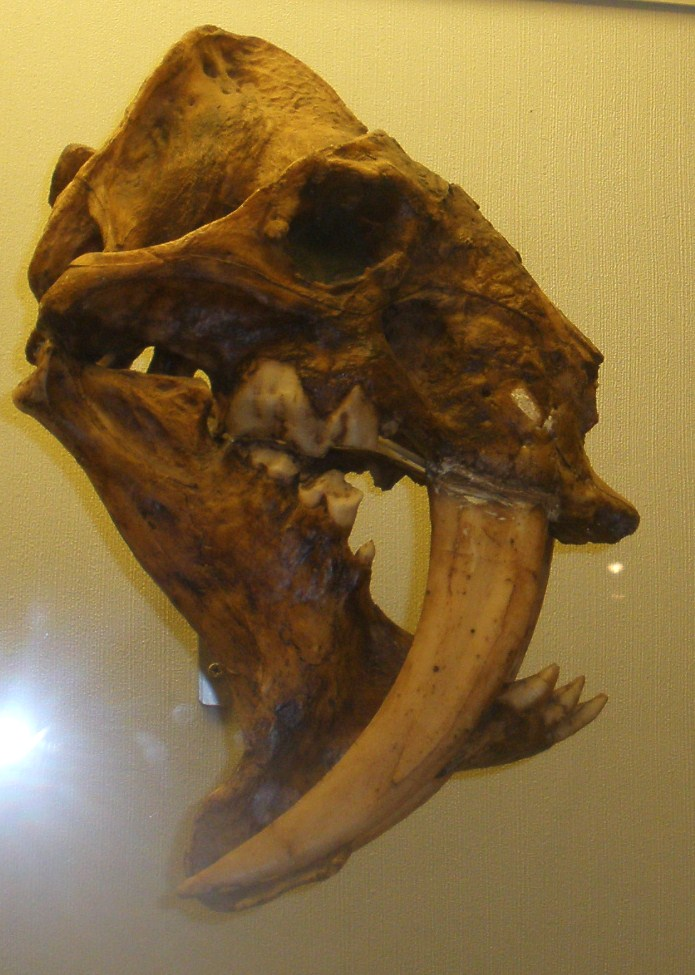
- Fossilized skull of the Miocene-Pliocene false saber-toothed cat Barbourofelis
  †Barbourofelis
- Bassariscus
  - †Bassariscus casei – type locality for species
  - †Bassariscus ogallalae
- †Bensonomys
  - †Bensonomys eliasi
  - †Bensonomys meadensis – type locality for species
  - †Bensonomys stirtoni
- †Berriochloa
  - †Berriochloa amphoralis
  - †Berriochloa maxima
  - †Berriochloa minuta
  - †Berriochloa pumila
  - †Berriochloa tuberculata
  - †Berriochloa variegata
- †Biorbia
  - †Biorbia fossilia
- Bison
  - †Bison antiquus – type locality for species
  - †Bison bison
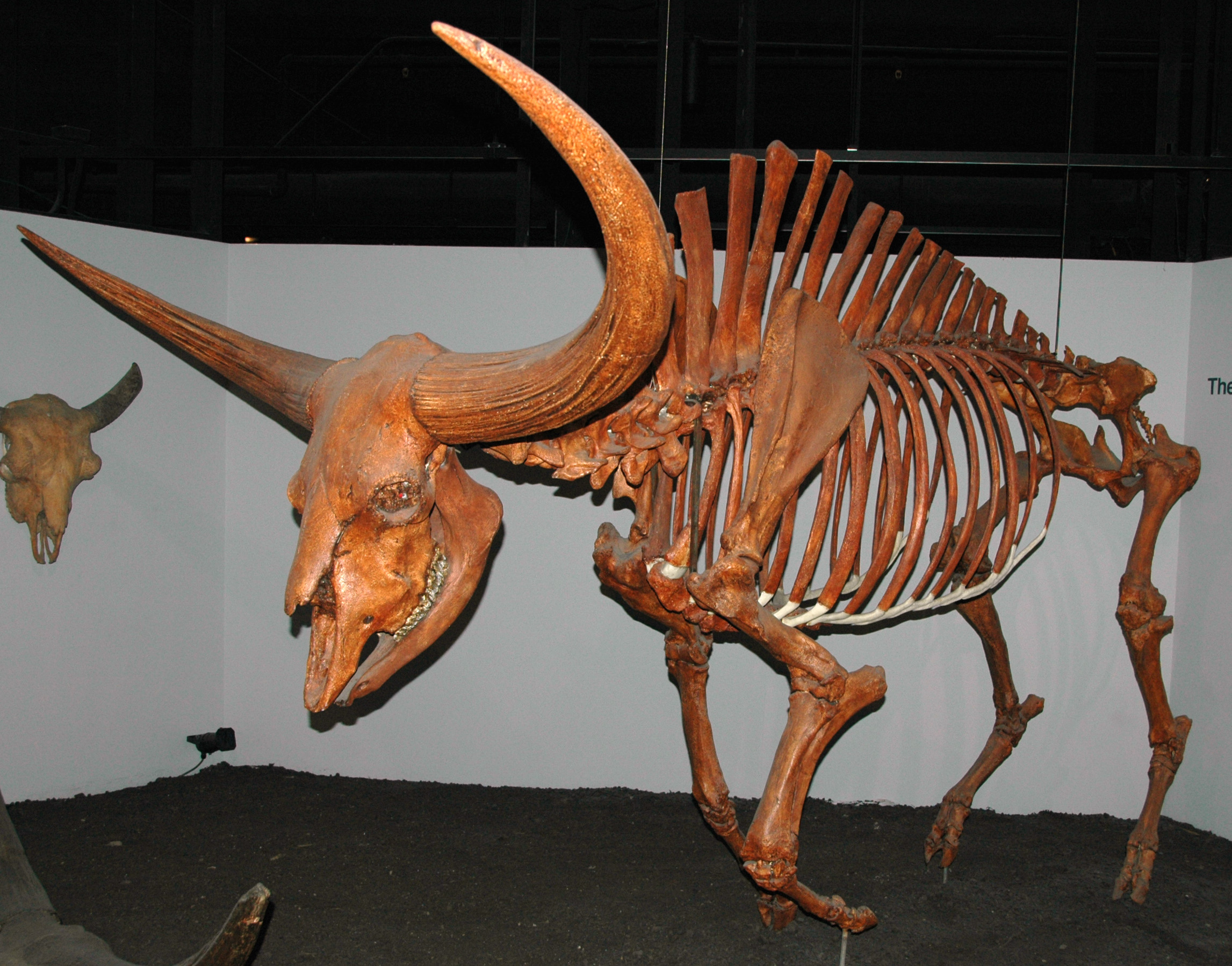
  - Mounted fossilized skeleton of the Pleistocene Bison latifrons, also known as the giant bison or long-horned bison
    †Bison latifrons
- Blarina
  - †Blarina brevicauda
  - †Blarina carolinensis
- †Borophagus
  - †Borophagus diversidens
  - †Borophagus hilli
  - †Borophagus pugnator
  - †Borophagus secundus – type locality for species
- Botaurus
  - †Botaurus hibbardi – type locality for species
- †Brachyopsigale
  - †Brachyopsigale dubius – type locality for species
- Bufo
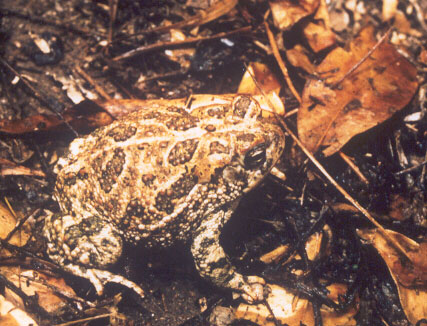
  - A living Anaxyrus cognatus (formerly Bufo cognatus), or Great Plains toad
    †Bufo cognatus
  - †Bufo hemiophrys
  - †Bufo hibbardi
  - †Bufo marinus
  - †Bufo pliocompactilis – type locality for species
  - †Bufo valentinensis
  - †Bufo woodhousei
- †Buisnictis
  - †Buisnictis breviramus – type locality for species
  - †Buisnictis schoffi

== C ==
- †Calippus
  - †Calippus large informal
  - †Calippus martini
  - †Calippus regulus
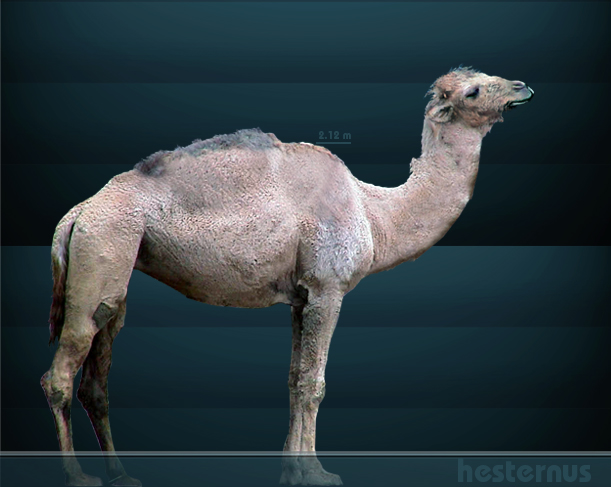
- Life restoration of the Pliocene-Holocene camel Camelops
  †Camelops
- Candona
  - †Candona lactea – or unidentified comparable form
  - †Candona nyensis
  - †Candona truncata
- Canis
  - †Canis armbrusteri
  - †Canis dirus
  - †Canis edwardii
  - †Canis ferox
  - †Canis latrans
  - †Canis lepophagus
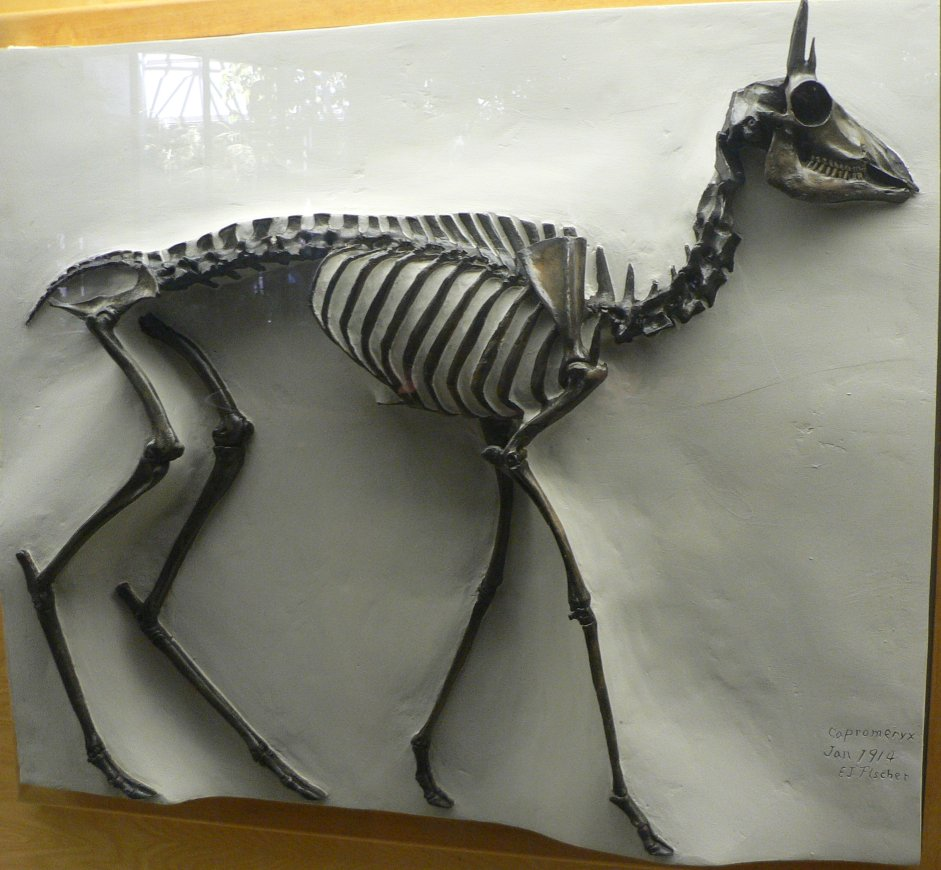
- Fossilized skeleton of the Pleistocene dwarf pronghorn Capromeryx
  †Capromeryx
  - †Capromeryx furcifer
- †Carpocyon
  - †Carpocyon compressus
- Carychium
  - †Carychium exiguum
- Castor
  - †Castor canadensis
- †Castoroides
  - †Castoroides ohioensis – or unidentified comparable form
- †Catostomus
  - †Catostomus commersoni
- Celtis
  - †Celtis willistonii
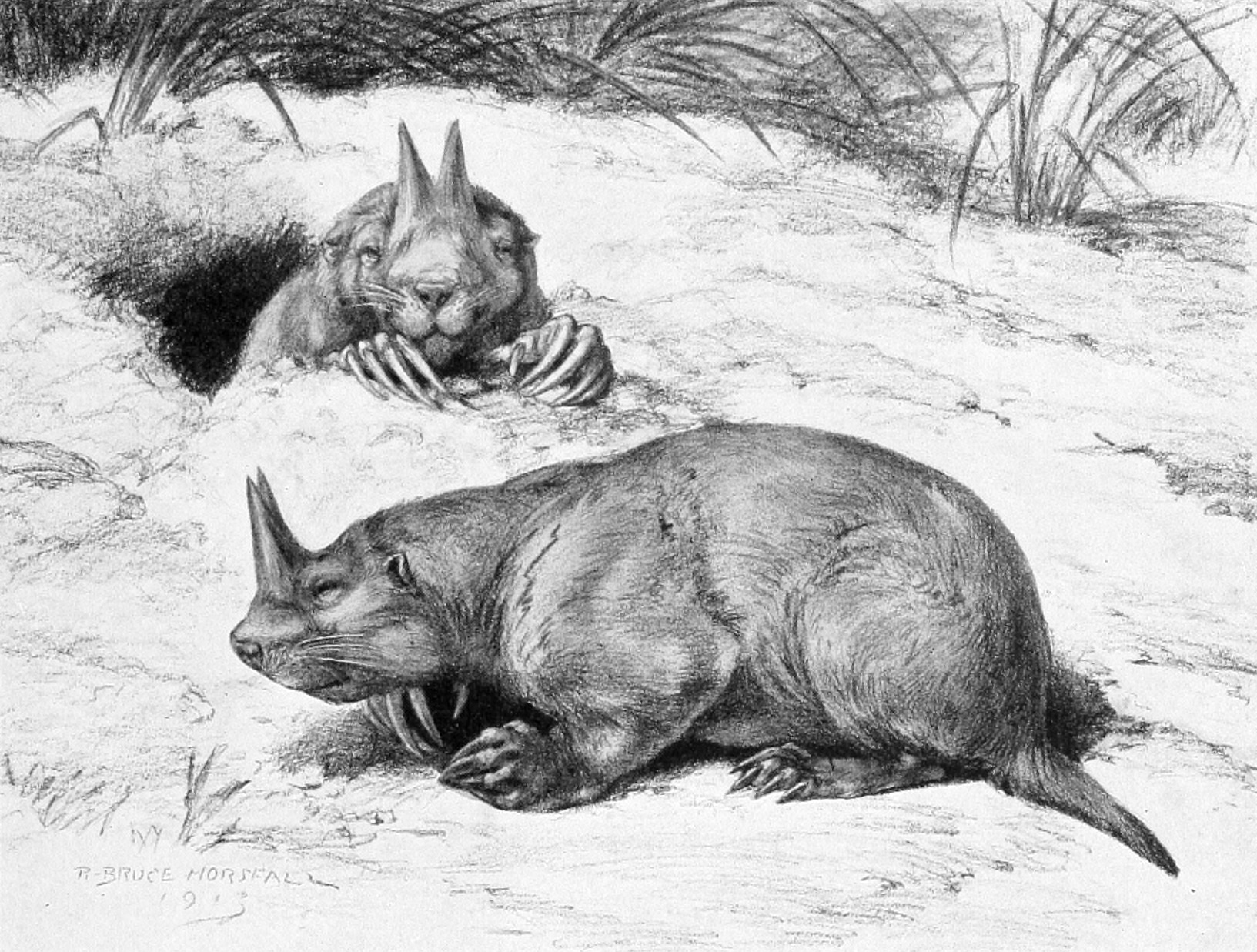
- Life restoration of the Miocene-Pleistocene horned gopher Ceratogaulus. Robert Bruce Horsfall (1913).
  †Ceratogaulus
  - †Ceratogaulus hatcheri
  - †Ceratogaulus minor
- †Cervalces
  - †Cervalces scotti
- Cervus
  - †Cervus elaphus
- Chaetodipus
  - †Chaetodipus hispidus
- Chara
  - †Chara globularis – or unidentified comparable form
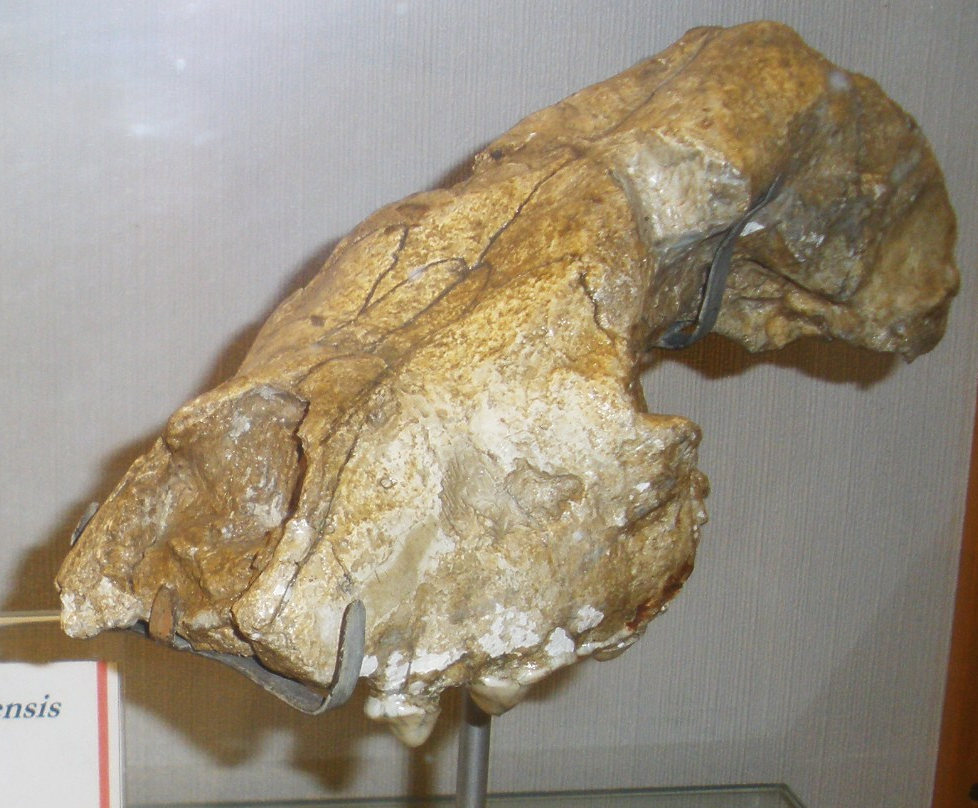
- Fossilized cranium of the Pliocene-Pleistocene hyena Chasmaporthetes
  †Chasmaporthetes
- Chelydra
  - †Chelydra serpentina
- Chrysemys
  - †Chrysemys picta
  - †Chrysemys scripta
- †Cionella
  - †Cionella lubrica
- Clethrionomys
  - †Clethrionomys gapperi
- Cnemidophorus
  - †Cnemidophorus bilobatus
  - †Cnemidophorus sexlineatus
- Coluber
  - †Coluber constrictor
- †Copemys – type locality for genus
  - †Copemys pisinnus
  - †Copemys shotwelli – type locality for species
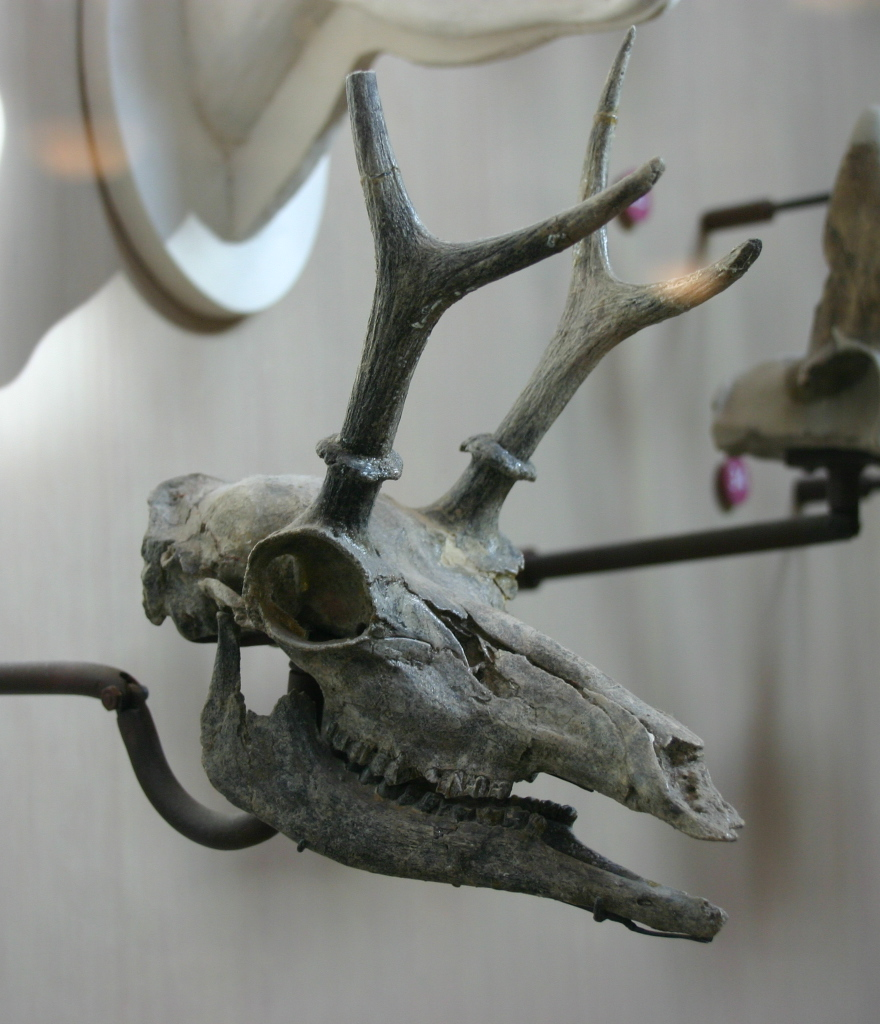
- Fossilized skull of the Miocene pronghorn Cosoryx
  †Cosoryx
  - †Cosoryx furcatus
- Crotalus
  - †Crotalus viridis
- †Cryptantha
  - †Cryptantha auriculata
- Cryptotis
  - †Cryptotis adamsi
  - †Cryptotis kansasensis – type locality for species
  - †Cryptotis meadensis – type locality for species
  - †Cryptotis parva
- Cynomys
  - †Cynomys gunnisoni – or unidentified comparable form
  - †Cynomys hibbardi – type locality for species
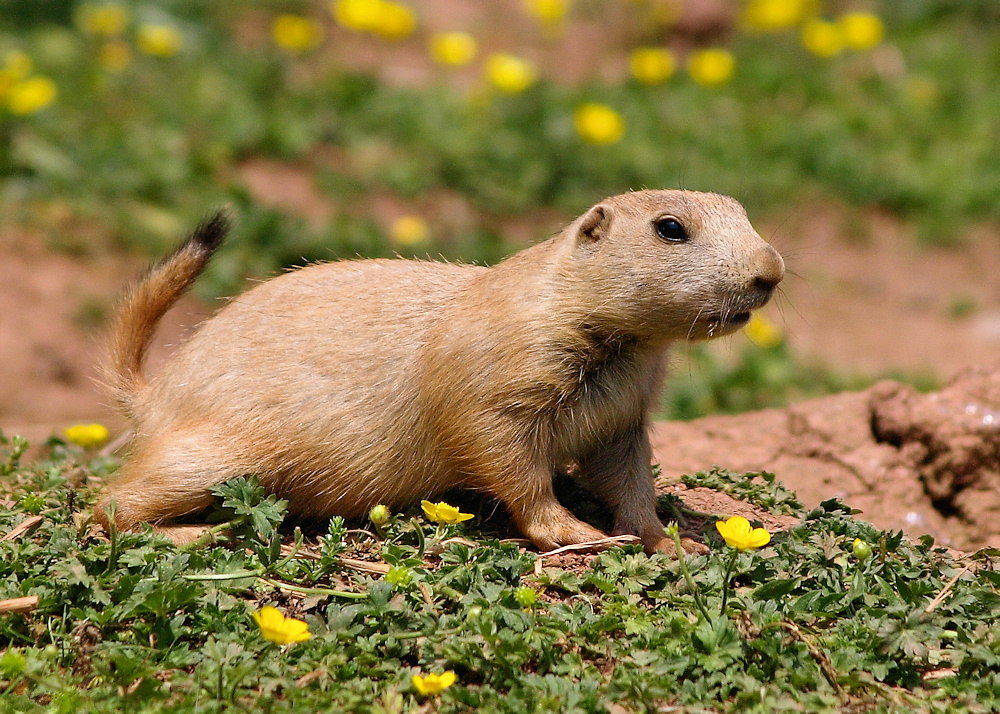
  - A living Cynomys ludovicianus, or black-tailed prairie dog
    †Cynomys ludovicianus
  - †Cynomys niobrarius
  - †Cynomys spenceri
  - †Cynomys vetus – type locality for species
- Cyprideis
  - †Cyprideis littoralis
- Cyprinotus – tentative report

== D ==
- Deroceras
  - †Deroceras aenigma
- Diadophis
  - †Diadophis punctatus
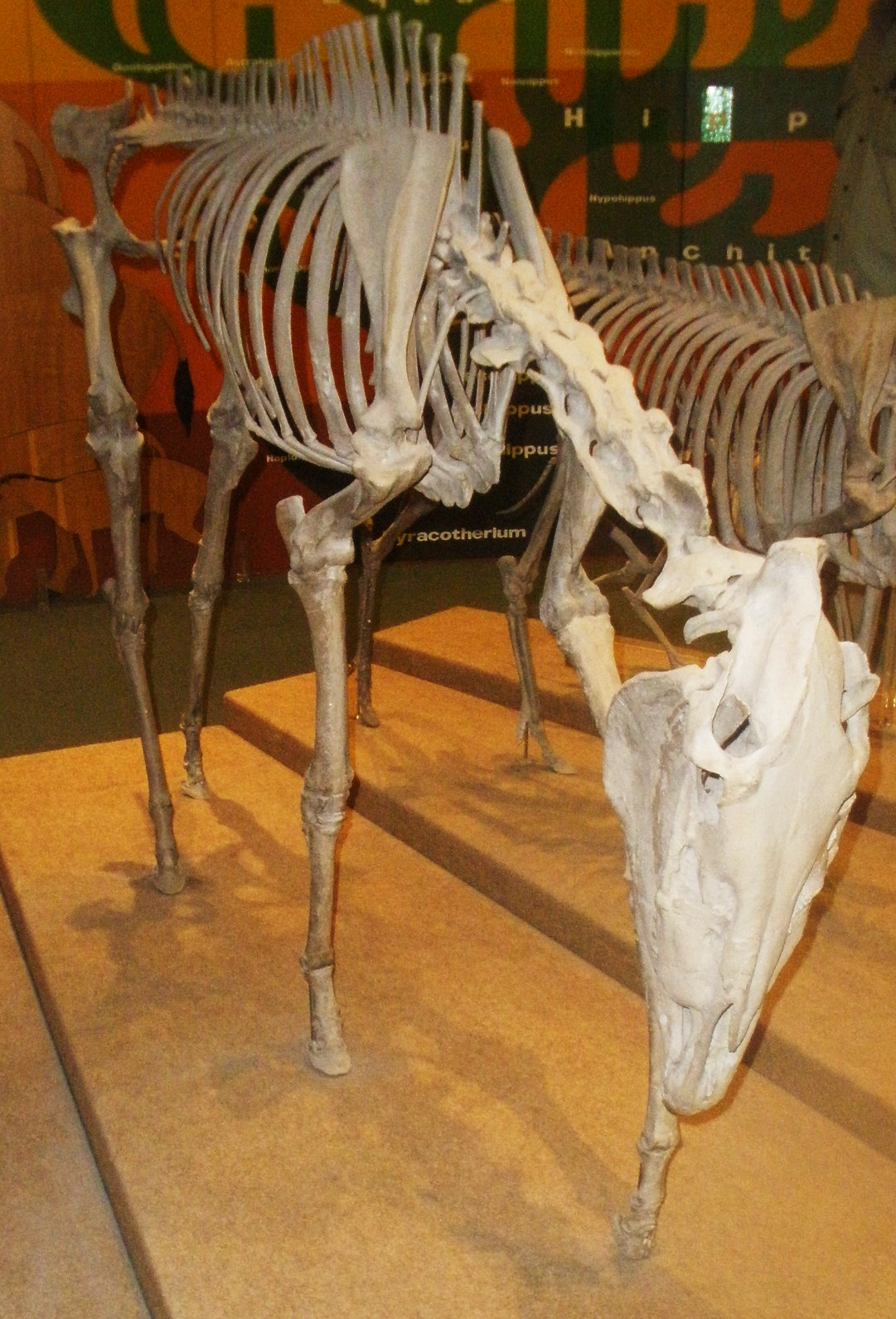
- Mounted fossilized skeleton of the Miocene-Pliocene horse Dinohippus
  †Dinohippus
  - †Dinohippus interpolatus
  - †Dinohippus leidyanus
- Dipodomys
  - †Dipodomys hibbardi – type locality for species
  - †Dipodomys ordii – or unidentified comparable form
- †Dipoides
  - †Dipoides rexroadensis – type locality for species
  - †Dipoides wilsoni – type locality for species
- Discus
  - †Discus cronkhitei
- †Domninoides
  - †Domninoides mimicus – type locality for species

== E ==
- Egretta
- Elaphe – type locality for genus
  - †Elaphe kansensis – type locality for species
  - †Elaphe obsoleta
  - †Elaphe vulpina
- Emydoidea
  - †Emydoidea twentei
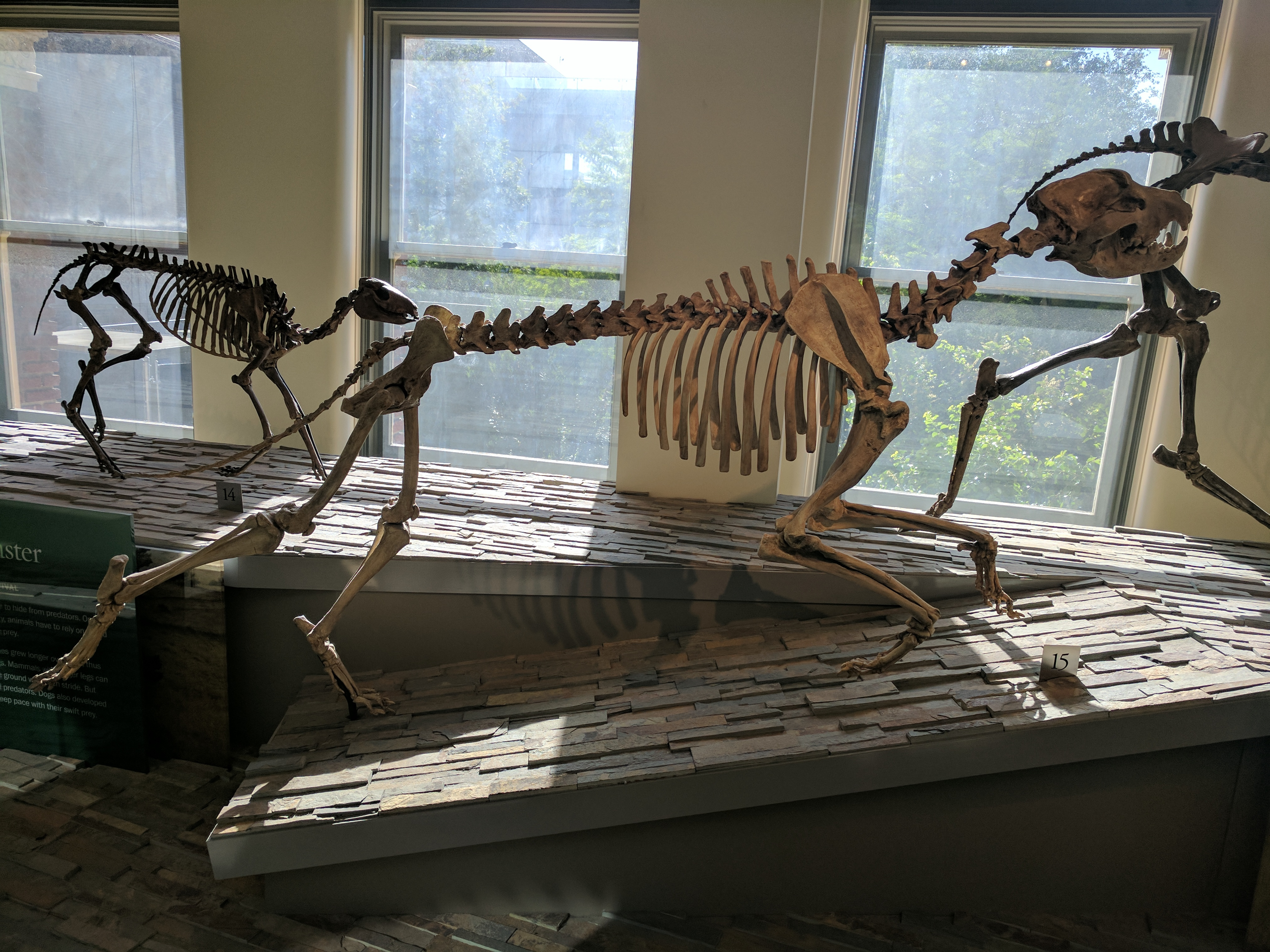
- Mounted fossilized skeleton of the Miocene bone-crushing dog Epicyon
  †Epicyon
  - †Epicyon aelurodontoides – type locality for species
  - †Epicyon haydeni
  - †Epicyon saevus
- Equus
  - †Equus conversidens
  - †Equus francisci
  - †Equus giganteus – or unidentified comparable form
  - †Equus niobrarensis
  - †Equus scotti
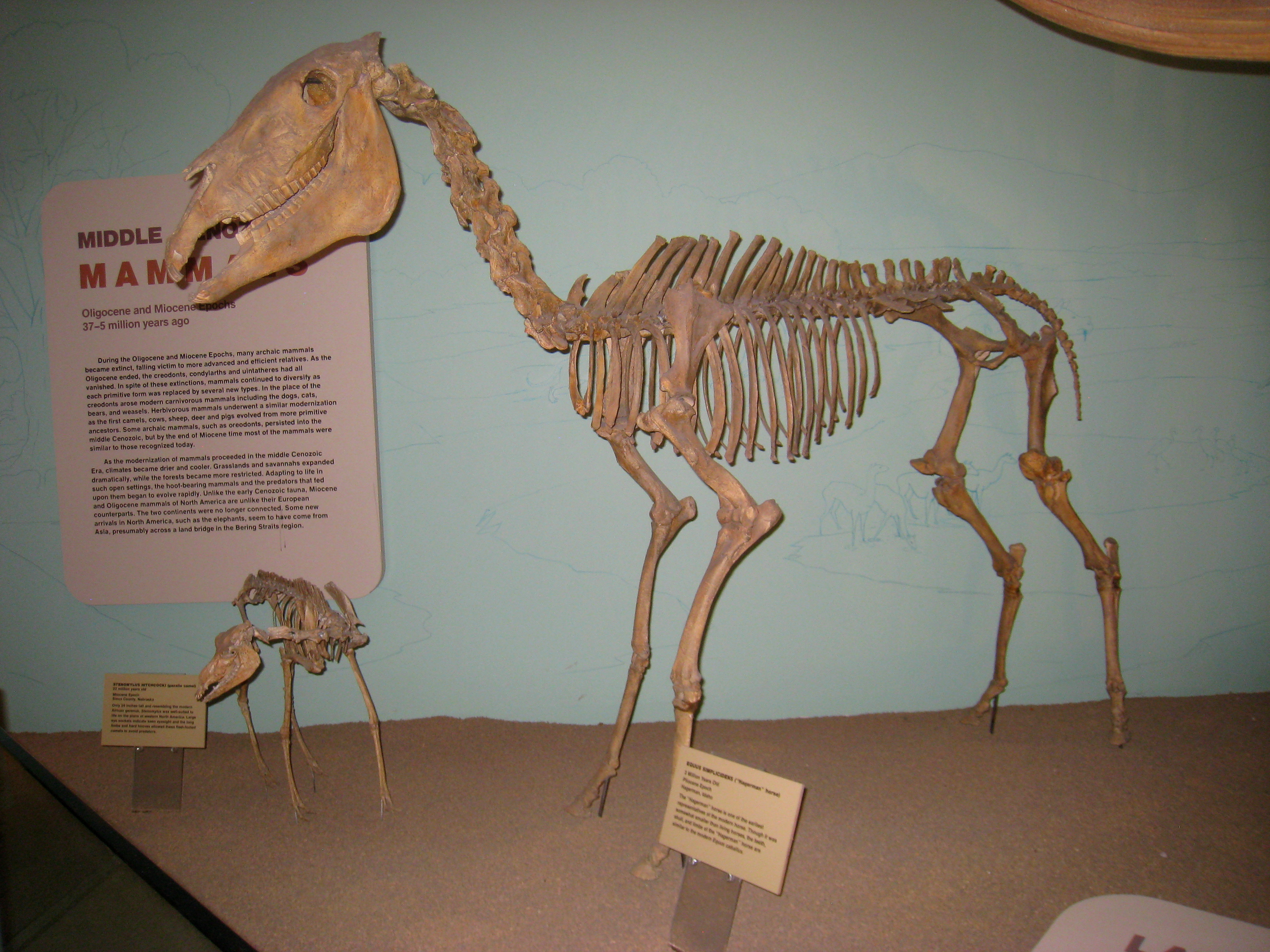
  - Fossilized skeleton of the Pliocene-Pleistocene horse Equus simplicidens, also known as the Hagerman horse or American zebra
    †Equus simplicidens
- †Eucastor
- †Euconulus
  - †Euconulus fulvus
- †Eucyon
  - †Eucyon davisi
- Eumeces
  - †Eumeces fasciatus
  - †Eumeces hixsonorum – type locality for species
  - †Eumeces obsoletus
  - †Eumeces septentrionalis
  - †Eumeces striatulus
- †Eumecoides
  - †Eumecoides hibbardi
  - †Eumecoides mylocoelus

== F ==
- Felis
  - †Felis rexroadensis
- †Ferissia
  - †Ferissia fragilis – or unidentified comparable form
- Ferrissia
  - †Ferrissia rivularis
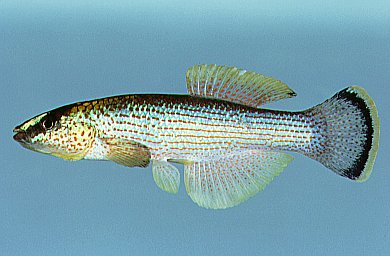
- A living Fundulus
  †Fundulus

== G ==
- Gastrocopta
  - †Gastrocopta armifera
  - †Gastrocopta cristata
  - †Gastrocopta tappaniana
- Geochelone
- Geomys
  - †Geomys adamsi – type locality for species
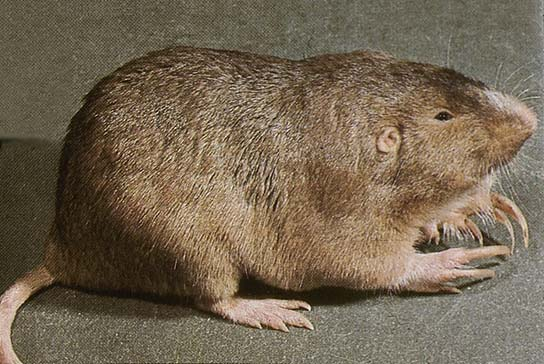
  - A living Geomys bursarius, or Plains pocket gopher
    †Geomys bursarius
  - †Geomys jacobi – type locality for species
  - †Geomys minor
  - †Geomys quinni
  - †Geomys tobinensis
- Gerrhonotus
  - †Gerrhonotus mungerorum – type locality for species
- †Gigantocamelus
  - †Gigantocamelus spatulus
- †Gnathabelodon
  - †Gnathabelodon thorpei – type locality for species
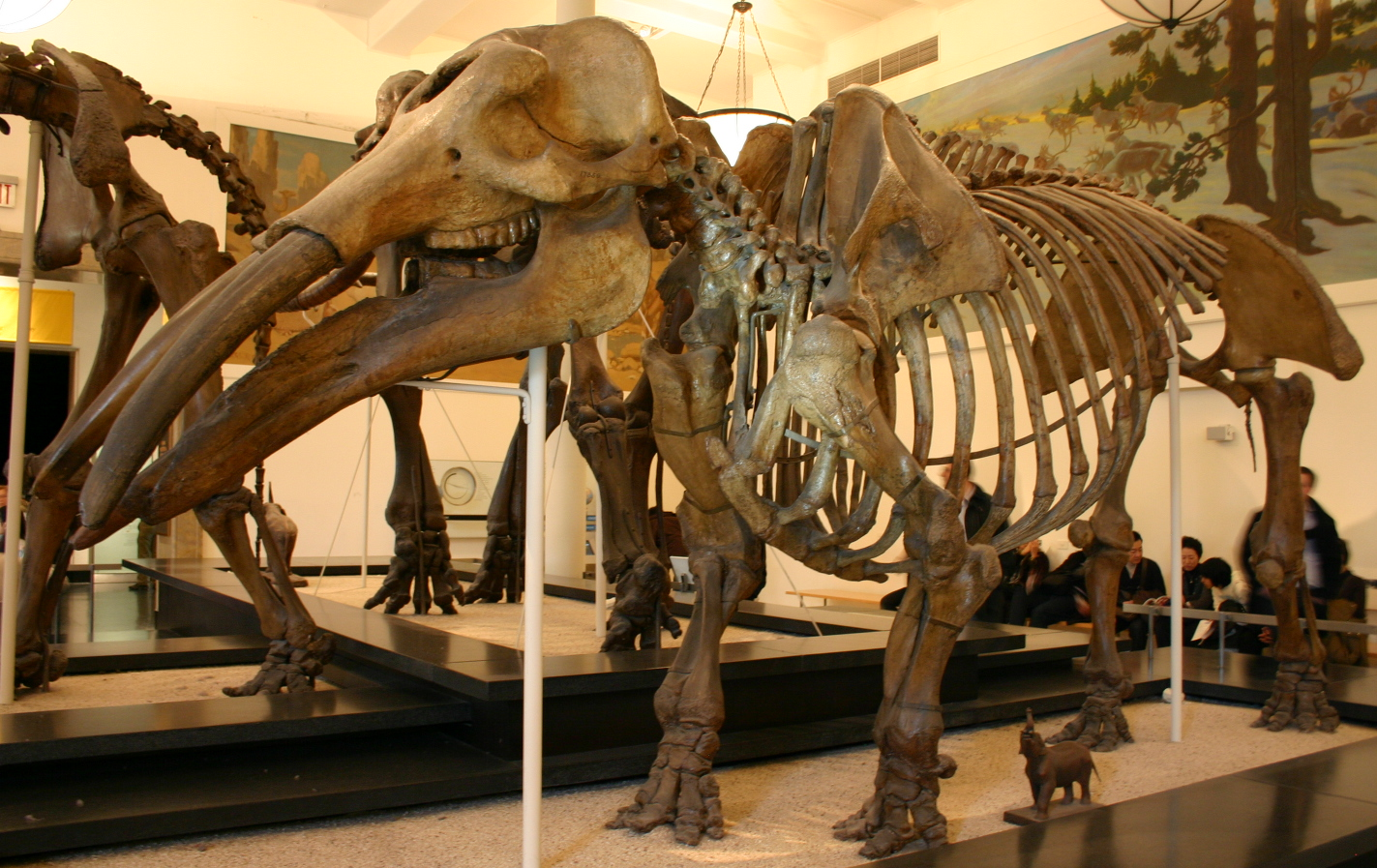
- Mounted fossilized skeleton of the Miocene-Pleistocene elephant relative Gomphotherium
  †Gomphotherium
- Gopherus
- Graptemys
  - †Graptemys geographica
- Grus
  - †Grus americana
  - †Grus nannodes – type locality for species
- †Guildayomys
  - †Guildayomys hibbardi
- Gyraulus
  - †Gyraulus parvus

== H ==
- Hawaiia
  - †Hawaiia miniscula
  - †Hawaiia minuscula
- Helicodiscus
  - †Helicodiscus paralellus
  - †Helicodiscus parallelus
- Helisoma
  - †Helisoma anceps
  - †Helisoma lentum
  - †Helisoma trivolvis
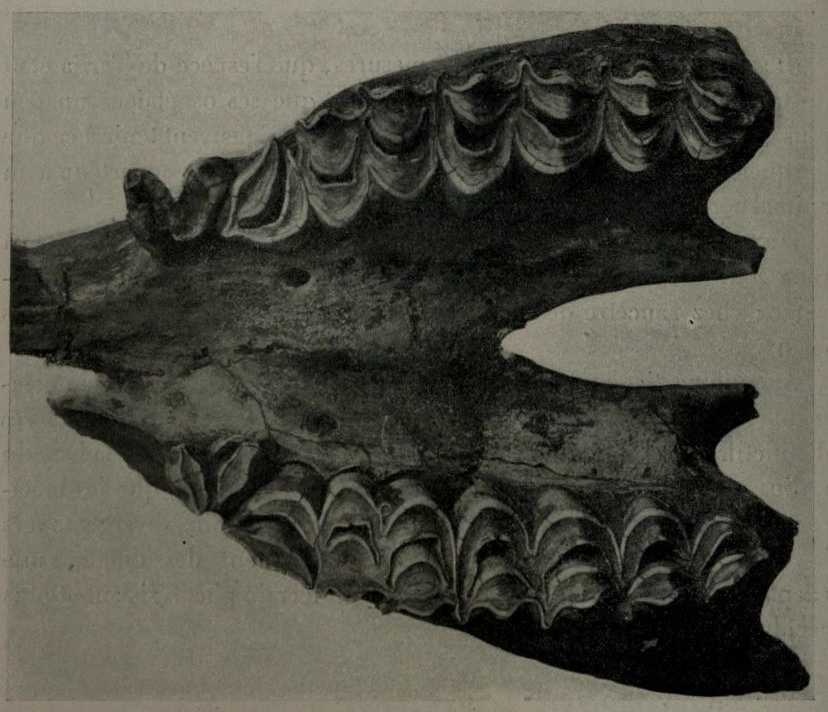
- Fossilized lower jaw of the Miocene-Pleistocene llama relative Hemiauchenia
  †Hemiauchenia
  - †Hemiauchenia macrocephala
- †Hesperoscalops
  - †Hesperoscalops rexroadi – type locality for species
  - †Hesperoscalops sewardensis – type locality for species
- †Hesperotestudo
  - †Hesperotestudo orthopygia
  - †Hesperotestudo riggsi
- Heterodon
  - †Heterodon nasicus
  - †Heterodon platyrhinos
  - †Heterodon plionasicus
- †Hibbardomys
  - †Hibbardomys fayae – type locality for species
  - †Hibbardomys marthae
  - †Hibbardomys voorhiesi
- †Hipparion
  - †Hipparion tehonense – or unidentified comparable form
- †Hippotherium
- Holbrookia
  - †Holbrookia maculata
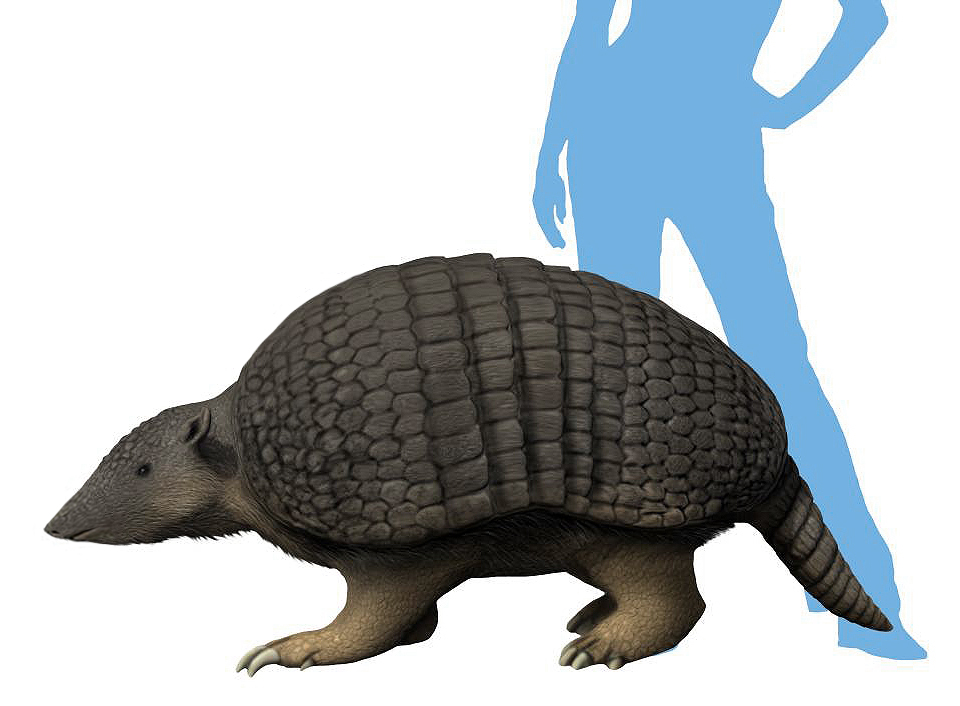
- Life restoration of the Pleistocene armadillo relative Holmesina with a human to scale
  †Holmesina
  - †Holmesina septentrionalis
- Homo
  - †Homo sapiens
- †Homotherium
  - †Homotherium serum
- Hyla
  - †Hyla cinerea – or unidentified comparable form
  - †Hyla gratiosa – or unidentified comparable form
  - †Hyla squirella – or unidentified comparable form
  - †Hyla versicolor
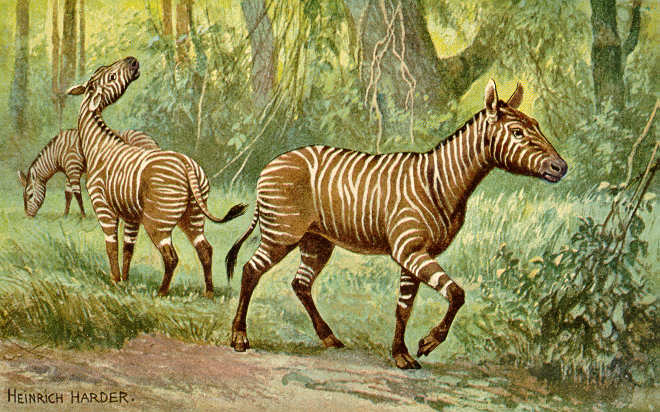
- Life restoration of the Miocene horse Hypohippus. Heinrich Harder (1920).
  †Hypohippus
- †Hypolagus
  - †Hypolagus regalis – type locality for species
  - †Hypolagus ringoldensis
  - †Hypolagus vetus
  - †Hypolagus voorhiesi
- †Hystricops

== I ==
- Ictalurus
  - †Ictalurus lambda
  - †Ictalurus melas
  - †Ictalurus punctatus
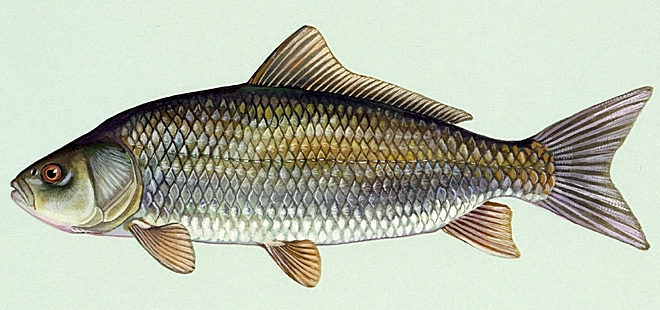
- Illustration of a living Ictiobus, or buffalo fish
  †Ictiobus
- Ilyocypris
  - †Ilyocypris bradyi
- †Ischyrocyon – tentative report

== K ==
- †Kansasimys
  - †Kansasimys dubius
- Kinosternon
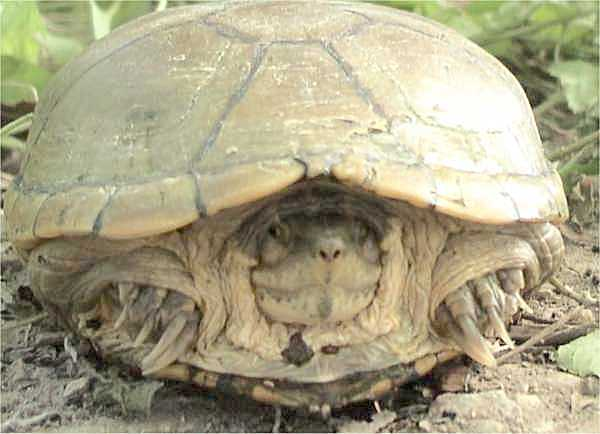
  - A living Kinosternon flavescens, or yellow mud turtle
    †Kinosternon flavescens
  - †Kinosternon subrubrum

== L ==
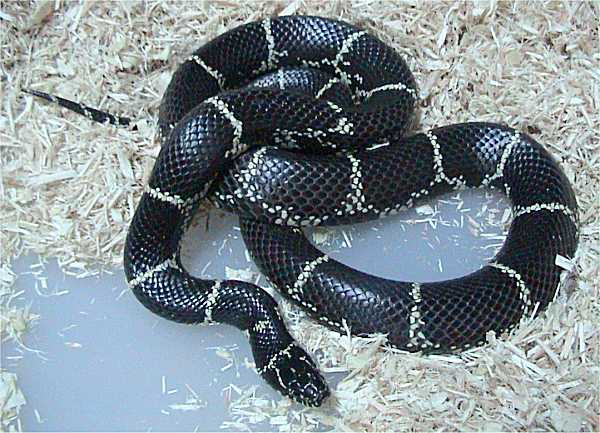
- A living Lampropeltis getula, or eastern kingsnake
  Lampropeltis
  - †Lampropeltis calligaster
  - †Lampropeltis doliata
  - †Lampropeltis getulus
  - †Lampropeltis similis
- Lasiurus
  - †Lasiurus cinereus
  - †Lasiurus fossilis – type locality for species
  - †Lasiurus golliheri – type locality for species
- Lepisosteus
  - †Lepisosteus osseus
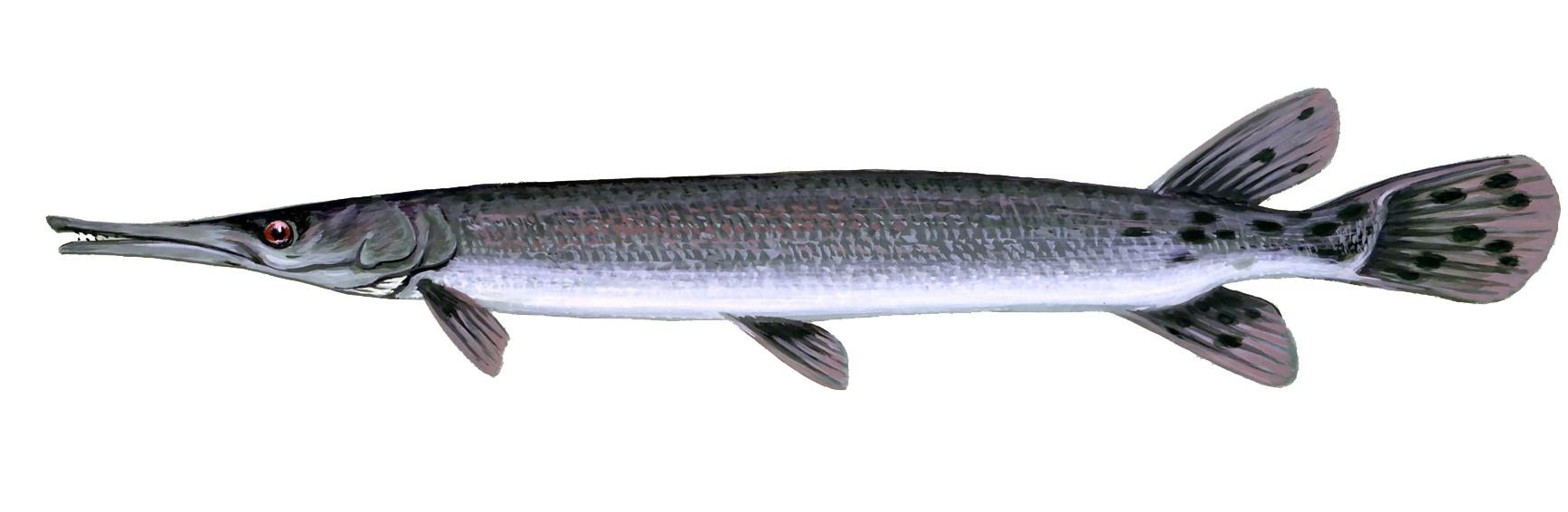
  - Illustration of a living Lepisosteus platostomus, or shortnose gar
    †Lepisosteus platostomus – tentative report
- Lepomis
  - †Lepomis cyanellus
  - †Lepomis humilis – or unidentified comparable form
- †Leptarctus
  - †Leptarctus mummorum – type locality for species
  - †Leptarctus woodburnei – type locality for species
  - †Leptarctus wortmani – type locality for species
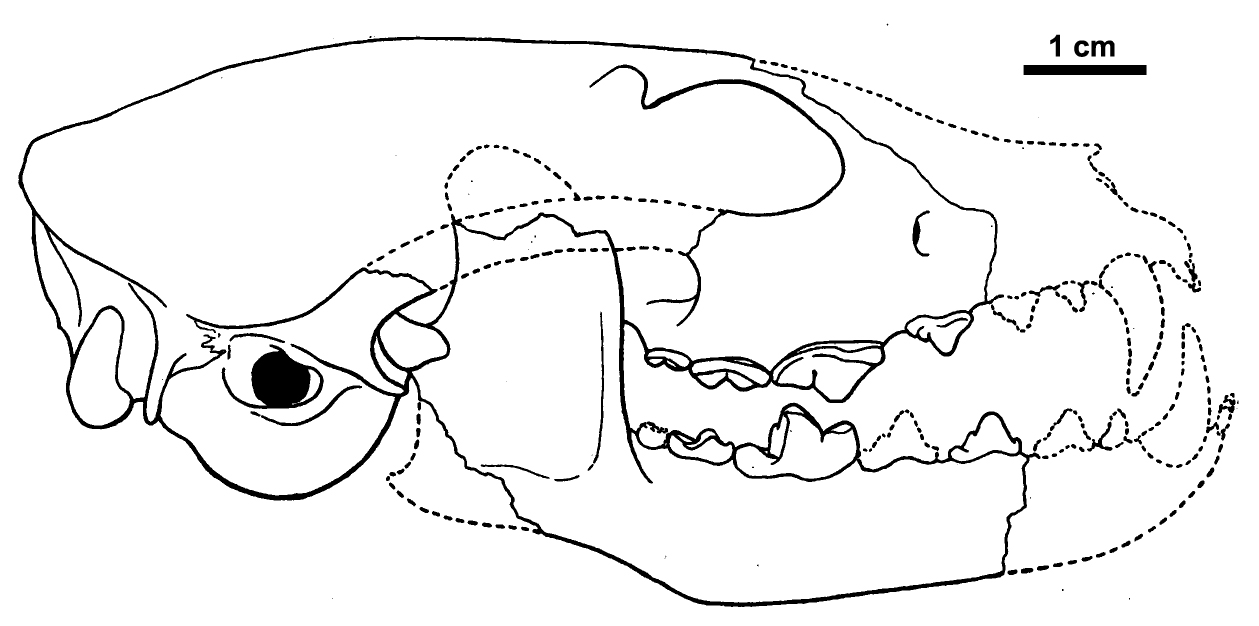
- Illustration of a fossilized skull of the Oligocene-Miocene dog Leptocyon
  †Leptocyon
  - †Leptocyon vafer
- Lepus
  - †Lepus californicus – or unidentified comparable form
- †Longirostromeryx
- Lontra
  - †Lontra canadensis
- Lymnaea
  - †Lymnaea caperota
  - †Lymnaea humulus
  - †Lymnaea parva
- Lynx

== M ==
- †Machairodus
  - †Machairodus catocopis
- Macrochelys
  - †Macrochelys temminckii
- †Macrognathomys
- †Mammut
  - †Mammut americanum
- †Mammuthus
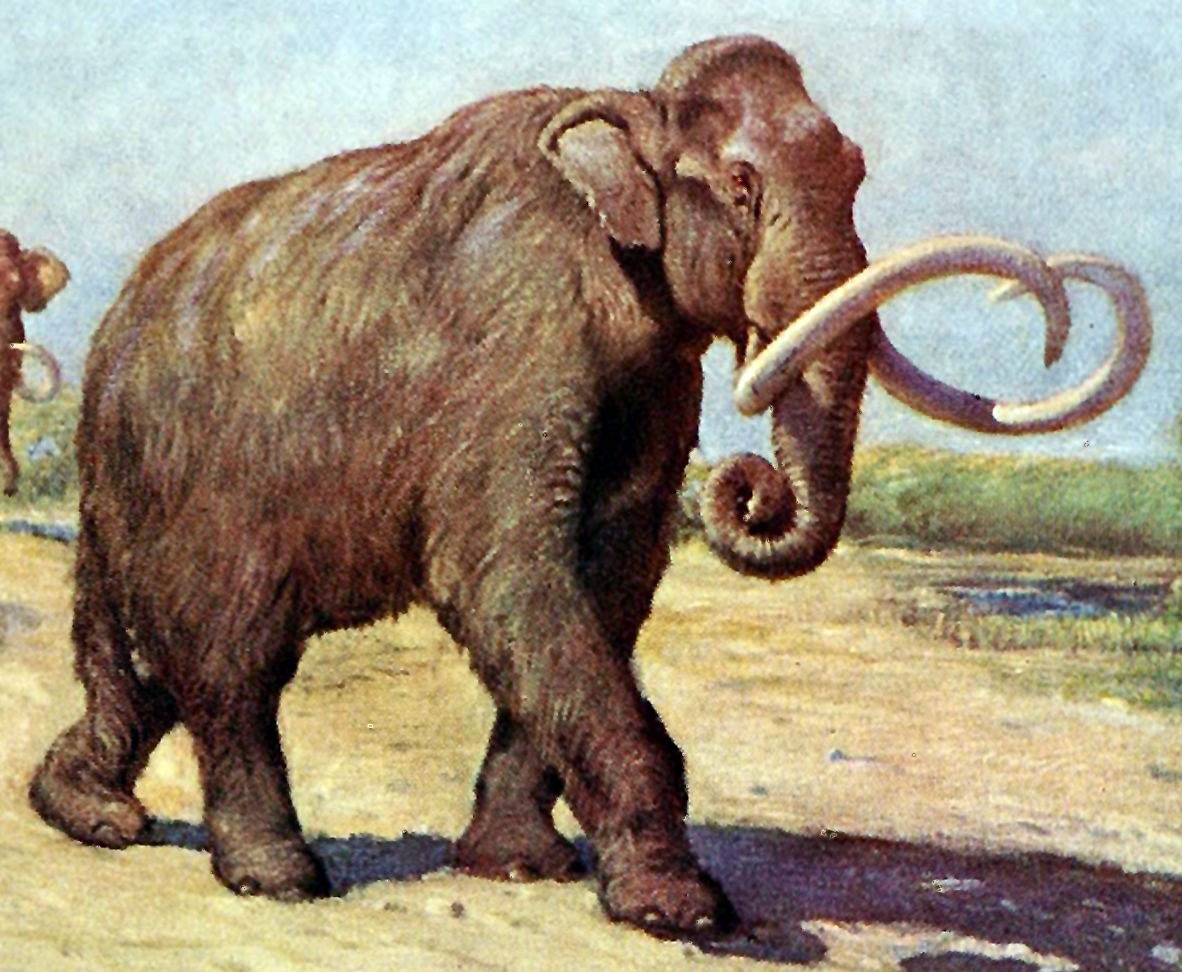
  - Life restoration of a herd of Mammuthus columbi, or Columbian mammoths. The extent of the fur depicted is hypothetical. Charles R. Knight (1909).
    †Mammuthus columbi
- Martes
  - †Martes foxi – type locality for species
  - †Martes stirtoni – type locality for species
- †Martinogale
  - †Martinogale alveodens
- †Megalonyx
  - †Megalonyx jeffersonii
  - †Megalonyx leptostomus
- †Megantereon
  - †Megantereon hesperus
- †Megatylopus
  - †Megatylopus cochrani
  - †Megatylopus gigas
  - †Megatylopus matthewi
- †Menetus
  - †Menetus exacuous
- Mephitis
  - †Mephitis mephitis – tentative report
  - †Mephitis rexroadensis – type locality for species
- †Merychyus
  - †Merychyus novomexicanus
- Micropterus
  - †Micropterus punctulatus – or unidentified comparable form
- Microtus
  - †Microtus llanensis
  - †Microtus meadensis
  - †Microtus ochrogaster
  - †Microtus paroperarius – type locality for species
  - †Microtus pennsylvanicus
- Mictomys
  - †Mictomys borealis
  - †Mictomys kansasensis
  - †Mictomys meltoni
  - †Mictomys vetus
- †Minytrema – tentative report
- †Mionictis
- Musculium
  - †Musculium partineium
  - †Musculium transversum
- Mustela
  - †Mustela meltoni – type locality for species
  - †Mustela rexroadensis – type locality for species
  - †Mustela richardsonii – or unidentified comparable form
- †Mylagaulus
  - †Mylagaulus sesquipedalis – type locality for species
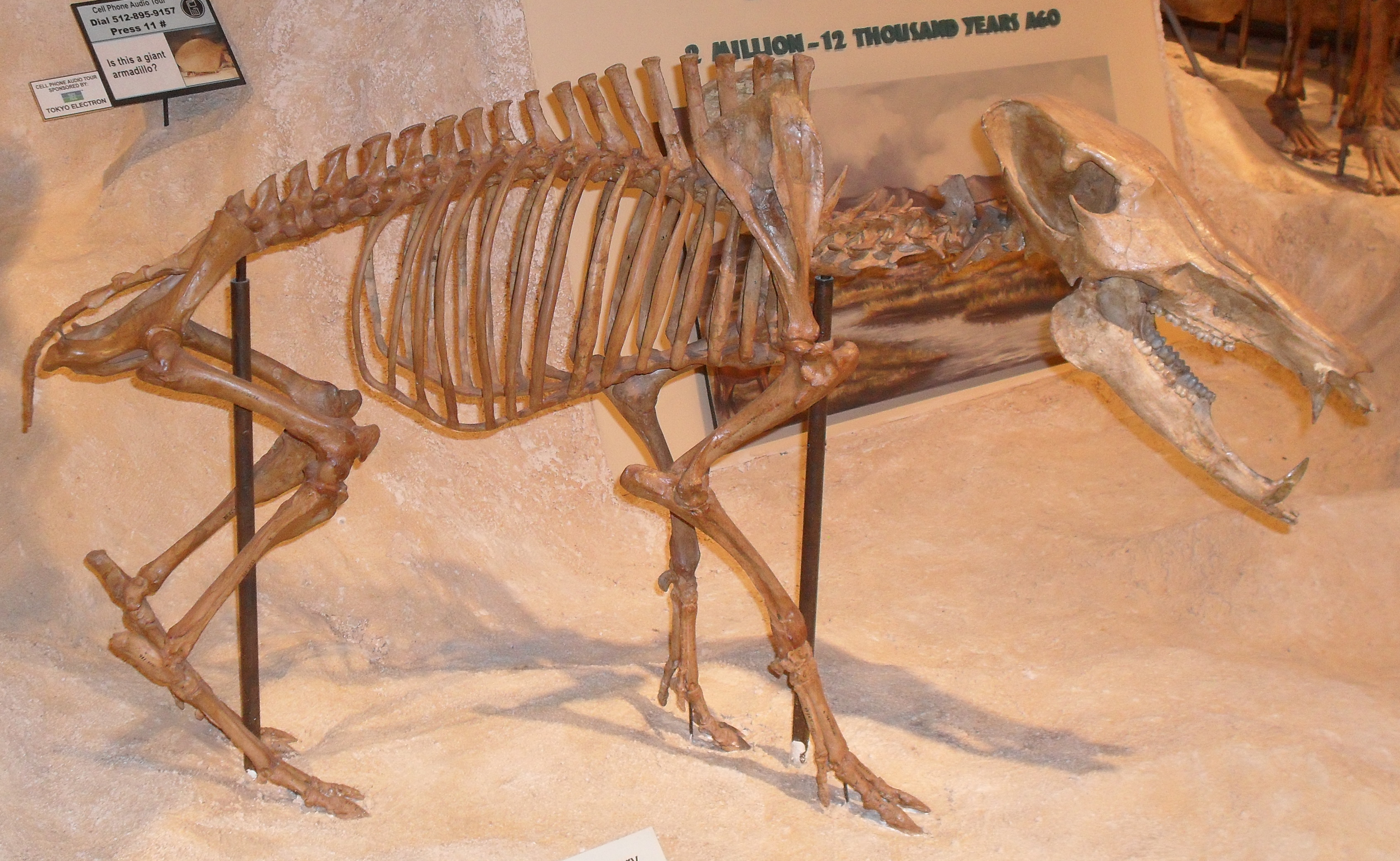
- Fossilized skeleton of the Pliocene-Holocene peccary Mylohyus
  †Mylohyus
  - †Mylohyus fossilis
- Myotis

== N ==
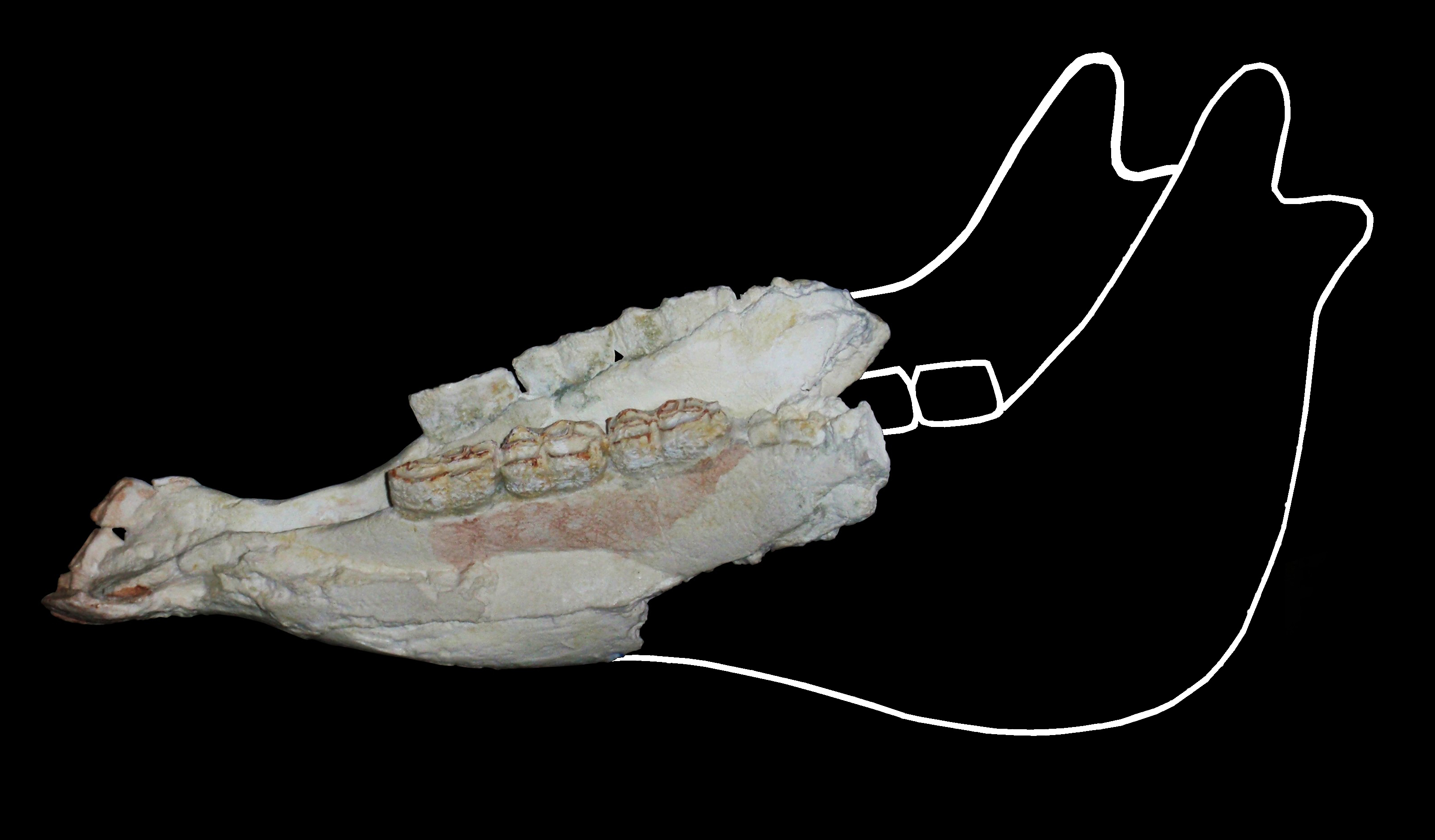
- Partial fossilized mandible of the Miocene-Pliocene horse Nannippus
  †Nannippus
  - †Nannippus lenticularis
  - †Nannippus peninsulatus
- †Nassella
  - †Nassella pohlii
  - †Nassella reynoldsii
- †Nebraskomys
  - †Nebraskomys mcgrewi
  - †Nebraskomys rexroadensis
- †Nekrolagus
  - †Nekrolagus progressus – type locality for species
- Neofiber
  - †Neofiber leonardi – type locality for species
- Neogale
  - †Neogale frenata – or unidentified comparable form
  - †Neogale vison
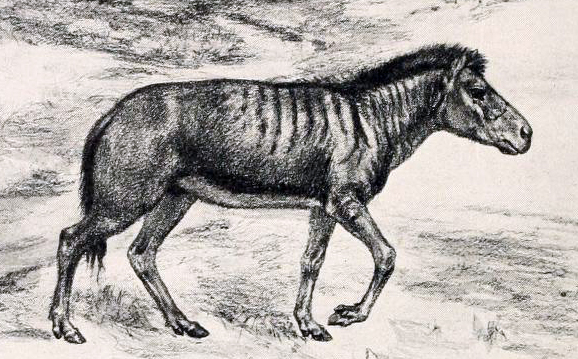
- Life restoration of a herd of Neohipparion. Robert Bruce Horsfall (1913).
  †Neohipparion
  - †Neohipparion affine – or unidentified comparable form
  - †Neohipparion eurystyle
  - †Neohipparion leptode
  - †Neohipparion trampasense
- Neotoma
  - †Neotoma floridana – or unidentified comparable form
  - †Neotoma leucopetrica
  - †Neotoma micropus
  - †Neotoma quadriplicata – type locality for species
  - †Neotoma sawrockensis – type locality for species
  - †Neotoma taylori – type locality for species
- Nerodia
  - †Nerodia hillmani
  - †Nerodia sipedon
- †Nerterogeomys
  - †Nerterogeomys smithi
- Nesovitrea
  - †Nesovitrea electrina
- Nettion
  - †Nettion ogallalae – type locality for species
- †Nimravides
  - †Nimravides thinobates
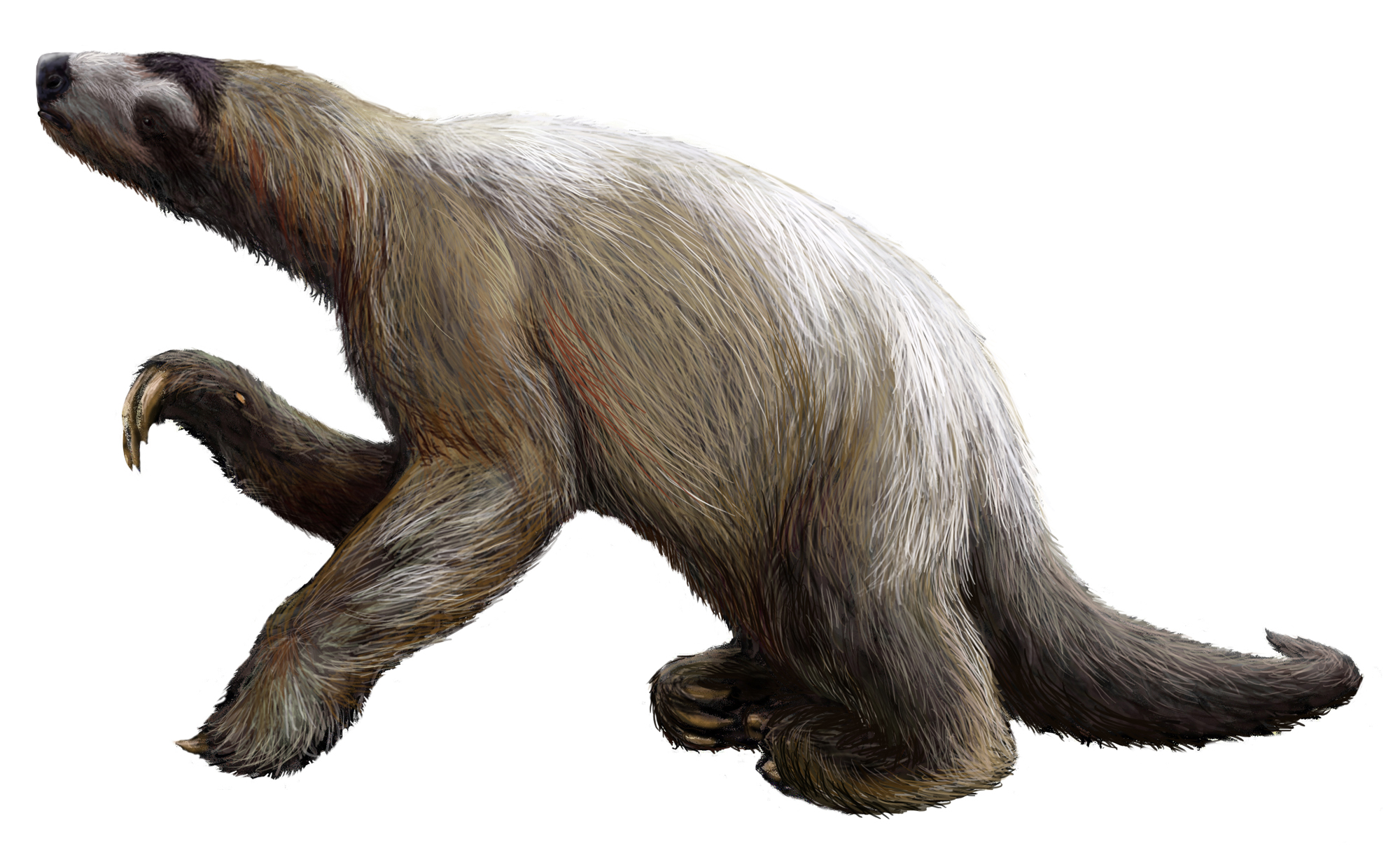
- Life restoration of the Pleistocene ground sloth Nothrotheriops
  †Nothrotheriops
  - †Nothrotheriops texanus
- Notiosorex
  - †Notiosorex crawfordi
  - †Notiosorex jacksoni – type locality for species
- †Notolagus
  - †Notolagus lepusculus – type locality for species
- †Notropes
- †Notropis – tentative report

== O ==
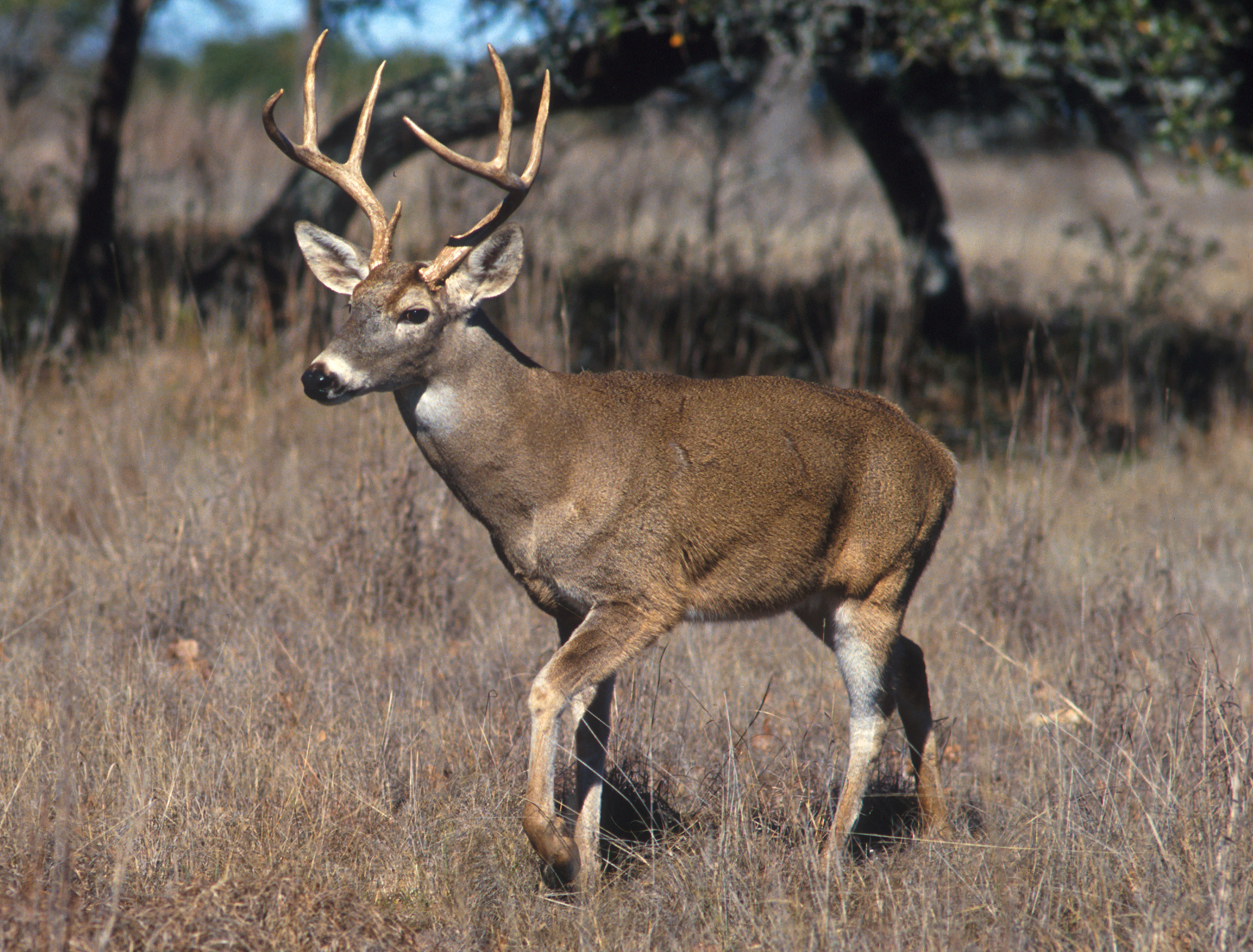
- A living Odocoileus deer
  Odocoileus
- Ogmodontomys
  - †Ogmodontomys poaphagus – type locality for species
  - †Ogmodontomys sawrockensis – type locality for species
- †Ogmophis
  - †Ogmophis pliocompactus – type locality for species
- Ondatra
  - †Ondatra annectens
  - †Ondatra idahoensis
  - †Ondatra meadensis
  - †Ondatra zibethicus
- Onychomys
  - †Onychomys gidleyi – type locality for species
  - †Onychomys hollisteri – type locality for species
  - †Onychomys leucogaster – or unidentified comparable form
  - †Onychomys martini
  - †Onychomys pedroensis
- Ophisaurus
  - †Ophisaurus attenuatus
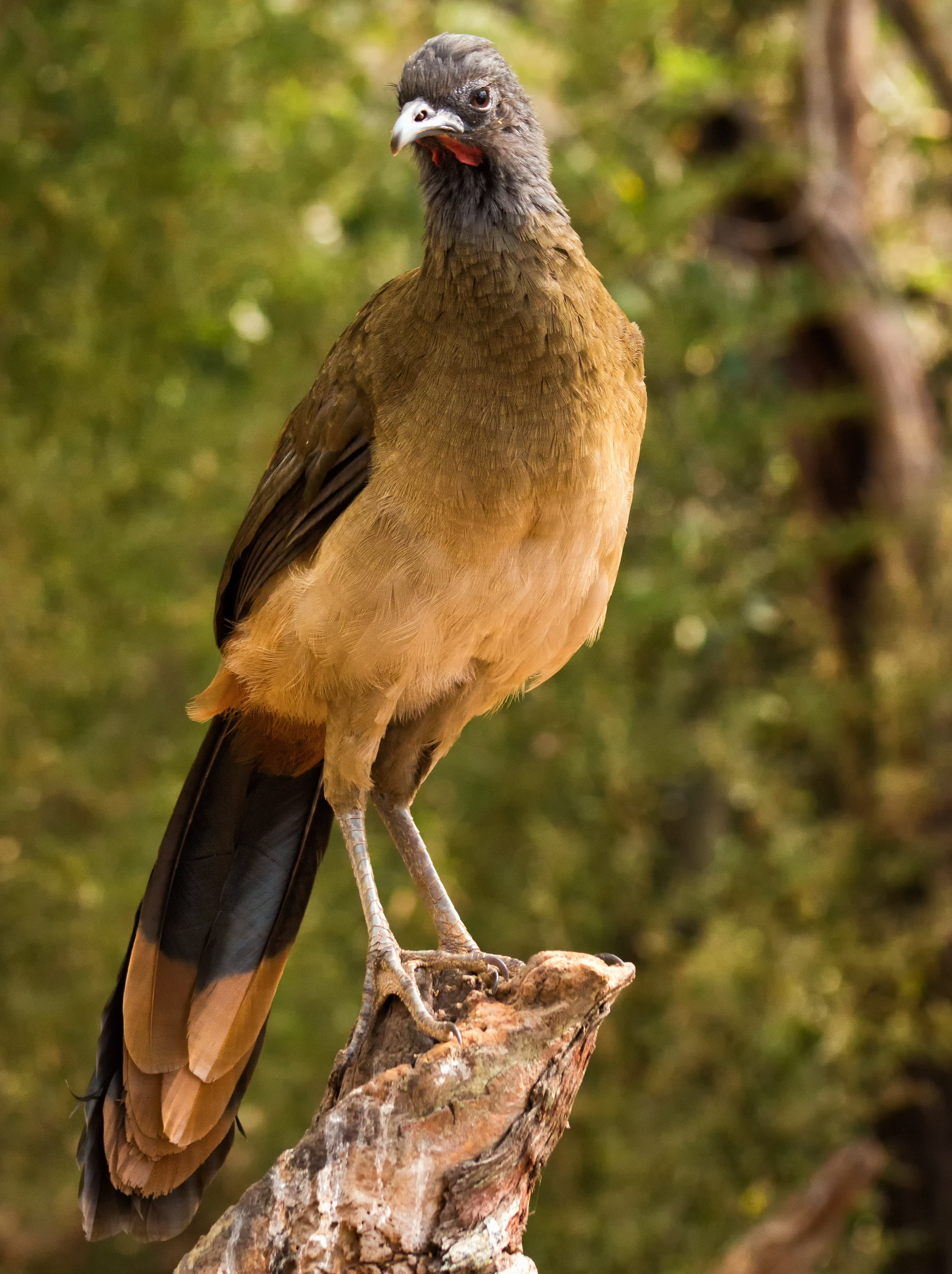
- A living Ortalis, or chachalaca
  Ortalis
  - †Ortalis affinis – type locality for species
- Oryzomys
  - †Oryzomys palustris

== P ==
- †Paenemarmota
  - †Paenemarmota barbouri
  - †Paenemarmota sawrockensis
- †Paleoheterodon
- †Panicum
  - †Panicum elegans
- Panthera
  - †Panthera leo
- †Paracryptotis
  - †Paracryptotis rex – type locality for species
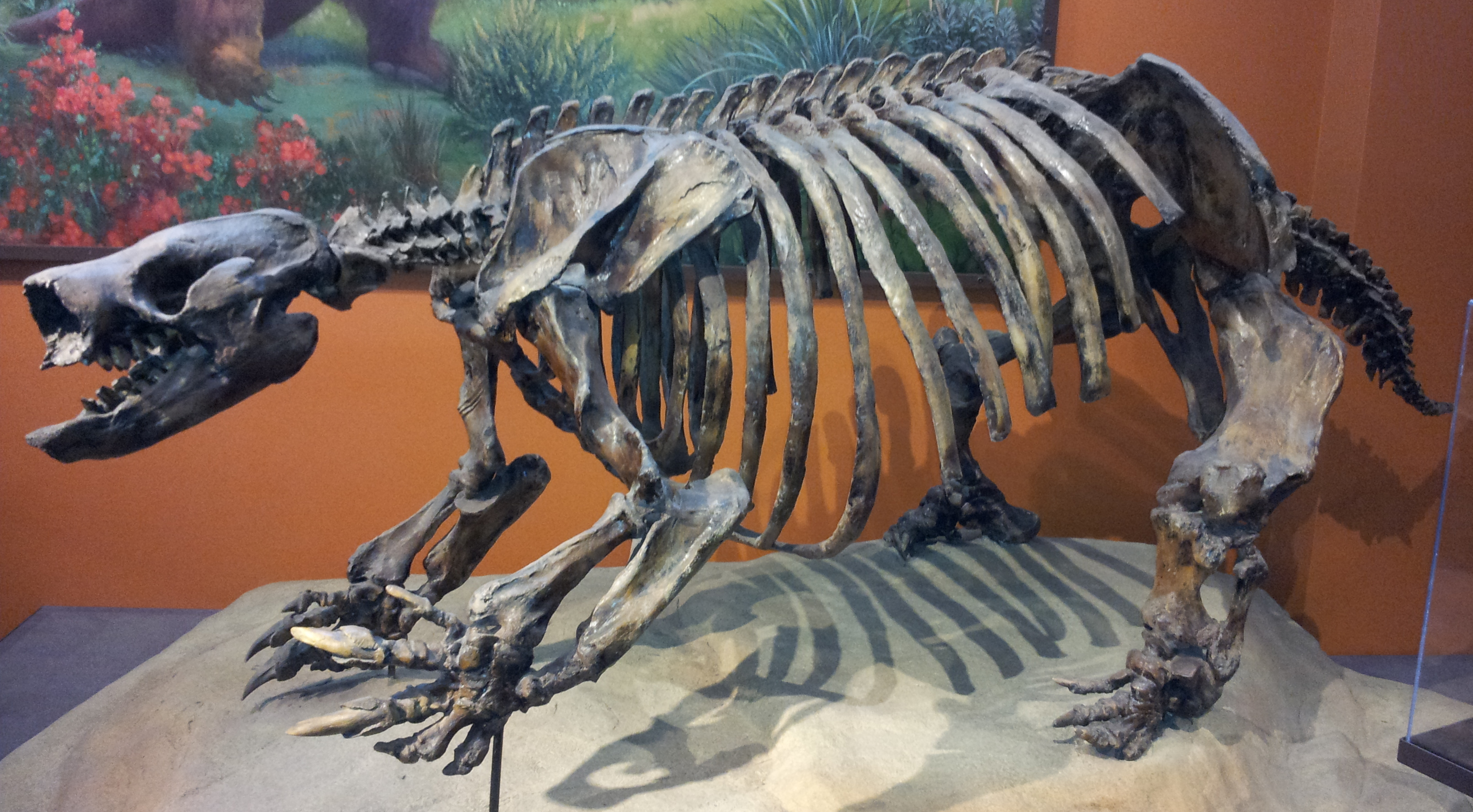
- Fossilized skeleton of the Pliocene-Pleistocene ground sloth Paramylodon
  †Paramylodon
  - †Paramylodon harlani
- †Paranasua – or unidentified comparable form
- †Parapliosaccomys
  - †Parapliosaccomys hibbardi
- †Pediomeryx
  - †Pediomeryx hemphillensis
- †Peraceras
- Perca
  - †Perca flavescens
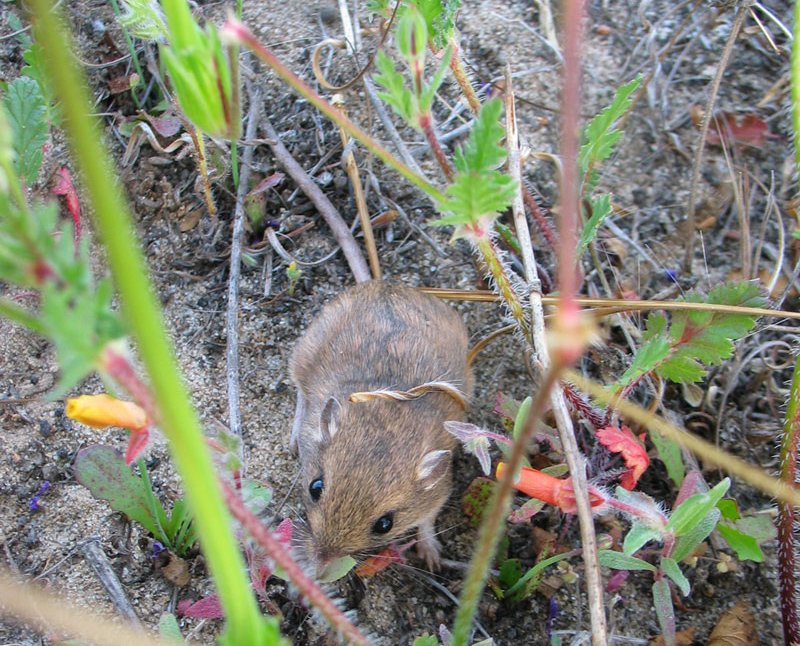
- A living Perognathus pocket mouse
  Perognathus
  - †Perognathus coquorum – or unidentified comparable form
  - †Perognathus dunklei – type locality for species
  - †Perognathus gidleyi
  - †Perognathus mclaughlini – type locality for species
  - †Perognathus pearlettensis – type locality for species
  - †Perognathus rexroadensis – type locality for species
- Peromyscus
  - †Peromyscus baumgartneri – type locality for species
  - †Peromyscus berendsensis
  - †Peromyscus cochrani – type locality for species
  - †Peromyscus cragini
  - †Peromyscus kansasensis – type locality for species
  - †Peromyscus progressus – type locality for species
- †Petenyia
  - †Petenyia concisa
- Phenacomys
  - †Phenacomys intermedius – or unidentified comparable form
- Phrynosoma
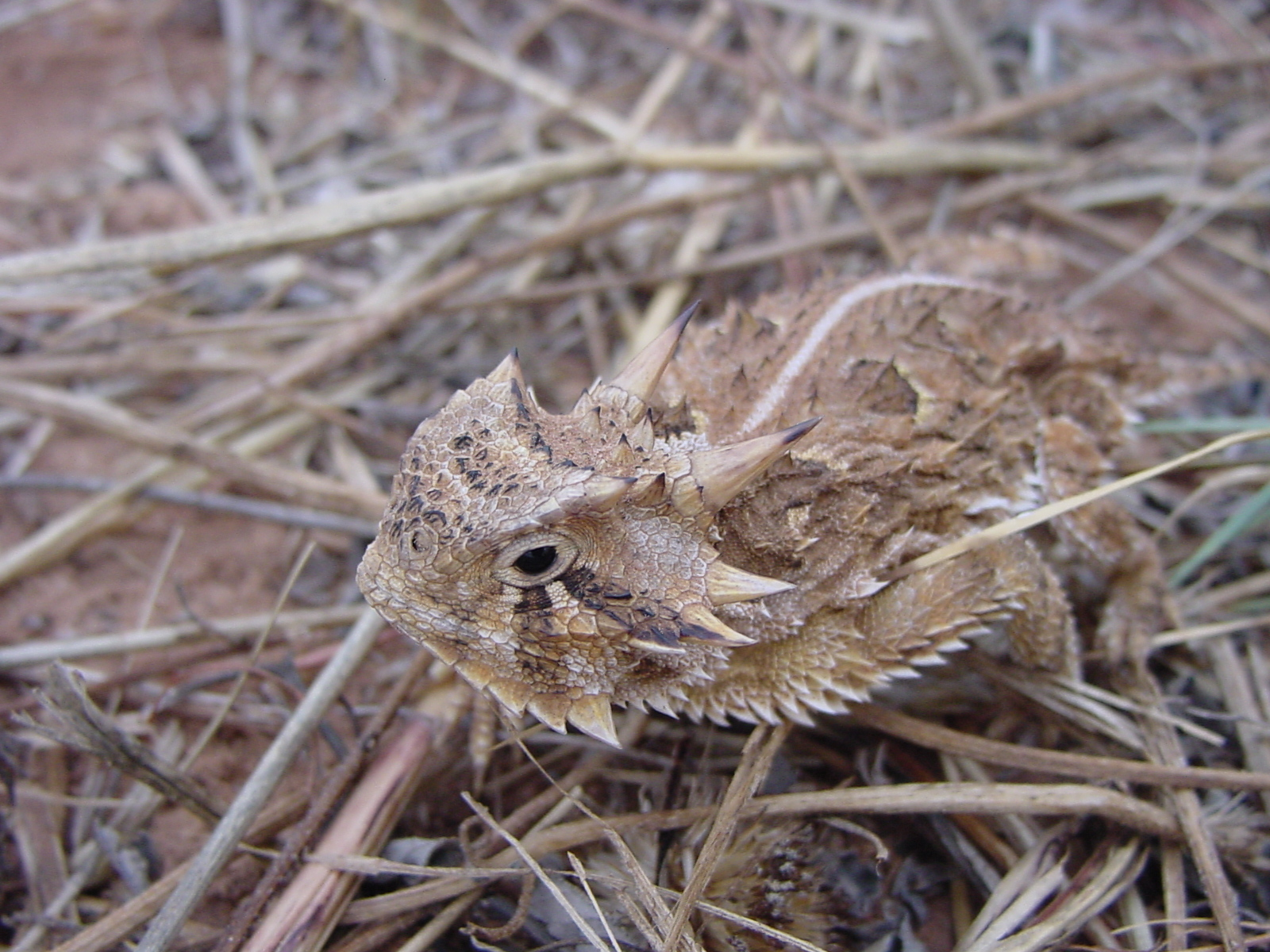
  - A living Phrynosoma cornutum, or Texas horned lizard
    †Phrynosoma cornutum
- Physa
  - †Physa anatina
  - †Physa arboreus
  - †Physa gyrina
  - †Physa hawni
- Pisidium
  - †Pisidium abditum
  - †Pisidium compressum
  - †Pisidium noveboracense
- Pituophis
  - †Pituophis catenifer
  - †Pituophis melanoleucus
- †Planisorex
  - †Planisorex dixonensis
- †Planorbula
  - †Planorbula campestris
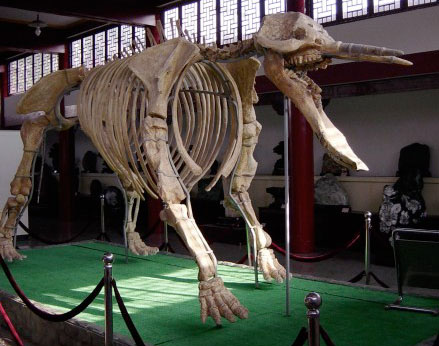
- Mounted fossilized skeleton of the Miocene elephant relative Platybelodon
  †Platybelodon
  - †Platybelodon loomisi
- †Platygonus
  - †Platygonus bicalcaratus
  - †Platygonus compressus – or unidentified comparable form
  - †Platygonus pollenae
  - †Platygonus vetus – or unidentified comparable form
- Plegadis – or unidentified comparable form
- †Pleiolama
  - †Pleiolama vera – type locality for species
- †Plesiogulo
  - †Plesiogulo marshalli – type locality for species
- †Plioctomys
  - †Plioctomys rinkeri
- †Pliogyps – type locality for genus
  - †Pliogyps fisheri – type locality for species
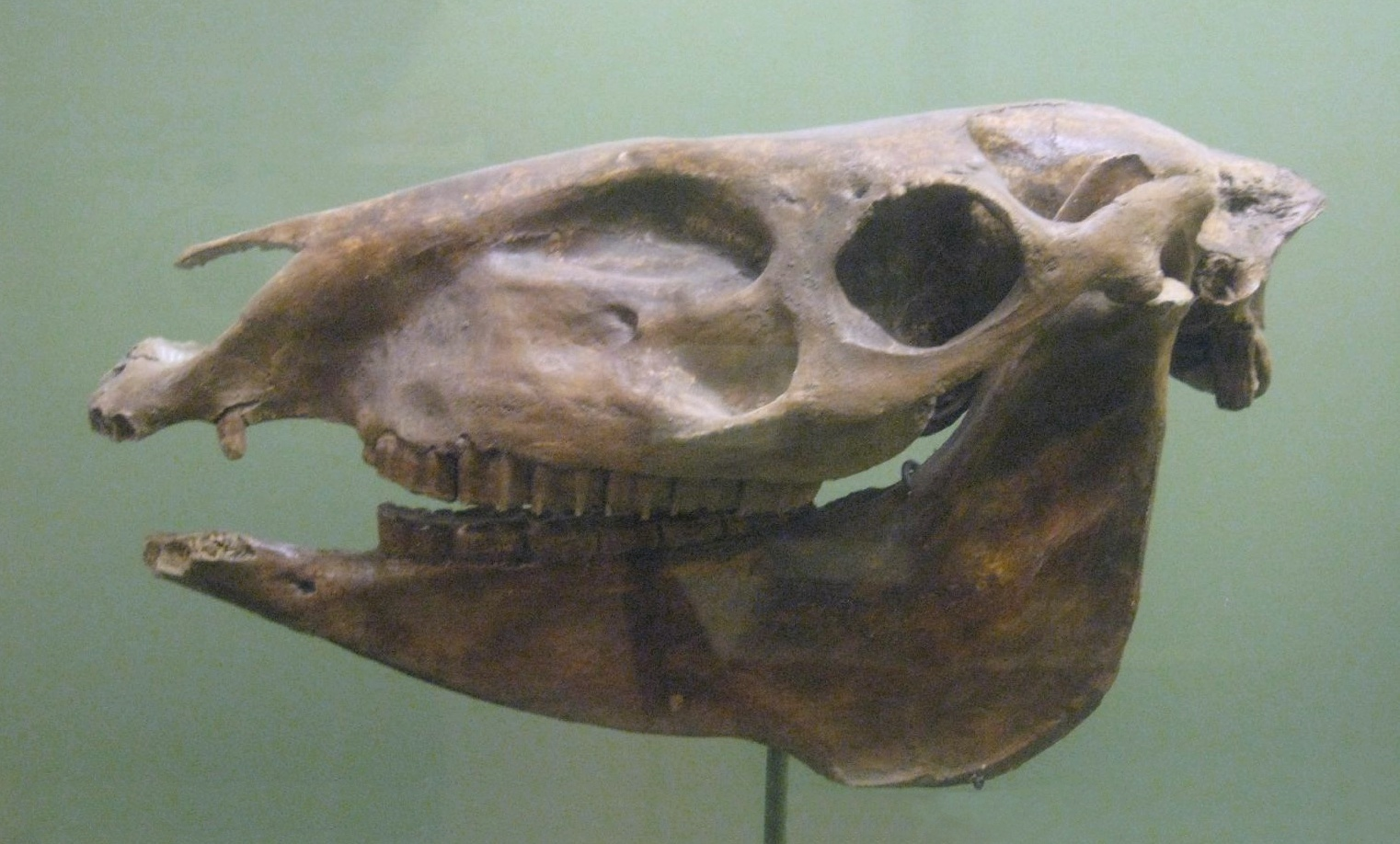
- Fossilized skull of the Miocene horse Pliohippus
  †Pliohippus
  - †Pliohippus nobilis – type locality for species
  - †Pliohippus pernix
- †Pliolemmus
  - †Pliolemmus antiquus – type locality for species
- †Pliophenacomys
  - †Pliophenacomys dixonensis – type locality for species
  - †Pliophenacomys finneyi
  - †Pliophenacomys meadensis
  - †Pliophenacomys osborni
  - †Pliophenacomys primaevus – type locality for species
- †Pliopicus – type locality for genus
  - †Pliopicus brodkorbi – type locality for species
- †Pliotaxidea
  - †Pliotaxidea nevadensis
- †Pomoxis
- †Potamocypris
- †Pratifelis
  - †Pratifelis martini – type locality for species
- †Pratilepus
  - †Pratilepus kansasensis – type locality for species
- †Procamelus
- †Procastoroides
  - †Procastoroides sweeti
- Procyon
  - †Procyon lotor
  - †Procyon rexroadensis – type locality for species
- †Prodipodomys
  - †Prodipodomys centralis
  - †Prodipodomys griggsorum
  - †Prodipodomys kansensis
  - †Prodipodomys tiheni
- †Prodipoides
  - †Prodipoides phillisi – type locality for species
- †Prolappula
  - †Prolappula verrucosa
- †Prolithospermum
  - †Prolithospermum johnstonii
- †Prosthennops
  - †Prosthennops serus – type locality for species
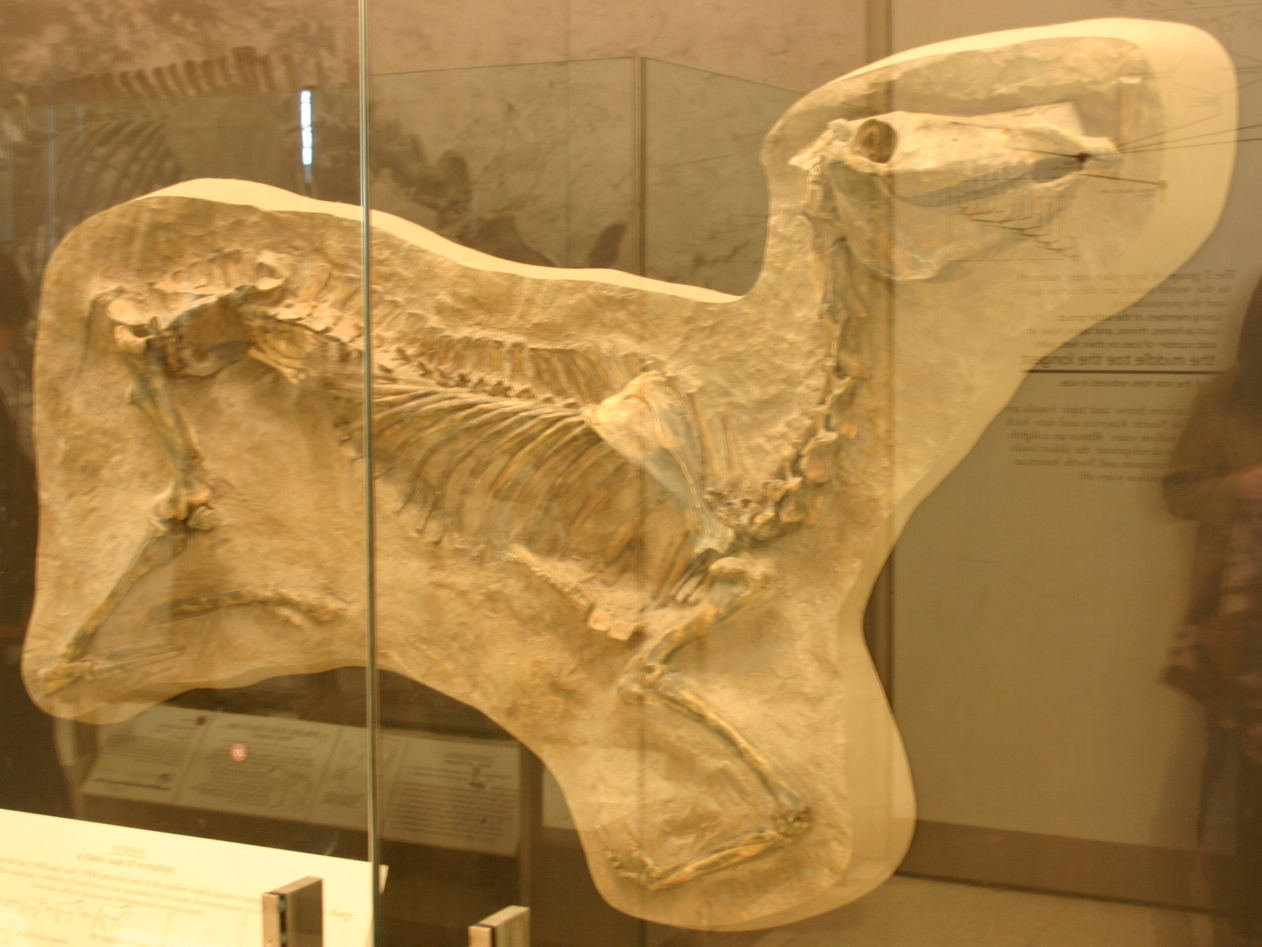
- Fossilized skeleton of the Miocene horse Protohippus
  †Protohippus
  - †Protohippus gidleyi
  - †Protohippus supremus
- †Protolabis
- Pseudacris
  - †Pseudacris clarki – or unidentified comparable form
  - †Pseudacris triseriata
- Pseudemys
  - †Pseudemys hibbardi
- †Pseudhipparion
- †Pseudoceras
  - †Pseudoceras skinneri
- Puma
  - †Puma concolor
- Pupilla
  - †Pupilla sinistra
- Pupoides
  - †Pupoides marginatus

== R ==
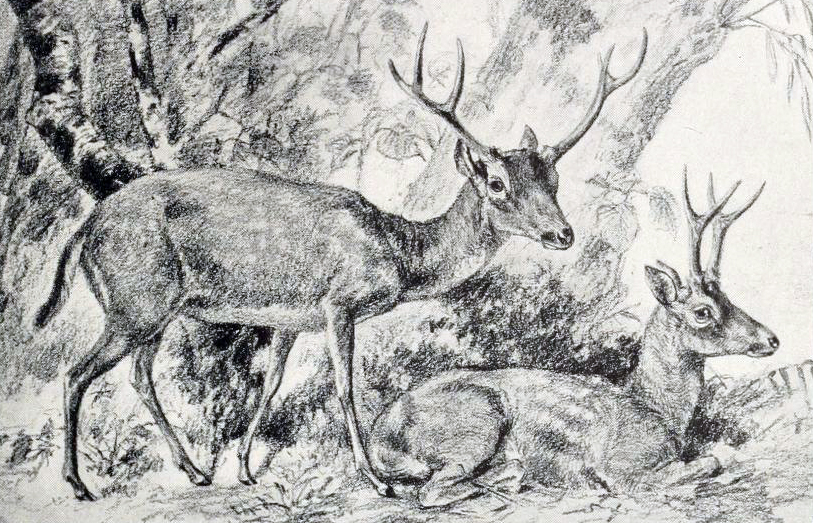
- Life restoration of the Miocene-Pliocene pronghorn Ramoceros and Cosoryx. Robert Bruce Horsfall (1913).
  †Ramoceros
  - †Ramoceros osborni
- †Rana
  - †Rana areolata – or unidentified comparable form
  - †Rana bucella
  - †Rana catesbeiana
  - †Rana fayeae
  - †Rana parvissima
  - †Rana pipiens
  - †Rana rexroadensis
- †Regina
  - †Regina grahami
- Reithrodontomys
  - †Reithrodontomys humulis
  - †Reithrodontomys megalotis
  - †Reithrodontomys montanus – or unidentified comparable form
  - †Reithrodontomys moorei
  - †Reithrodontomys pratincola – type locality for species
  - †Reithrodontomys rexroadensis – type locality for species
  - †Reithrodontomys wetmorei – type locality for species
- Rhinocheilus – tentative report
  - †Rhinocheilus lecontei
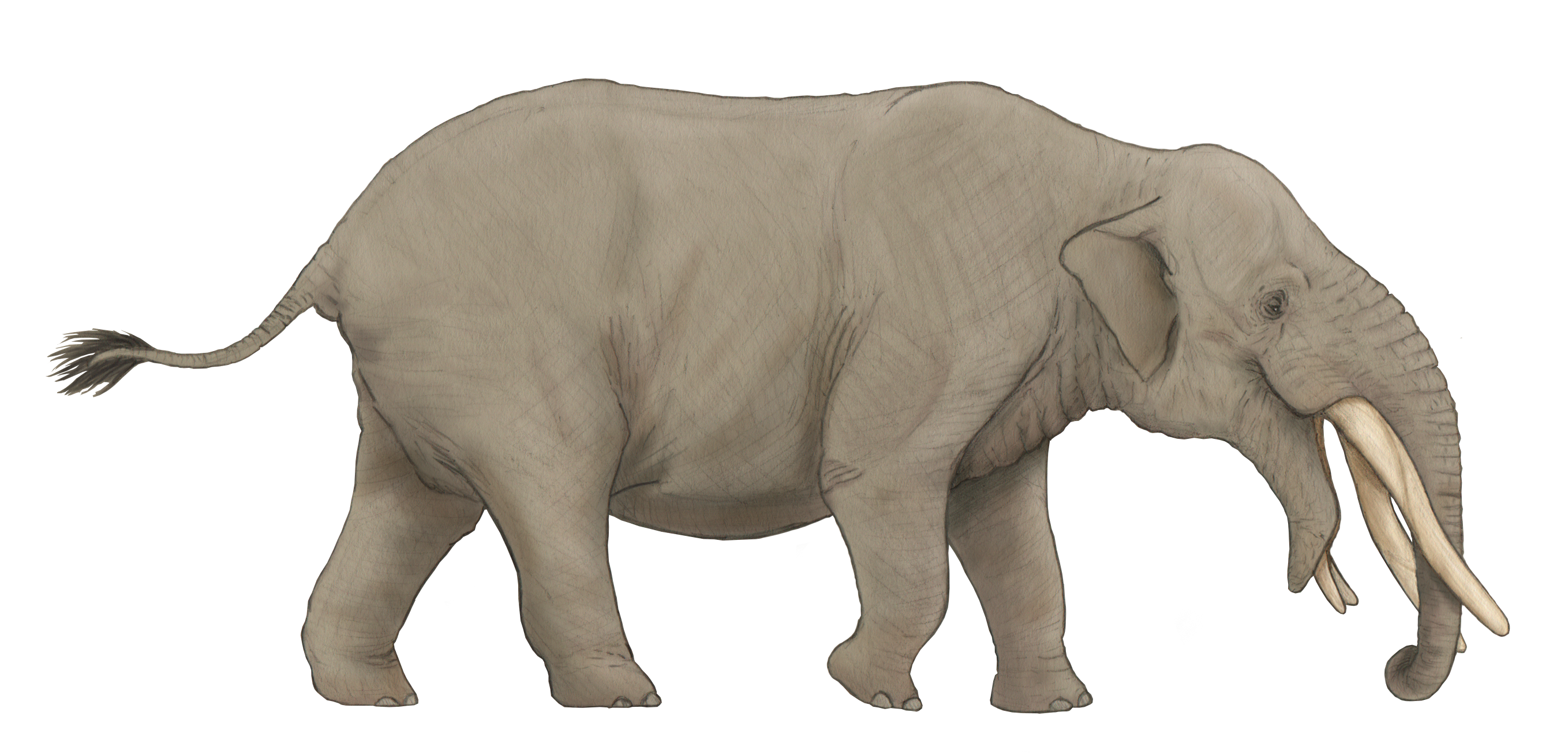
- Restoration of the Miocene-Pliocene elephant relative Rhynchotherium
  †Rhynchotherium

== S ==
- †Satherium
  - †Satherium piscinarium
- Scalopus
  - †Scalopus aquaticus
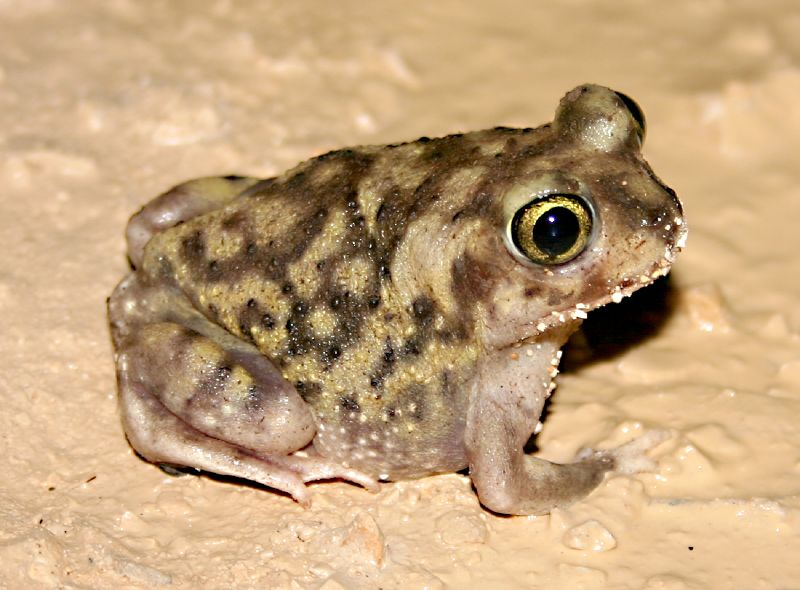
- A living Scaphiopus, or North American spadefoot toad
  Scaphiopus
  - †Scaphiopus hardeni
- Sceloporus
  - †Sceloporus robustus – type locality for species
  - †Sceloporus undulatus
- †Semotilus
  - †Semotilus atromaculatus – or unidentified comparable form
- Sigmodon
  - †Sigmodon curtisi – or unidentified comparable form
  - †Sigmodon minor
- Sistrurus
  - †Sistrurus catenatus
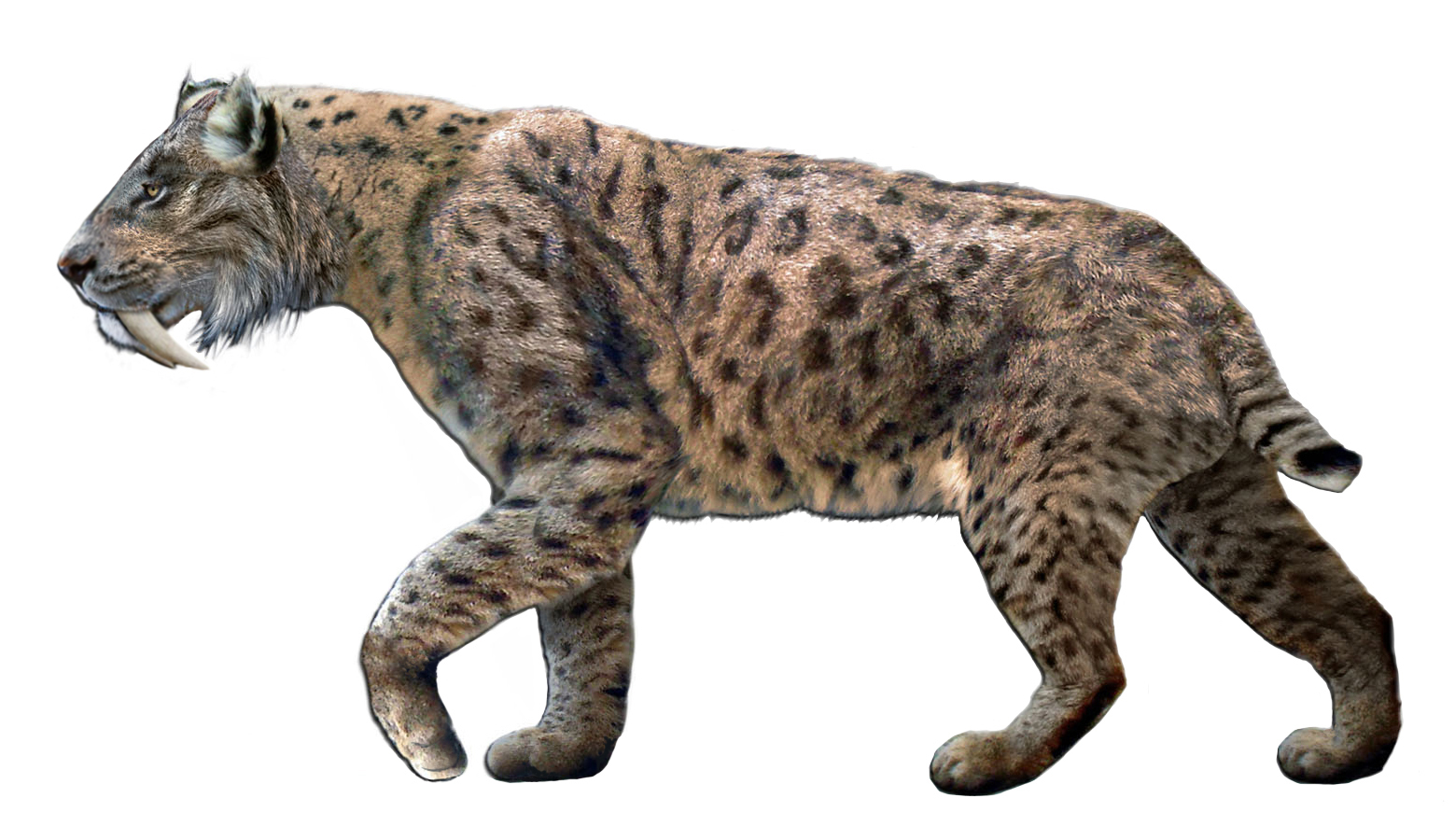
- Life restoration of the Pleistocene-Holocene saber-tooth cat Smilodon
  †Smilodon
- †Soergelia
  - †Soergelia mayfieldi – or unidentified comparable form
- Sorex
  - †Sorex arcticus
  - †Sorex cinereus
  - †Sorex cudahyensis
  - †Sorex kansasensis – type locality for species
  - †Sorex lacustris
  - †Sorex leahyi – type locality for species
  - †Sorex megapalustris
  - †Sorex palustris
  - †Sorex pratensis
  - †Sorex rexroadensis – type locality for species
  - †Sorex sandersi – type locality for species
  - †Sorex scottensis – type locality for species
  - †Sorex taylori – type locality for species
- Spea
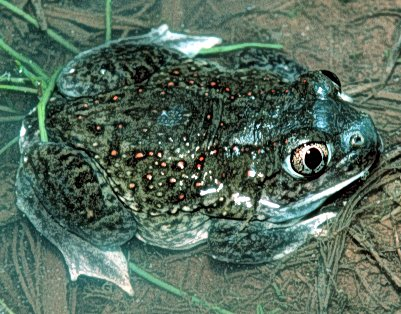
  - A living Spea bombifrons, or plains spadefoot toad
    †Spea bombifrons
  - †Spea diversus
- Spermophilus
  - †Spermophilus boothi
  - †Spermophilus cragini – type locality for species
  - †Spermophilus franklinii – or unidentified comparable form
  - †Spermophilus fricki
  - †Spermophilus howelli – type locality for species
  - †Spermophilus lorisrusselli – type locality for species
  - †Spermophilus meadensis – type locality for species
  - †Spermophilus rexroadensis – type locality for species
  - †Spermophilus richardsonii
  - †Spermophilus tridecemlineatus
- Sphaerium
  - †Sphaerium simile
- Spilogale
  - †Spilogale putorius
  - †Spilogale rexroadi – type locality for species
- Stagnicola
  - †Stagnicola caperata
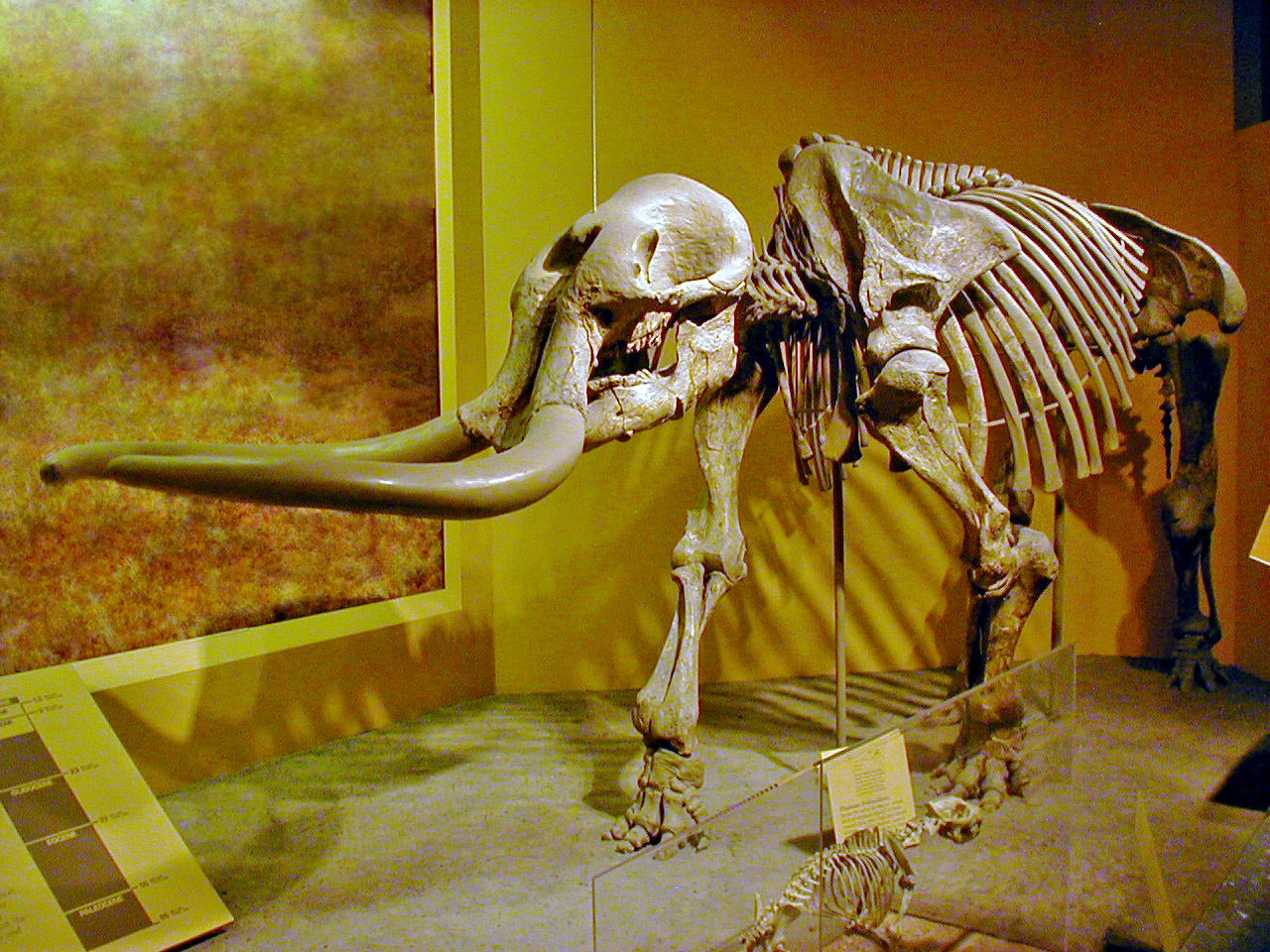
- Mounted fossilized skeleton of the Pliocene-Pleistocene elephant relative Stegomastodon
  †Stegomastodon
  - †Stegomastodon mirificus
  - †Stegomastodon primitivus
- †Stenotrema
  - †Stenotrema leai
- Sternotherus
  - †Sternotherus odoratus
- Storeria
  - †Storeria dekayi – or unidentified comparable form
- Succinea
  - †Succinea ovalis
- †Succinia
  - †Succinia concordalis
  - †Succinia haydeni
- Sylvilagus
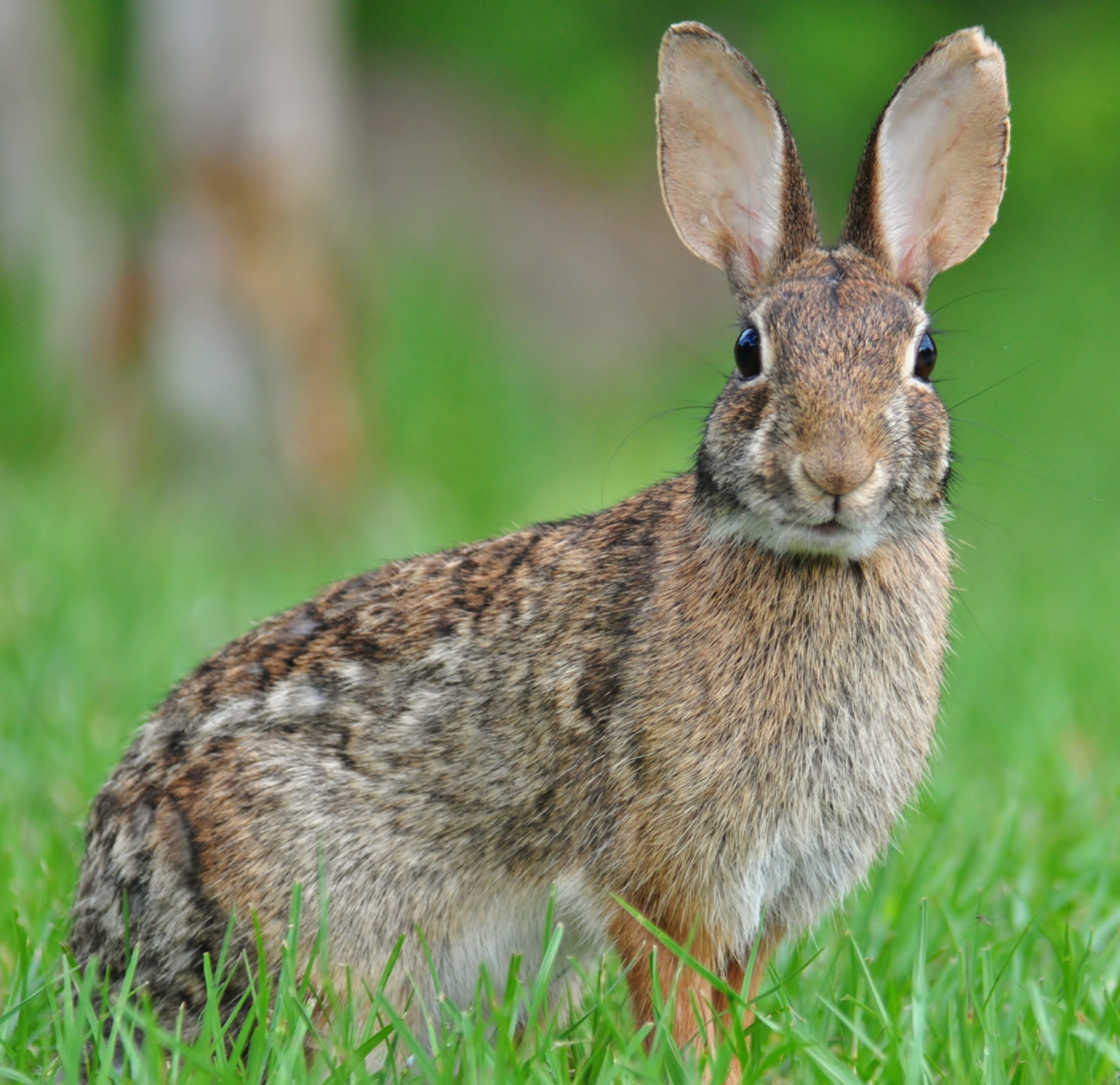
  - A living Sylvilagus floridanus, or eastern cottontail
    †Sylvilagus floridanus
- †Symmetrodontomys
  - †Symmetrodontomys simplicidens – type locality for species
- Synaptomys
  - †Synaptomys australis

== T ==
- Tapirus
  - †Tapirus veroensis
- Taxidea
  - †Taxidea taxus
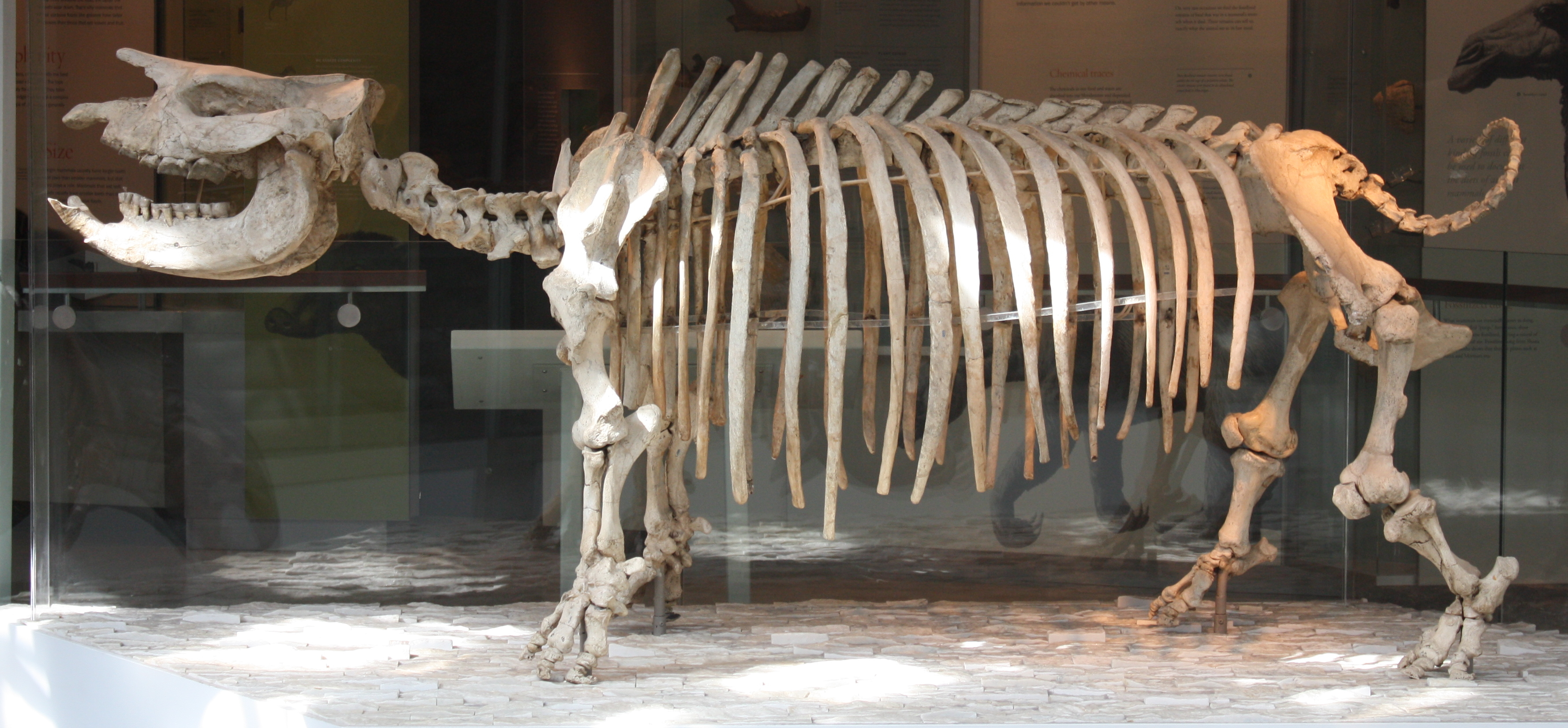
- Mounted fossilized skeleton of the Miocene-Pliocene rhinoceros Teleoceras
  †Teleoceras
  - †Teleoceras fossiger – type locality for species
  - †Teleoceras guymonense
- Terrapene
  - †Terrapene carolina
  - †Terrapene ilanensis
- †Texasophis
  - †Texasophis wilsoni – type locality for species
- †Texoceros
  - †Texoceros guymonensis – or unidentified comparable form
- Thamnophis
  - †Thamnophis proximus
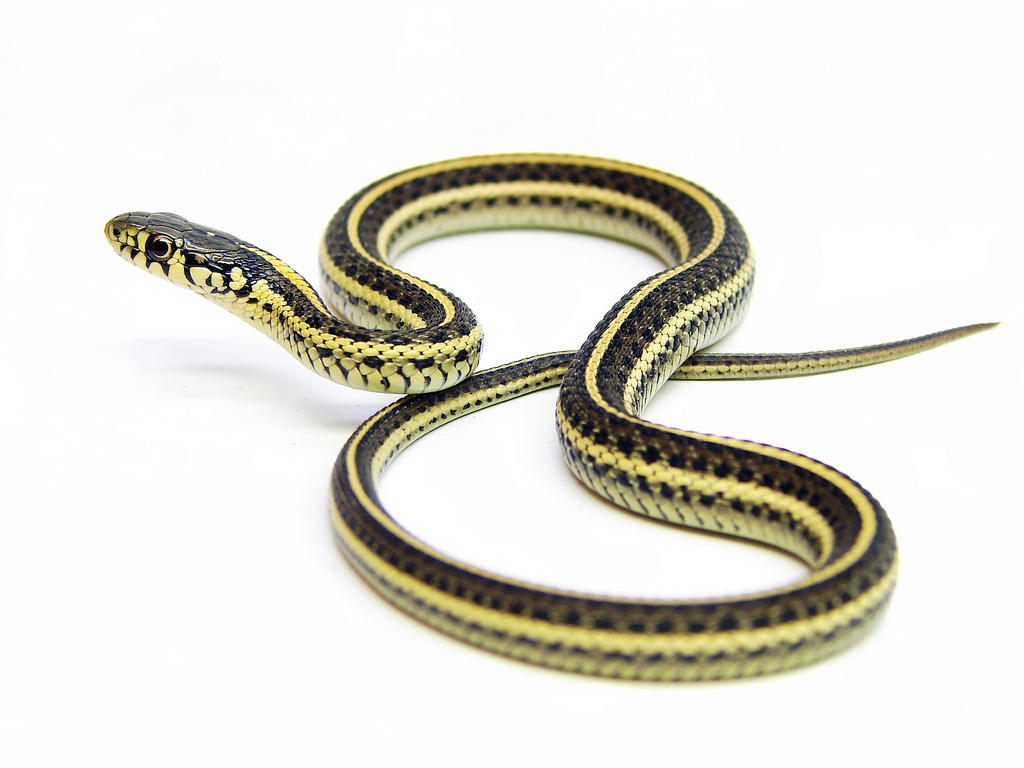
  - A living Thamnophis radix, or plains garter snake
    †Thamnophis radix
  - †Thamnophis saurita – or unidentified comparable form
  - †Thamnophis sirtalis
- Thomomys
  - †Thomomys talpoides
- Trachemys
  - †Trachemys scripta
- †Tregobatrachus – type locality for genus
  - †Tregobatrachus hibbardi – type locality for species
- †Tregophis – type locality for genus
  - †Tregophis brevirachis – type locality for species
- †Tregosorex
  - †Tregosorex holmani – type locality for species
- †Trigonictis
  - †Trigonictis macrodon
- Trionyx
  - †Trionyx spinifer
- Tropidoclonion
  - †Tropidoclonion lineatum
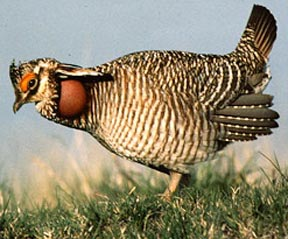
- A living Tympanuchus, or prairie chicken
  Tympanuchus – or unidentified comparable form

== U ==
- †Untermannerix
  - †Untermannerix copiosus
- Urocyon
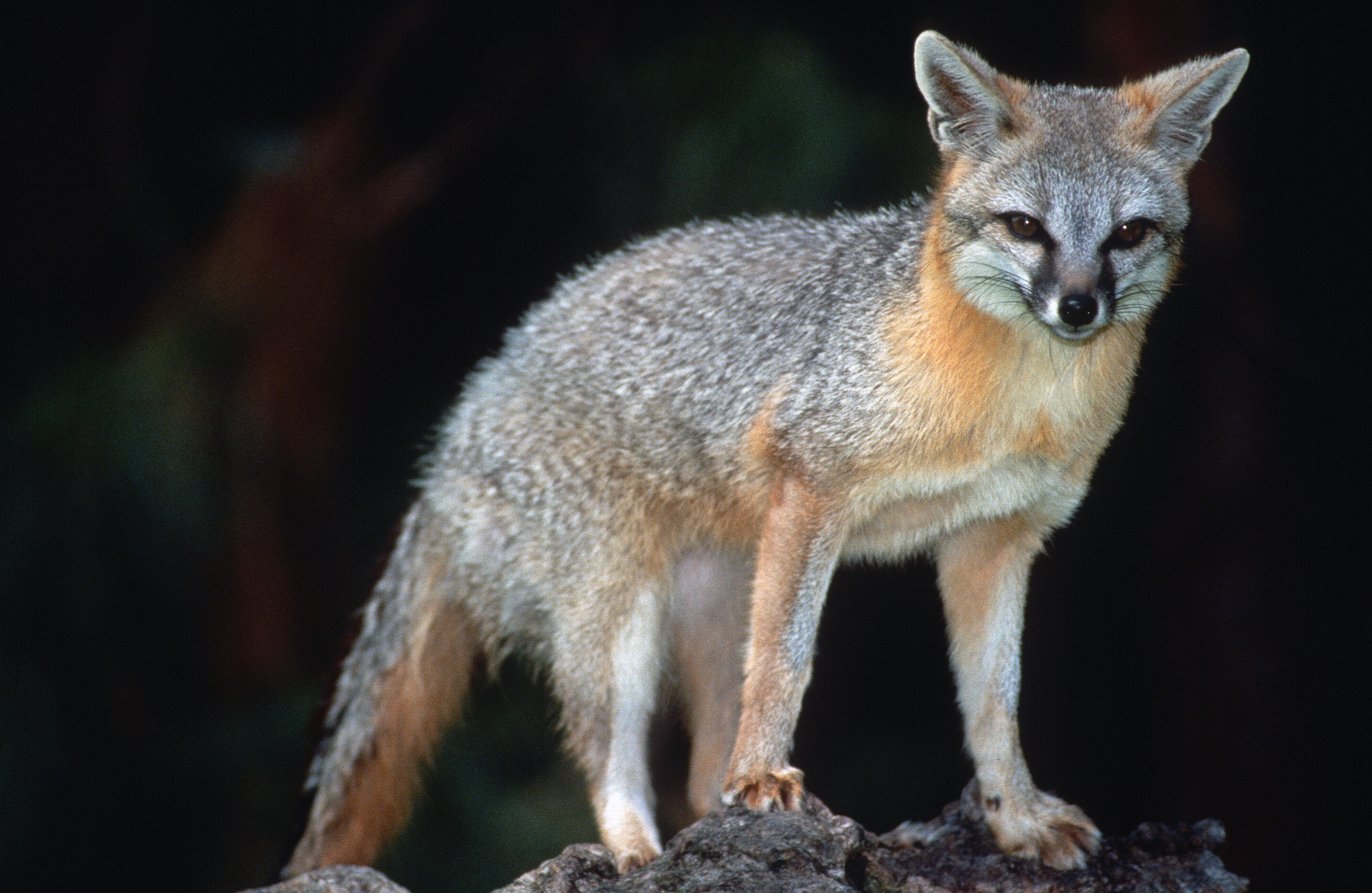
  - A living Urocyon cinereoargenteus, or gray fox
    †Urocyon cinereoargenteus
  - †Urocyon progressus
- †Ustatochoerus
  - †Ustatochoerus medius

== V ==
- Vallonia
  - †Vallonia gracilicosta
  - †Vallonia pulchella
- Valvata
  - †Valvata tricarinata
- Vertigo
  - †Vertigo ovata
- Vulpes
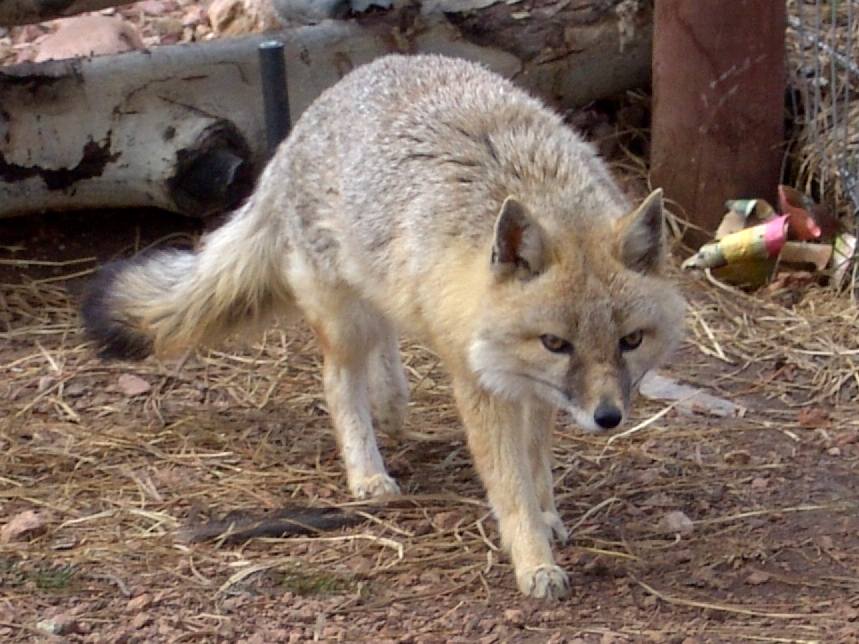
  - A living Vulpes velox, or swift fox
    †Vulpes velox

== Z ==
- Zapus
  - †Zapus burti – type locality for species
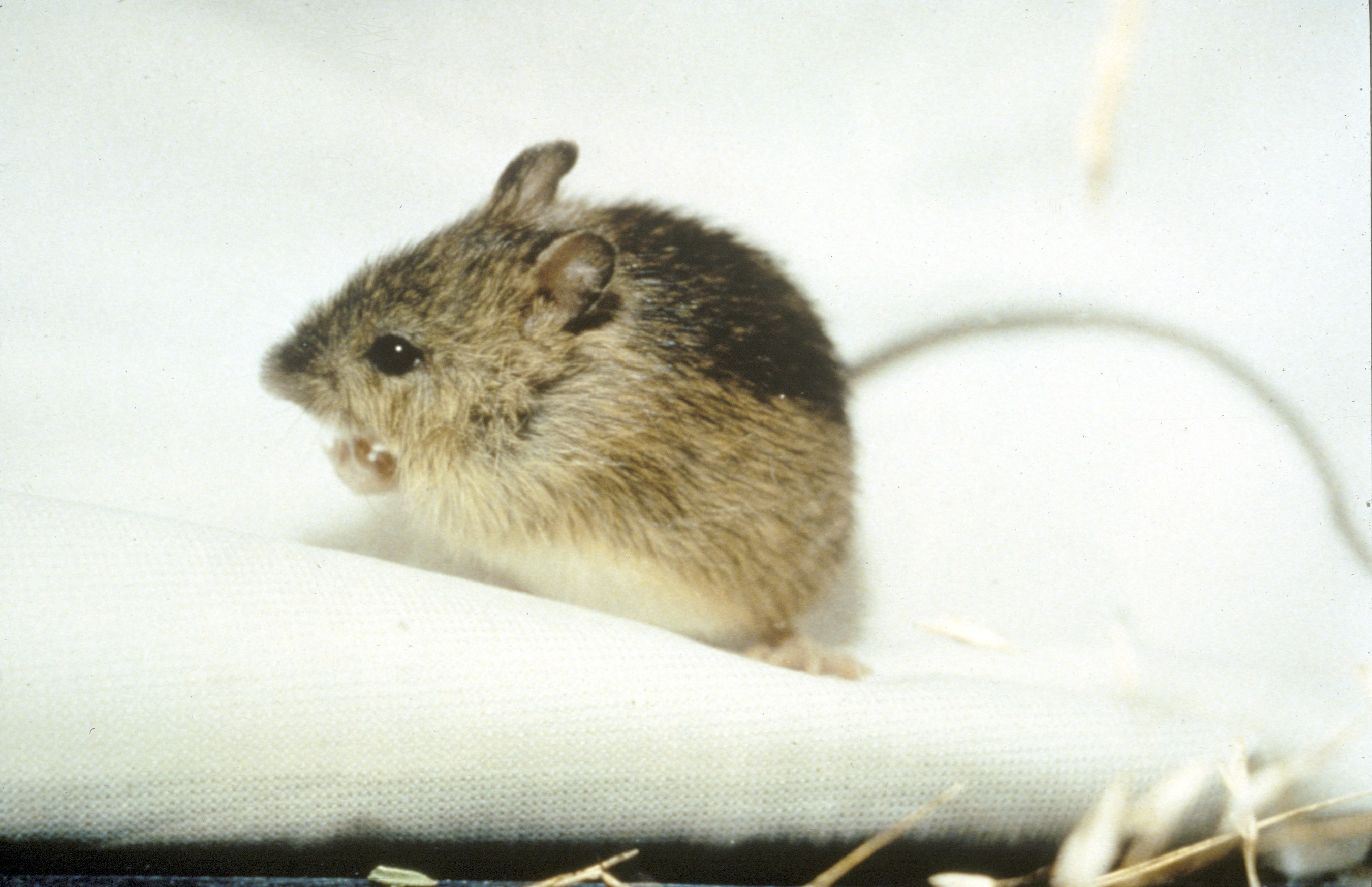
  - A living Zapus hudsonius, or meadow jumping mouse
    †Zapus hudsonius
  - †Zapus rinkeri – type locality for species
  - †Zapus sandersi – type locality for species
- Zonitoides
  - †Zonitoides arboreus
  - †Zonitoides nitidus
