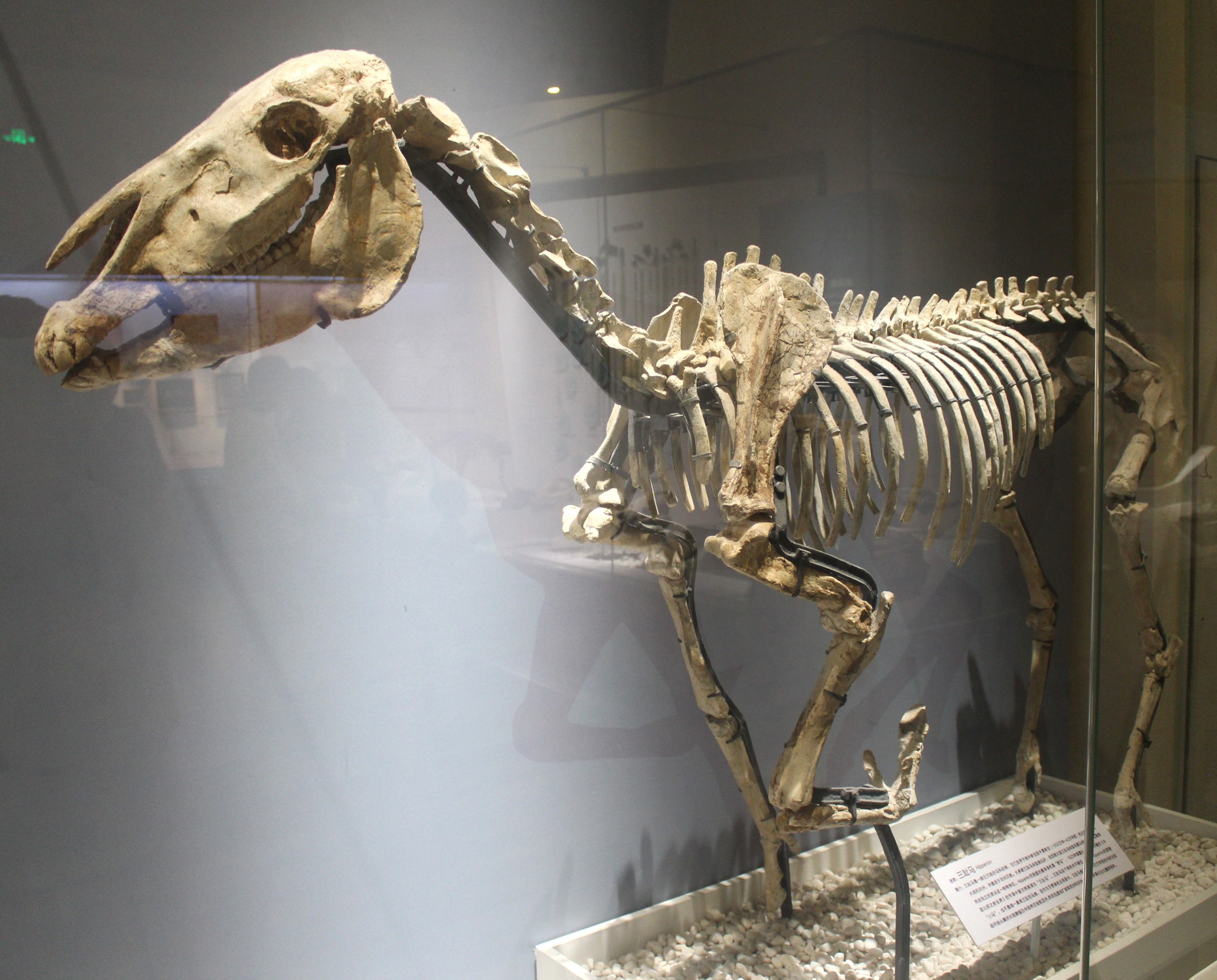
- Skeleton of Hipparion on display in China

Scientific classification
- Kingdom: Animalia
- Phylum: Chordata
- Class: Mammalia
- Order: Perissodactyla
- Family: Equidae
- Subfamily: Equinae
- Tribe: †Hipparionini; Quinn, 1955

Genera
- See text

= Hipparionini =

Hipparionini Temporal range: Early Miocene - Early Pleistocene 17–1 Ma

Extinct tribe of mammals

Hipparionini is an extinct tribe of three-toed equids in the subfamily Equinae. They had body forms similar to modern equines, with high-crowned teeth. They first appeared in North America during the Early Miocene around 17 million years ago, before migrating into the Old World around 11.4–11.0 million years ago. The youngest species date to the end of the early Early Pleistocene, becoming extinct following the arrival of modern equines of the genus Equus to the Old World.

== Description ==
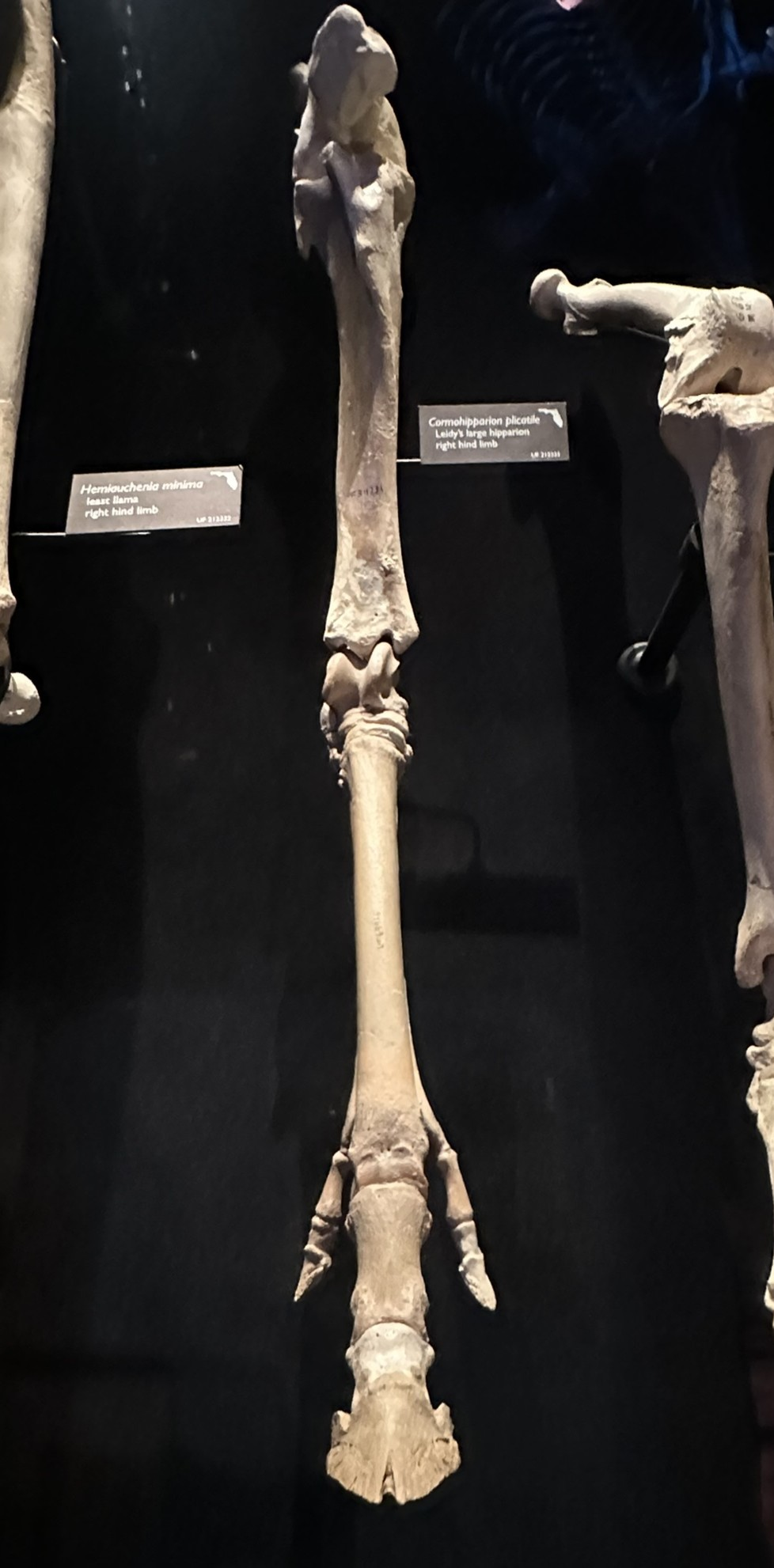
Leg of Cormohipparion, showing the three functional digits

Hipparionines varied widely in size, with the smallest species having a body mass of under 50 kilograms (110 lb), comparable to sheep, while the largest species had body masses over 300 kilograms (660 lb). Unlike modern horses, but like many other fossil equids, they bore three toes on each foot, with the two side digits being considerably smaller than the main central toe. Evidence from preserved trackways suggests that the side digits were functional rather than merely vestigial and contacted the ground, and may have been used for joint stabilization and load bearing, and may have aided movement when needing to change direction. It has been suggested that the underside of the central hoof had a frog like modern equines. Their teeth are somewhat lower crowned compared to modern equines, though they had relatively complex enamel patterns that exceed the enamel complexity of teeth of members of the tribe Equini, which is thought to have been an adaption to increasing wear resistance. Compared to modern equines, the metapodial bones of the leg/foot were longer, as is ancestrally found in equids. Some Old World hipparionines like Proboscidipparion developed retracted nasals and elongated snouts that may indicate the presence of a tapir-like proboscis.

== Evolutionary history ==
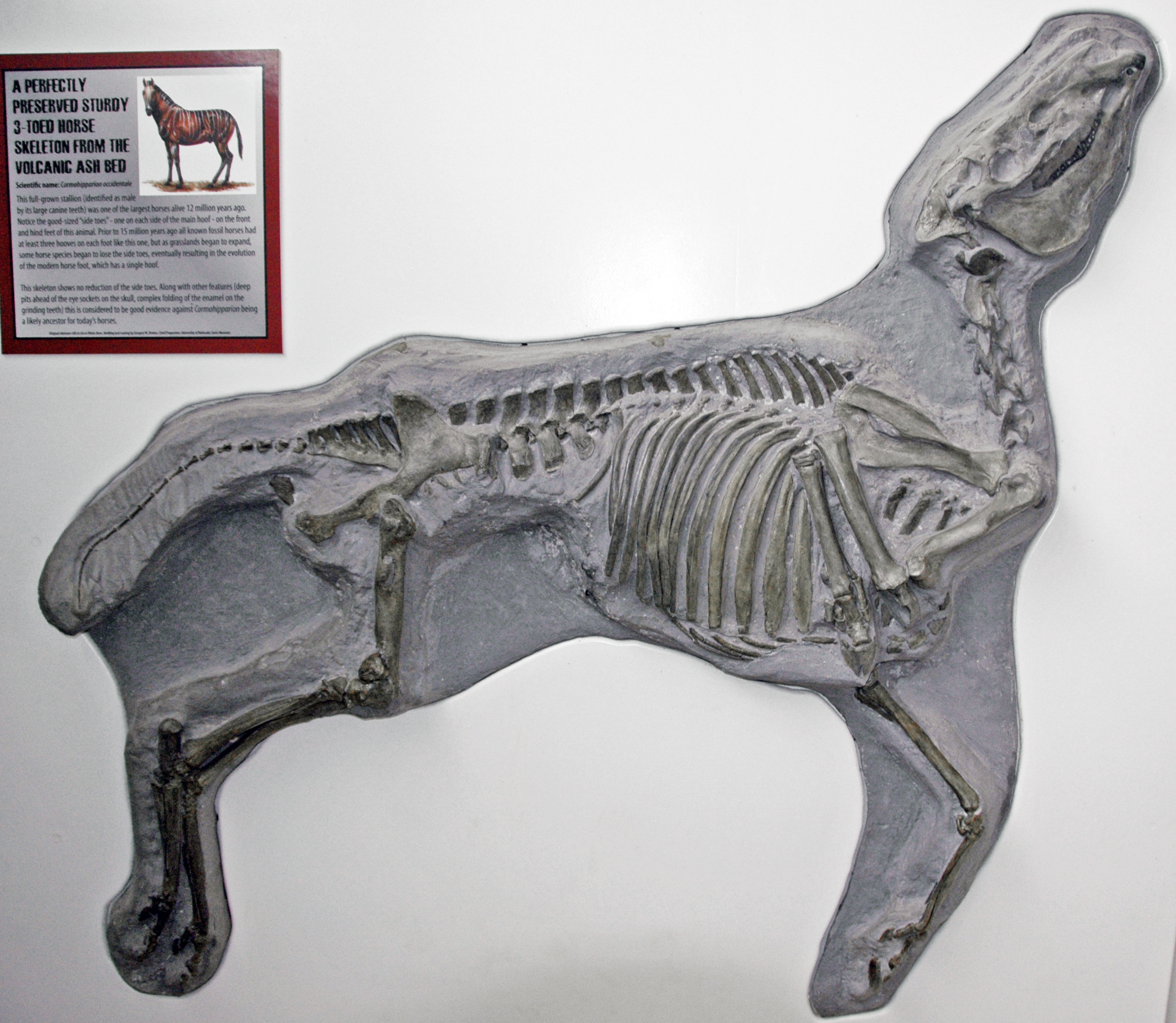
Skeleton of Cormohipparion from the Ashfall Fossil Beds, Nebraska. Cormohipparion is widely thought to be the ancestor of Old World hipparionines

Hipparionini originated in North America during the late Early Miocene, around 17 million years ago. In North America, hipparionins were equally diverse to equins during the Middle Miocene but overtook them in species richness during the Late Miocene and Early Pliocene. At the end of the Hemphillian (during the latest Miocene) hipparionins severely declined in diversity. Hipparionines eventually went extinct in North America during the Early Pleistocene, by which time they were confined to the southern latitudes of the continent. Following the end of the Miocene, hipparionines were only represented in North America by very small (sheep-sized) species of Cormohipparion and Nannippus.

Following their origin in North America, a member of the genus Cormohipparion crossed over into Eurasia via the Bering Land Bridge around 11.4–11 million years ago, becoming ancestral to all Old World hipparionines which was followed shortly afterwards by a migration into Africa around 10.5 million years ago, though hipparionines did not begin significantly diversifying in Africa until around 7.5 million years ago. During their first few million years in Eurasia, they coexisted alongside more primitive anchitheriin horses, which had cross the Bering Land Bridge from North America 8 million years earlier, which subsequently became extinct around 9 million years ago. Hipparionines subsequently diversified in Afro-Eurasia, reaching maximum diversity around 7.6–6.8 million years ago, though at the end of the Miocene, around 6.8–5.3 million years ago, numerous lineages of Old World hipparionine lineages became extinct. During the following Pliocene, Old World hipparionins developed larger body sizes and higher crowned teeth to cope with environmental change, although their increase in hypsodonty was not as pronounced as in New World hipparionins. At the Pliocene-Pleistocene boundary, approximately 2.6 million years ago "stenonine" equines of the genus Equus migrated into Eurasia from North America, providing direct competition with the hipparionines. The last hipparionines in the Old World are Proboscidipparion sinense from China, and Eurygnathohippus cornelianus from Africa, dating to the end of the Early Pleistocene, approximately 1 million years ago.

== Ecology ==
In North America, Cormohipparion aff. C. quinni from the Barstovian (15–16 mya) and Neohipparion eurystyle from the Hemphillian (early Pliocene 4.7–4.8 mya) of Mexico have been suggested to have been mixed feeders (both browsing and grazing).

In the Old World hipparionins were initially browsers and mixed feeders (both browsing and grazing), over time there was increasing proportion of pure grazers, though the groups ecology remained diverse, with mixed feeding being the dominant ecology during the Pliocene. Hipparionins in the western Mediterranean during the Vallesian and Turolian stages of the late Miocene exhibited noticeable niche partitioning, with smaller forms being mixed feeders while larger species had more grazing diets. In contrast, contemporaneous eastern Mediterranean hipparionins did not exhibit such niche partitioning.

Predators of hipparionines likely included sabertooth cats, such as Promegantereon and Machairodus, and amphicyonids (bear-dogs) such as Magericyon and Thaumastocyon, the large mustelid Eomellivora and the bear Indarctos in the late Miocene Batallones fossil site in Spain, and the sabertooth cat Homotherium and the hyena Crocuta in the Pliocene of Hadar, Ethiopia, based on isotopic analysis.

== List of genera ==
North American genera:

- "Hipparion" (distinct from Old World species assigned to this genus)
- Neohipparion
- Pseudhipparion
- Nannippus
- Cormohipparion
- Many species of Merychippus are also hipparionines, though the genus also contains non-hipparionine species.

Old World genera: (widely thought to descend from Cormohipparion)

- Hipparion sensu stricto
- Hippotherium
- Cremohipparion
- Sivalhippus
- Eurygnathohippus
- Plesiohipparion
- Proboscidipparion
- Shanxihippus
