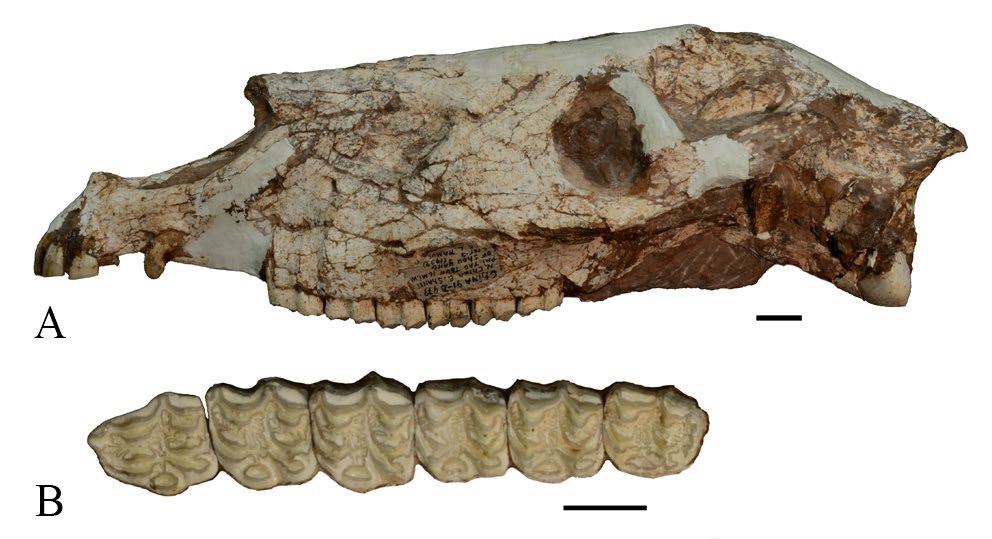
- Skull and teeth of S. ptychodus

Scientific classification
- Kingdom: Animalia
- Phylum: Chordata
- Class: Mammalia
- Order: Perissodactyla
- Family: Equidae
- Genus: †Sivalhippus; Lydekker, 1877

Type species
- †Sivalhippus theobaldi Lydekker, 1877

Species
- †Sivalhippus anwari Wolf, Bernor, and Hussain, 2013; †Sivalhippus nagriensis (Hussain, 1971); †Sivalhippus platyodus (Zhegallo, 1971); †Sivalhippus perimensis (Pilgrim, 1910); †Sivalhippus theobaldi Lydekker, 1877; †Sivalhippus turkanensis Hooijer and Maglio, 1974

= Sivalhippus =

Sivalhippus Temporal range: Late Miocene-Pliocene 10.7–2.58 Ma

Extinct genus of mammals

Sivalhippus is an extinct genus of horse that lived in Africa and Asia during the late Miocene to Pliocene.

== Taxonomy ==
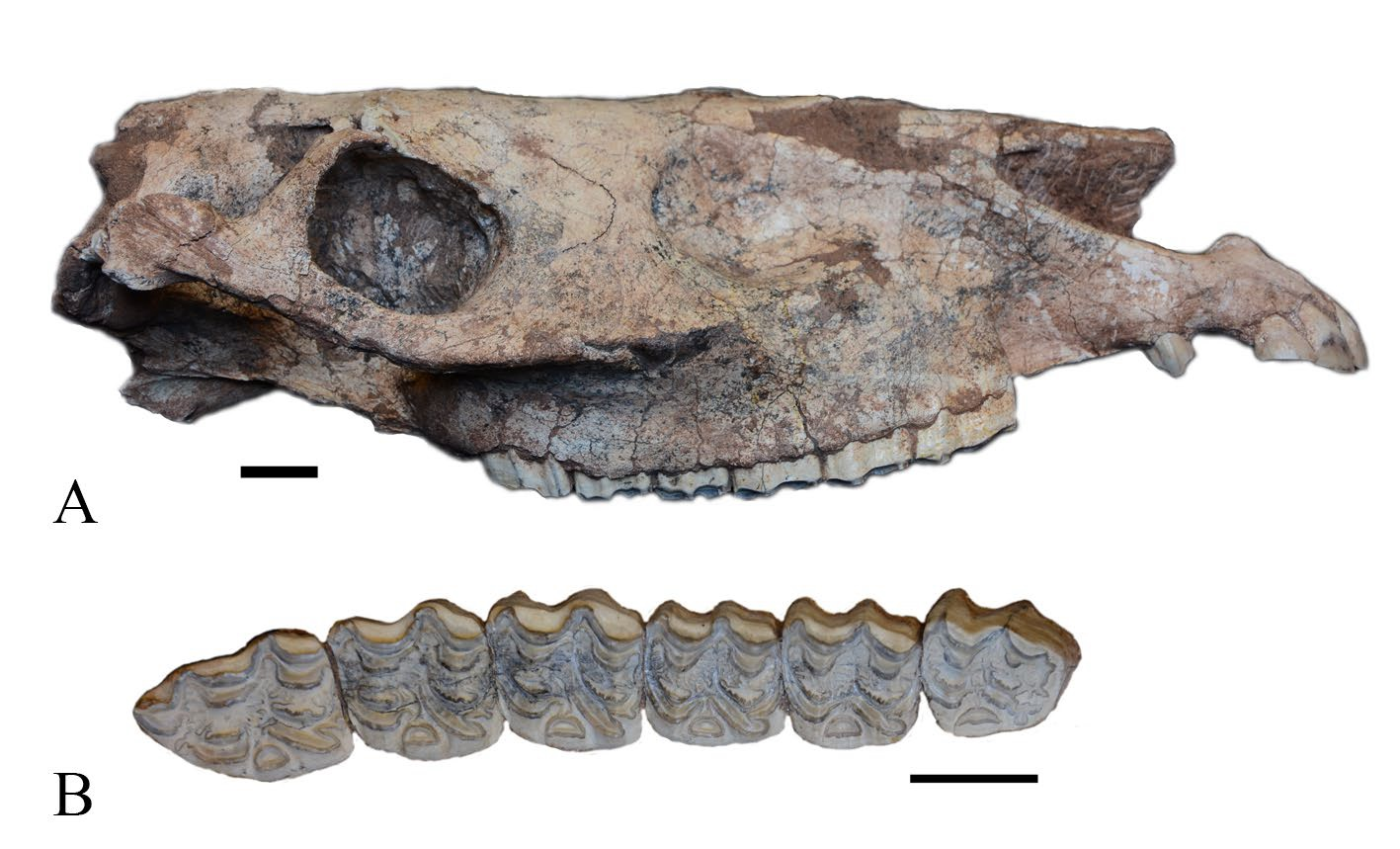
Skull and teeth of S. platyodus

This genus has a convoluted taxonomic history. After being described as a distinct genus, the holotype of Sivalhippus theobaldi, GSI 153, was later referred to Hippotherium and then Hipparion, as was the case with most other hipparionin species for most of the 20th century. Later, Skinner and MacFadden (1977), MacFadden and Bakr (1979), and MacFadden and Woodburne (1982) reassigned Sivalhippus to the North American genus Cormohipparion based on similarities with specimens of that genus. However, a 2013 review of Sivalik hipparionins found Sivalihippus to be distinct from Cormohipparion and more closely related to Proboscidipparion and Cremohipparion than to Cormohipparion.

== Paleobiology ==
Like other extinct horses, the habitat (biome) of Sivalhippus consisted of non-forested, grassy plains, shortgrass prairie or steppes. Although Cremohipparion-like horses have been found in younger deposits of the Sivalik Hills, they tend to be much rarer.
