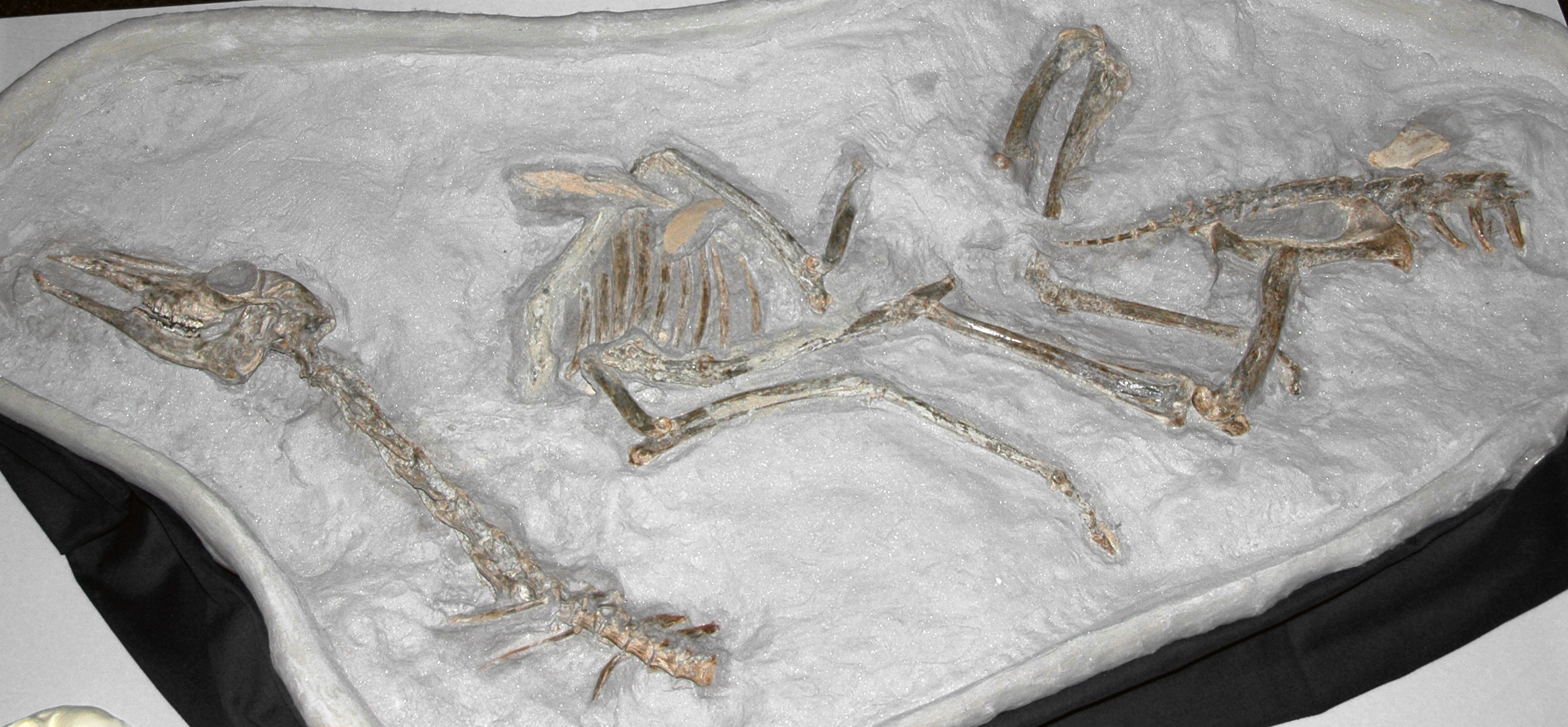
- Female from the Ashfall Fossil Beds
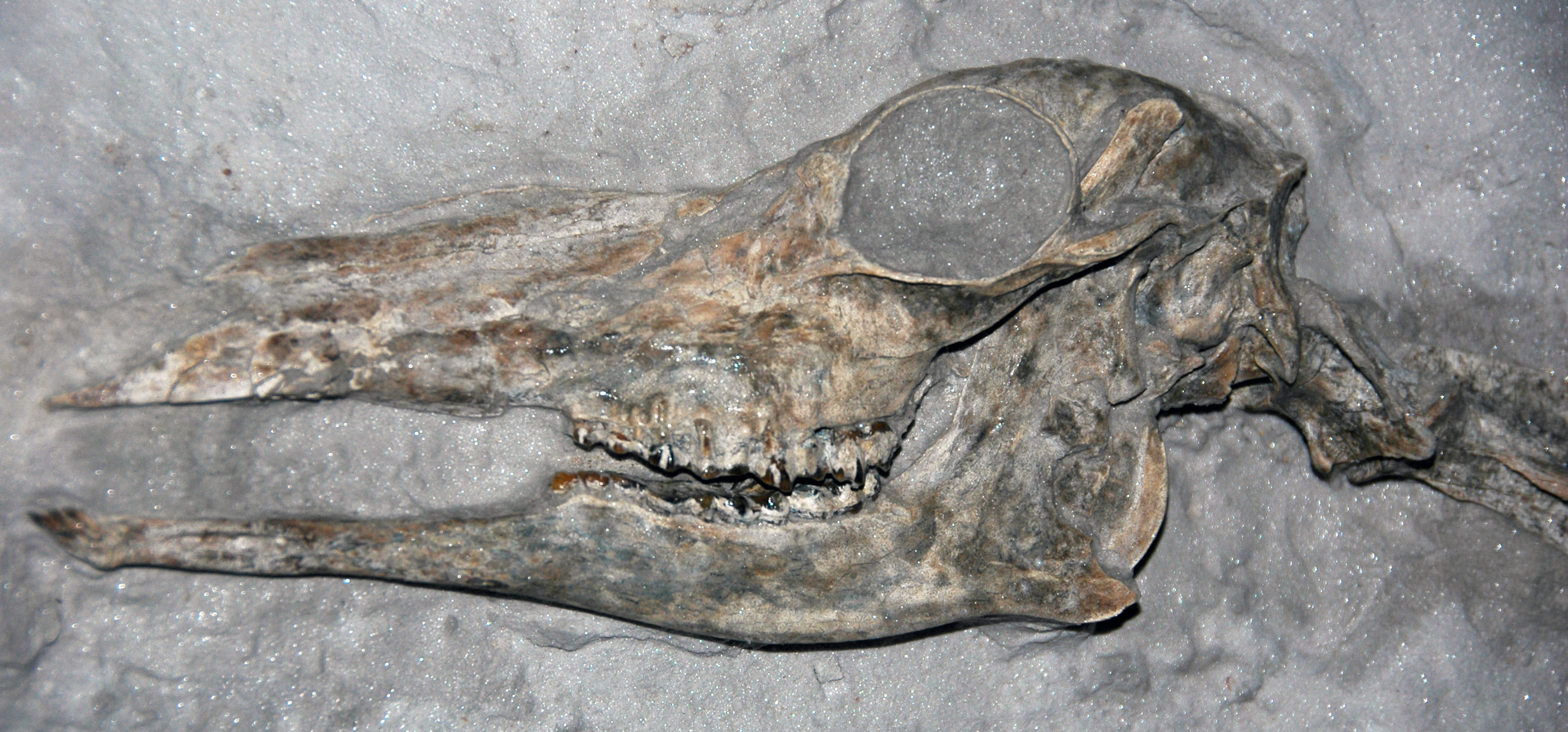
- A skull from a female in Nebraska, United States

Scientific classification
- Kingdom: Animalia
- Phylum: Chordata
- Class: Mammalia
- Infraclass: Placentalia
- Order: Artiodactyla
- Family: Moschidae
- Subfamily: †Blastomerycinae
- Genus: †Longirostromeryx; Frick, 1937

Type species
- †Blastomeryx wellsi

Species
- †?L. blicki; †L. clarendoniensis; †L. novomexicanus; †L. wellsi

= Longirostromeryx =

Longirostromeryx Temporal range: middle Miocene to late Pliocene

Extinct genus of musk deer

Longirostromeryx is an extinct genus of musk deer that belonged to the subfamily Blastomerycinae. It lived in central North America from the Miocene to the late Pliocene epochs. This genus contains three, perhaps four, recognized species: L. clarendoniensis, L. novomexicanus, L. wellsi and ?L. blicki.

It lived in closed environments such as bushlands where it was likely both a selective browser and grazing species. This is suggested by its unique skeletal and dental morphology (see description).

== Taxonomy ==
This genus is a member of Blastomerycinae, an extinct subfamily of small, hornless ruminants that lived in North America. The exact taxonomic placement of this subfamily is uncertain but is likely outside of Moschidae in an currently unnamed family.

Longirostromeryx wellsi small being only is one of the last surviving members of Blastomerycinae.

== Description ==
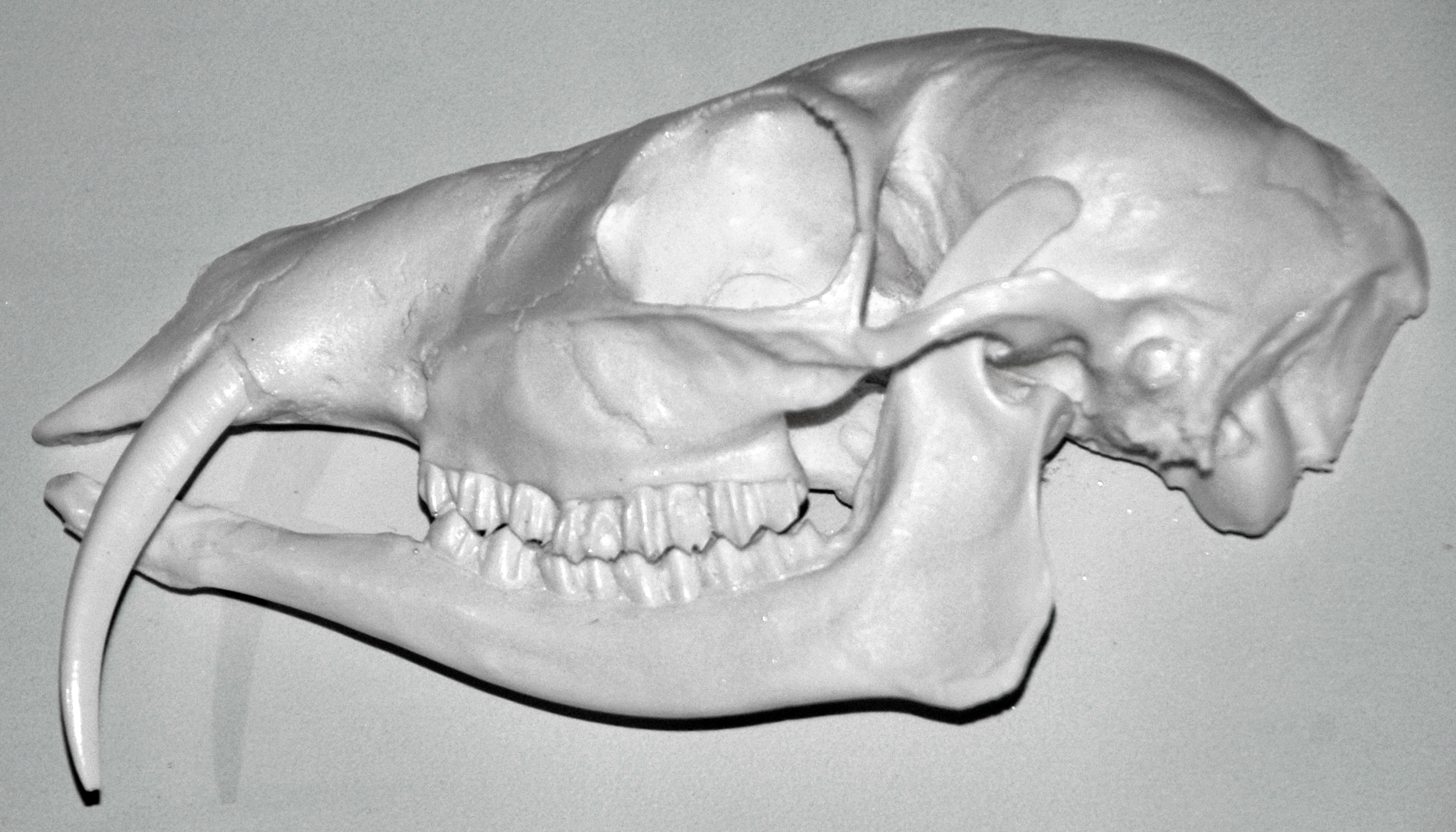

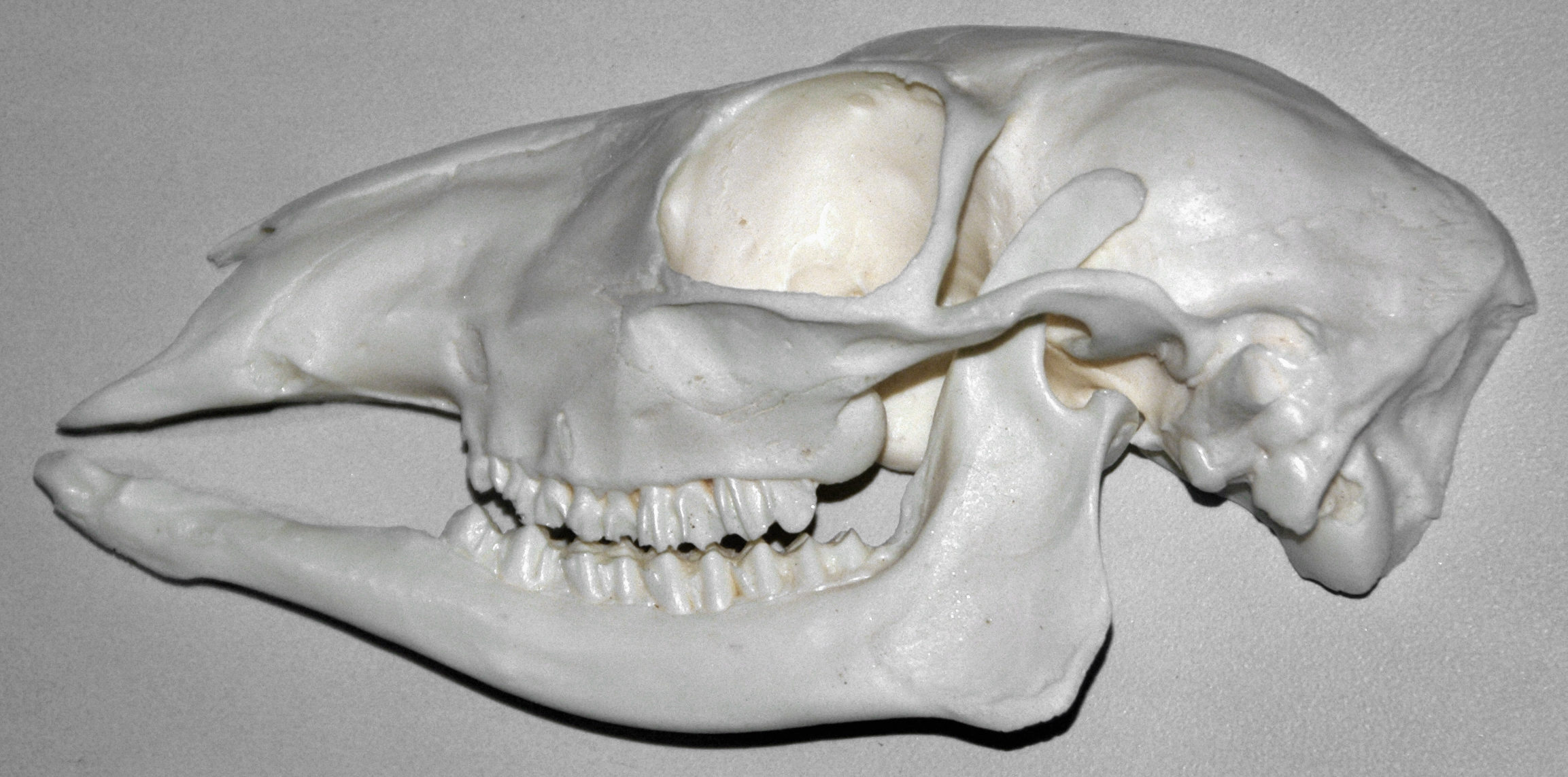
Skull replicas: male (top), female (bottom)

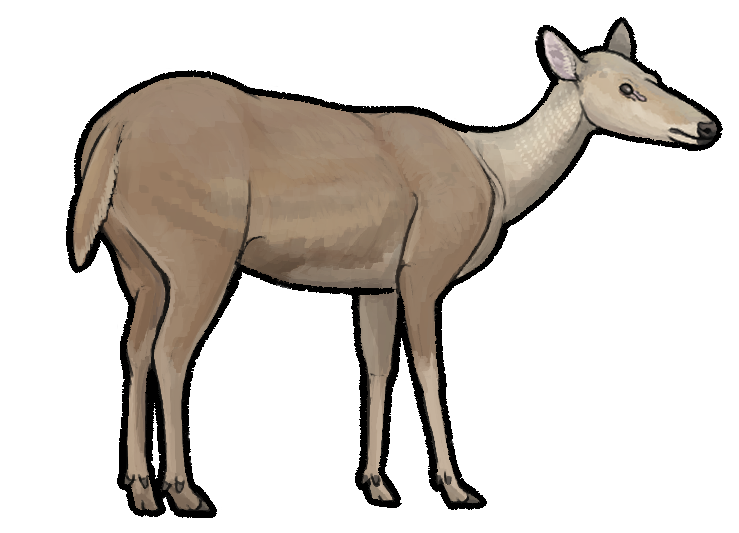
Life restoration of a female Longirostromeryx wellsi

They have highly derived craniodental morphology that differs from that of typical musk deer. It is distinguished from other small artiodactyls from North America with its elongated rostrum, an increased length of the diastema between the canines and the anterior-most premolar, increased molar hypsodonty and a reduction in the size of the premolar.

It has been suggested that Longirostromeryx lived in open habitats such as savannas. However it seems that Longirostromeryx likely inhabited closed habitats such as bushlands. This is supported by the anatomy of Longirostromeryx. The anatomy shows that it is more similar to species that occupy heavy woodland-bushland environments such as other Bladtomerycines, musk deer and artiodactyls. The forelimb and proximal hindlimb anatomy of Longirostromeryx reveals that it was not a specialized runner which is expected to be found more in closed habitat inhabiting species than open.

== Environment ==
During the Miocene epoch of North America, in the area of Ashfall Fossil Beds State Historical Park), the environment Longirostromeryx wellsi consisted of a broad mosaic of savanna-woodlands. The environment Ashfall fossil beds contained a high diversity of ungulates such as rhinoceroses (Teleoceras), horses (Cormohipparion, Pliohippus, and Pseudhipparion) and camels (Procamelus and Protolabis). Out of the ungulate fauna, Longirostromeryx wellsi is the smallest species.
