= Khersonotherium =

Khersonotherium Temporal range: Miocene to Pliocene

Scientific classification
- Kingdom: Animalia
- Phylum: Chordata
- Class: Mammalia
- Order: Artiodactyla
- Family: Giraffidae
- Genus: †Khersonotherium

Extinct genus of mammals

Khersonotherium is a genus of prehistoric giraffes. Its remains were found in Ukraine and in Africa.

== Etymology ==
The first part of the generic name, "Kherson" refers to a city in Ukraine, where the first specimens were recovered. The second part, therium, comes from the Greek, θηρίον which means "beast".

== Distribution ==
Most fossils of Khersonotherium are found in Ukraine. In Russia and Ukraine the fauna in which it lived is called "hipparionova fauna" - the fauna in which Hipparion was a dominant member. A skeleton of Khersonotherium, found in Odessa, a city in Ukraine, is displayed in Kyiv Paleontological Museum.
