= Jules de Christol =

Jules de Christol (25 August 1802 – 25 June 1861) was a French paleontologist and geologist who identified the fossil horse ancestor Hipparion. He was among the first French zoologists to suggest the existence of human remains that were "antediluvian", older than the supposed Biblical flood, contrary to the dominant view of Earth history at the time.

De Christol was born in Montepellier and became a student of Marcel de Serres, a professor at Montpellier. In 1828, he discovered human remains and pottery in Souvignargues alongside remains of rhino, bear, and hyena bones. He then suggested the existence of humans alongside animals that were traditionally supposed to have gone extinct after the Biblical flood, a view supported by the dominant French zoologists of the time, like Georges Cuvier. His idea was, however, supported by William Buckland, who visited him during the digs in Lunel-Viel. He saw similar remains in 1829 in a cave in Pondres, digging along with Dumas Emilien. In 1832, he described the fossil equid Hipparion. He received a doctorate in 1834 and became a professor of geology and mineralogy in the faculty of science in Dijon in 1837. He was made a member of the Legion of Honour in 1847.

The plant genus Christolea Cambess was named in his honour.
