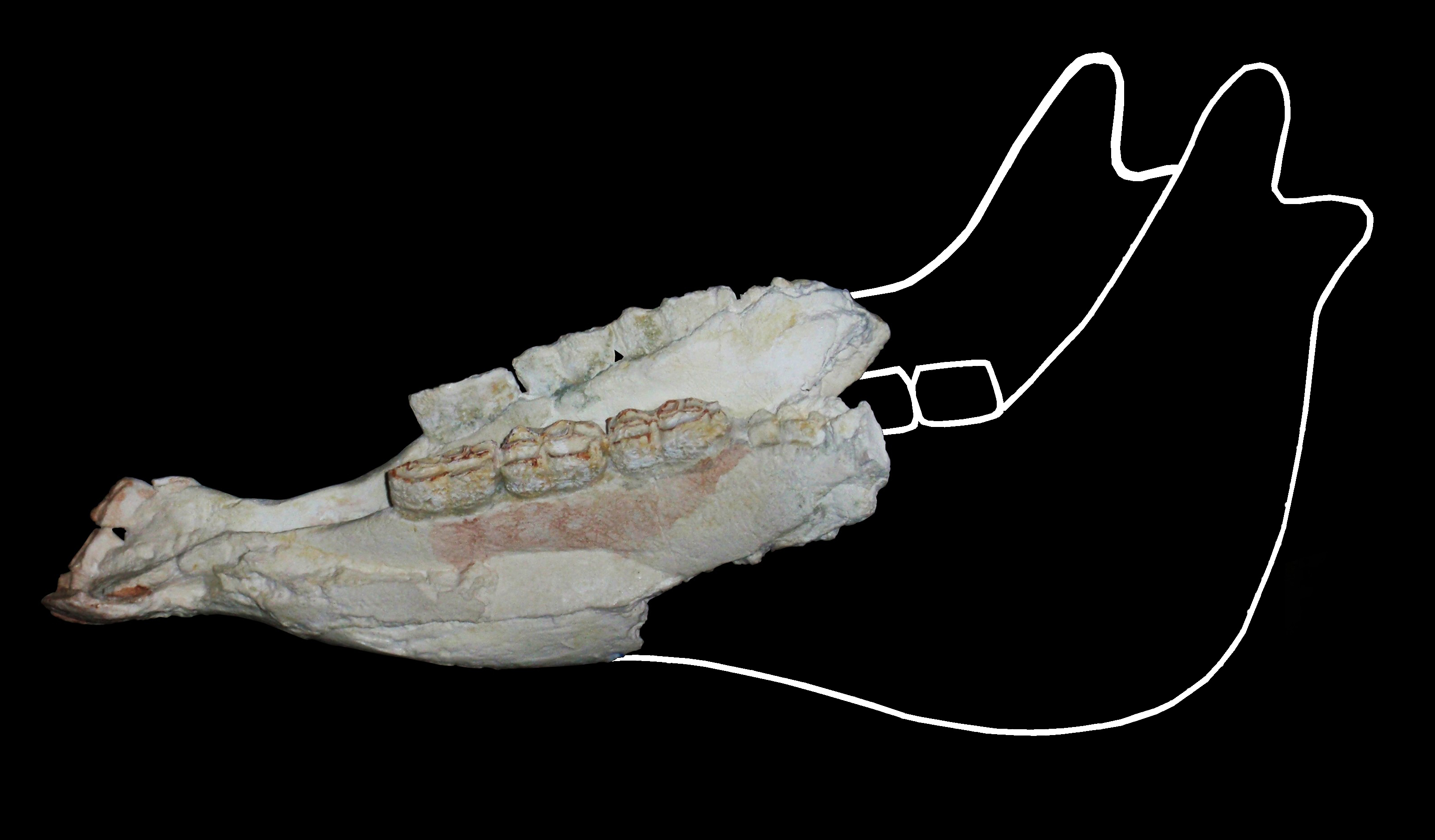
- Jaw of Nannippus

Scientific classification
- Kingdom: Animalia
- Phylum: Chordata
- Class: Mammalia
- Order: Perissodactyla
- Family: Equidae
- Subfamily: Equinae
- Tribe: †Hipparionini
- Genus: †Nannippus; Matthew, 1926

= Nannippus =

Nannippus Temporal range: late Miocene- early Pleistocene

Extinct genus of mammals

Nannippus is an extinct genus of three-toed horse endemic to North America during the Miocene through Pleistocene, about 13.3—1.8 million years ago (Mya), living around 11.5 million years. This ancient species of three-toed horse grew up to 3.5 feet (1.1 meters) and weighed between 165 pounds (75 kilograms) to 199 pounds (90 kilograms), which was around the same size as a domestic sheep.

== Distribution ==
Nannippus lived as far south as central Mexico (N. peninsulatus) to as far north as Canada (N. lenticularis), to California in the west, and North Carolina (N. lenticularis) and Florida (N. peninsulatus) in the east.

== Palaeoecology ==
Unlike its relatives, Nannippus, as well as all other three-toed horses endemic to North America, were browsers and mixed feeders that had diets consisting of C3 plants and possibly C4 plants. Dental microwear and mesowear of N. peninsulatus specimens from west-central Mexico suggests that it was a mixed feeder or a non-strict grazer, with a moderately abrasive diet over the course of its lifetime.

== Species ==
- N. aztecus Mooser, 1968. Widespread in Florida and also found in Texas, Oklahoma, and Chihuahua, became extinct 11.2—5.7 Mya.
- N. beckensis Dalquest and Donovan, 1973 found in Texas only and became extinct about 3.4 Mya.
- N. lenticularis (Cope, 1893) was found in Alberta, Canada, Texas, North Carolina, Alabama, Nebraska, and Kansas, becoming extinct about 13 Mya.
- N. minor (Sellards, 1916) lived in Georgia during the Pliocene.
- N. montezumae (Leidy, 1882)
- N. morgani Hulbert, 1993 is restricted to Florida and appears to have become extinct about 8.6 Mya.
- N. peninsulatus (Cope, 1893) was found in Florida, Texas, Oklahoma, New Mexico, Arizona, and Mexico, becoming extinct about 3.3 Mya.
- N. parvulus (Marsh, 1868)
- N. westoni Simpson, 1930 is restricted to Florida and became extinct about 9.1—8.7 Mya.
