= Michael Voorhies =

American paleontologist

Michael Voorhies is a retired paleontologist and earth scientist whose career was affiliated with the University of Nebraska State Museum. He is best known for discovering the Ashfall Fossil Beds, a National Natural Landmark in Antelope County, Nebraska. Acreage within the site has been preserved as the Ashfall Fossil Beds State Historical Park.

== Discovery ==
Voorhies stated that he and his wife Jane Voorhies discovered the site on a hike in 1971 when they caught sight, by chance, of a fossilized animal skull eroding out of a Verdigre Creek farm slope carved by water erosion. The skull proved to be part of a lagerstätten, a bonanza site of well-preserved remains from a group of life-forms fossilized at a single moment in time. Investigations showed that the a water-cut gully, part of an overall local pattern of agricultural erosion, had chipped down a layer of Nebraska sandstone caprock that had previously granted durable, multi-million-year protection to a bed of volcanic ash. The ash, deposited by a catastrophic supervolcano eruption during the Miocene geological epoch approximately 12 million years before the present, had killed the Miocene animals and preserved their remains. Subsequent digs uncovered numerous fossilized remains of animals ancestral to today's camels, dogs, horses, and rhinoceroses. Prior to the eruption, the central North American site had been a savanna watering hole similar to geological formations found today in East Africa.

Voorhies took steps to popularize his discovery, including an article published in 1981 in the periodical National Geographic. Advocacy work, led by Voorhies, persuaded the Nebraska Game and Parks Foundation to purchase a land parcel encompassing the excavation site in 1986. The land parcel was opened to the public as a state park in 1991. The site was declared a National Natural Landmark in 2006, and the Hubbard Rhino Barn, an on-site public viewing site for continuing paleontological excavation, was opened in 2009.

== Honors and legacy ==
In October 2013, Voorhies was named as a recipient of the Henry Fonda Award from the Nebraska Tourism Commission for his discovery, study, and development of the Ashfall Fossil Beds.
