= Ashfall Fossil Beds =

Park in Nebraska, USA

Ashfall Fossil Beds State Historical Park
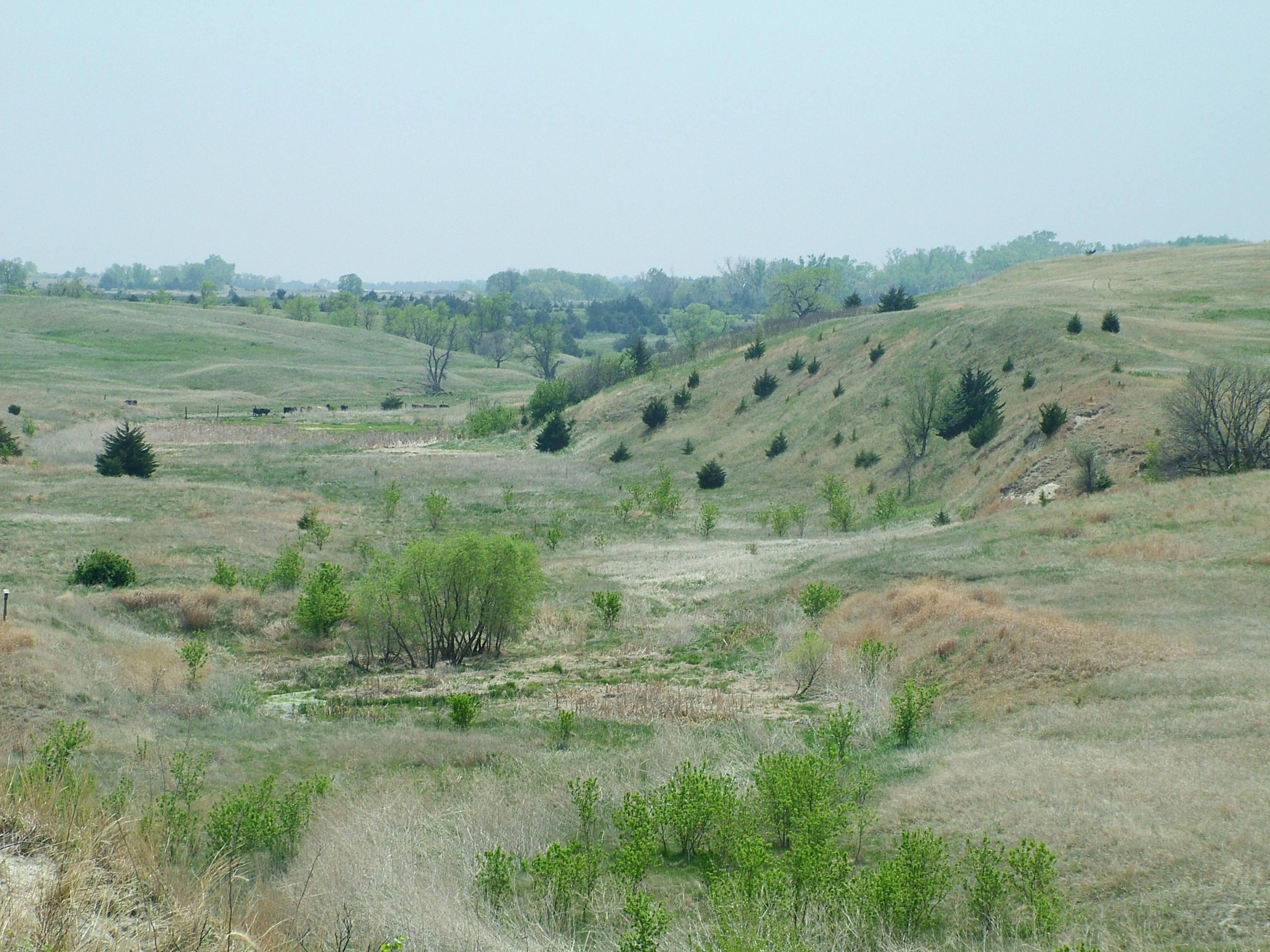
- Hills surrounding the fossil beds

- Location within Nebraska
- Location: Antelope County, Nebraska, United States
- Nearest town: Royal, Nebraska
- Coordinates: 42°25′30″N 98°09′31″W
- Area: 360 acres (150 ha)
- Elevation: 1,722 ft (525 m)
- Designation: Nebraska state historical park
- Established: 1986
- Operator: University of Nebraska–Lincoln
- Website: Ashfall Fossil Beds; State Historical Park

U.S. National Natural Landmark
- Designated: 2006

The Ashfall Fossil Beds of Antelope County in northeastern Nebraska are rare fossil sites of the type called lagerstätten that, due to extraordinary local conditions, capture an ecological "snapshot" in time of a range of well-preserved fossilized organisms. Ash from a Yellowstone hotspot eruption 10-12 million years ago created these fossilized bone beds. The ash depth was up to 1 foot. At the Ashfall Fossil Beds site, the ash depth is instead 8 to 10 feet due to the depression of a watering hole.

The site is protected as Ashfall Fossil Beds State Historical Park, a 360-acre (150 ha) park that includes a visitor center with interpretive displays and working fossil preparation laboratory, and a protected ongoing excavation site, the Hubbard Rhino Barn, featuring fossil Teleoceras (native hippo-like ancestral rhinoceros) and ancestral horses.

The Ashfall Fossil Beds are especially famous for fossils of mammals from the middle Miocene geologic epoch. The Ashfall Fossil Beds are stratigraphically part of the Serravallian-age Ogallala Group, within the Ash Hollow Formation.

== Bruneau-Jarbidge event ==
The Ashfall deposit preserves the fossilized remains of ancient animals that perished in a dense volcanic ash fall which occurred during the late Miocene, approximately 12 million years ago; the animals had come to a waterhole seeking relief. The fall of ash drifted downwind from the Bruneau-Jarbidge supervolcano eruption (in present-day Idaho), nearly 1,000 miles (1,600 km) west of the Ashfall site. A large number of very well preserved fossil Teleoceras (extinct hippo-like relatives of rhinos), small three-toed and one-toed horses, camels, and birds have been excavated. Many animals were preserved with their bones articulated; one rhino still bears her unborn fetus, while others retain the contents of their last meal.

The bones of the animals show features that indicate that the animals died of lung failure induced by inhaling volcanic ash. The smaller animals with smaller lung capacity were the first to die, and the larger animals were the last. Bite-marks on some bones show that local predators (the carnivorous bone-crunching dog Aelurodon) scavenged some of the carcasses, but no predator remains have yet surfaced. There are also abundant clues to the region's ecology, indicating a savanna of grassland interspersed with trees that luxuriated in a warmer, milder climate than today's.

The rapidly accumulating ash, windblown into deep drifts at low places like the waterhole site, remained moderately soft. The ash preserved the animals in three dimensions; not even the delicate bones of birds or the carapaces of turtles were crushed. Above the layer of ash, a stratum of more erosion-resistant sandstone has acted as "caprock" to preserve the strata beneath.

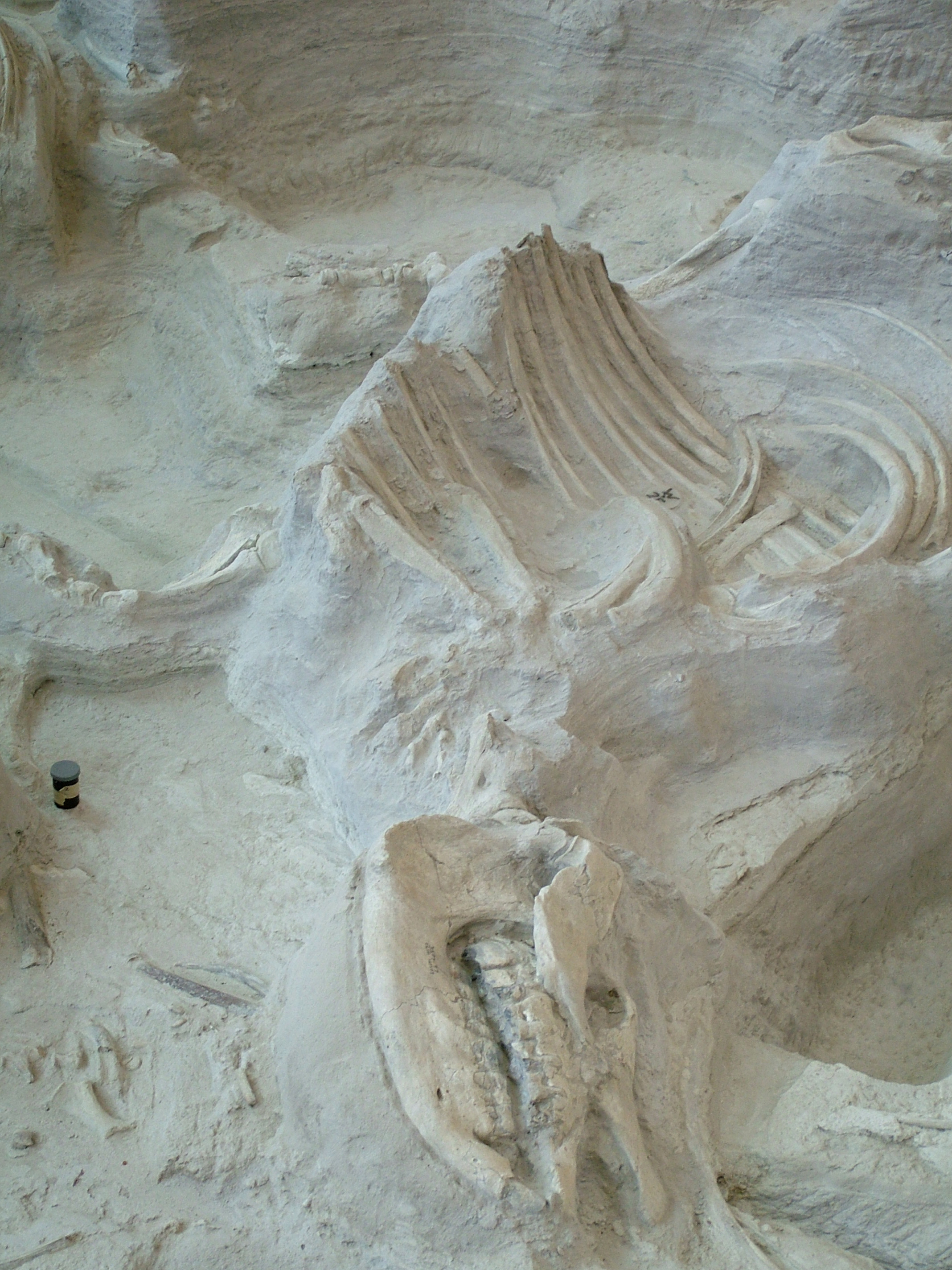
Fossil of a Teleoceras in volcanic ash.

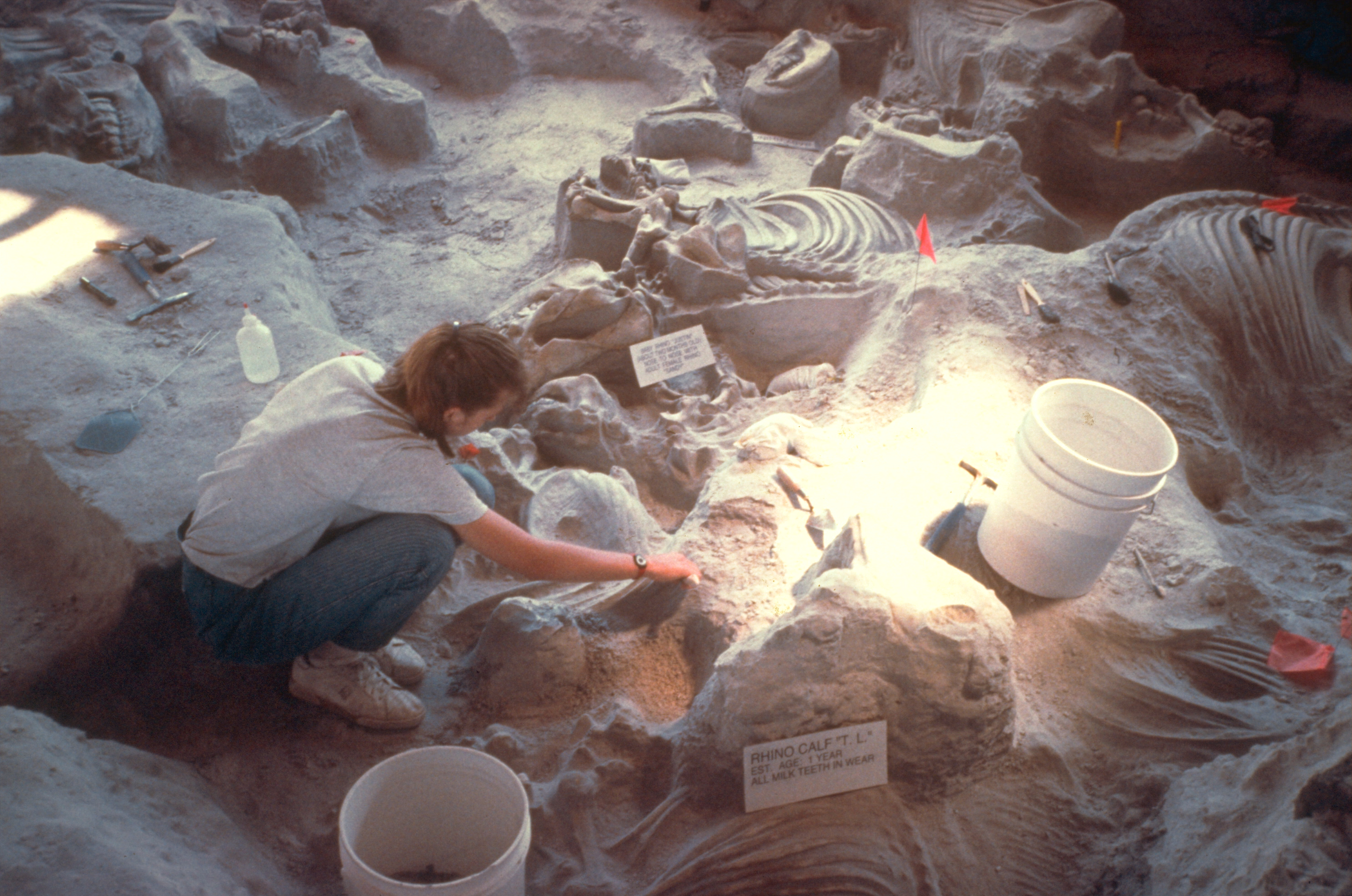
Paleontologists working on the site

== Preservation ==
The first hint of the site's richness was the skull of a juvenile rhinoceros noticed in 1971 eroding out of a gully at the edge of a cornfield. In 1971, University of Nebraska State Museum paleontologist Michael Voorhies was walking with his wife Jane through a series of gullies on Melvin Colson's farm in northeastern Nebraska and made this discovery. The Nebraska Game and Parks Foundation purchased the Ashfall site in 1986. Ashfall Fossil Beds State Historical Park opened in 1991. The site was declared a National Natural Landmark on May 9, 2006.

The park's Hubbard Rhino Barn opened in 2009. The 17,500-square-foot (1,630 m^{2}) pavilion lets visitors observe as paleontologists carry out excavations of new discoveries exactly where the fossilized remains lie preserved. Specially constructed walkways afford visitors an unobstructed close-up view of paleontologists at work during the summer field season.

== Species ==
The remains of Teleoceras are so numerous and concentrated that the main section of Ashfall is called the "Rhino Barn". Other fossils at the "Rhino Barn" include the remains of horses and camels. Taxa discovered in the Ashfall deposits include:

- five horse genera: Cormohipparion, Protohippus, Pseudhipparion, Neohipparion and Pliohippus
- three camelid genera: Procamelus, Aepycamelus and Protolabis
- three canid genera: Leptocyon, Cynarctus and evidence of scavenging from a bone-crushing canid, possibly Epicyon
- one rhinoceros genus: Teleoceras
- one saber-toothed musk deer genus: Longirostromeryx
- three bird species: Balearica exigua (a crowned crane), Apatosagittarius (a hawk resembling the living secretarybird), and Anchigyps (a scavenger related to Old World vultures)
- three turtle species: Hesperotestudo (a large tortoise), Sternotherus (a musk turtle) and Chrysemys (a painted turtle)

== See also ==
- Gray Fossil Site
- List of fossil sites
- Pipe Creek Sinkhole
