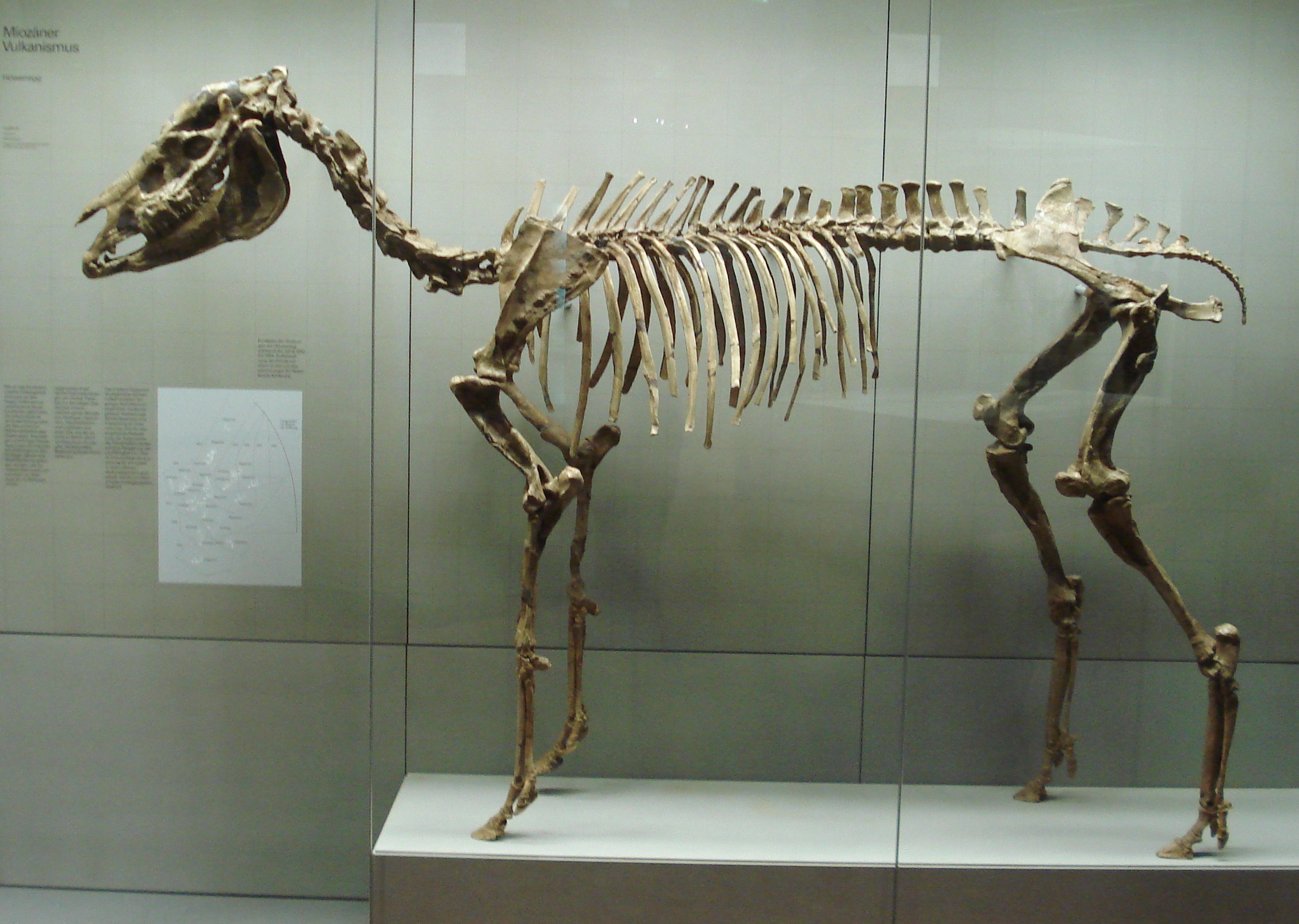
- Skeleton of Hippotherium primigenium, Staatliches Museum für Naturkunde Stuttgart

Scientific classification
- Kingdom: Animalia
- Phylum: Chordata
- Class: Mammalia
- Order: Perissodactyla
- Family: Equidae
- Subfamily: Equinae
- Tribe: †Hipparionini
- Genus: †Hippotherium; Kaup, 1832

Species
- H. primigenius (von Meyer, 1829) (type species); H. weihoense (Liu et al. 1978); H. koenigswaldi (Sondaar, 1961); H. catalaunicum (Perlot, 1956)

= Hippotherium =

Hippotherium Temporal range: 15–11 Ma Middle to Late Miocene

Extinct genus of mammals

Hippotherium is an extinct genus of horse that lived during the Miocene through Pliocene ~13.65—6.7 Mya, existing for 6.95 million years.

The last known surviving Hippotherium was H. malpassii, found in Italy.

== Species ==
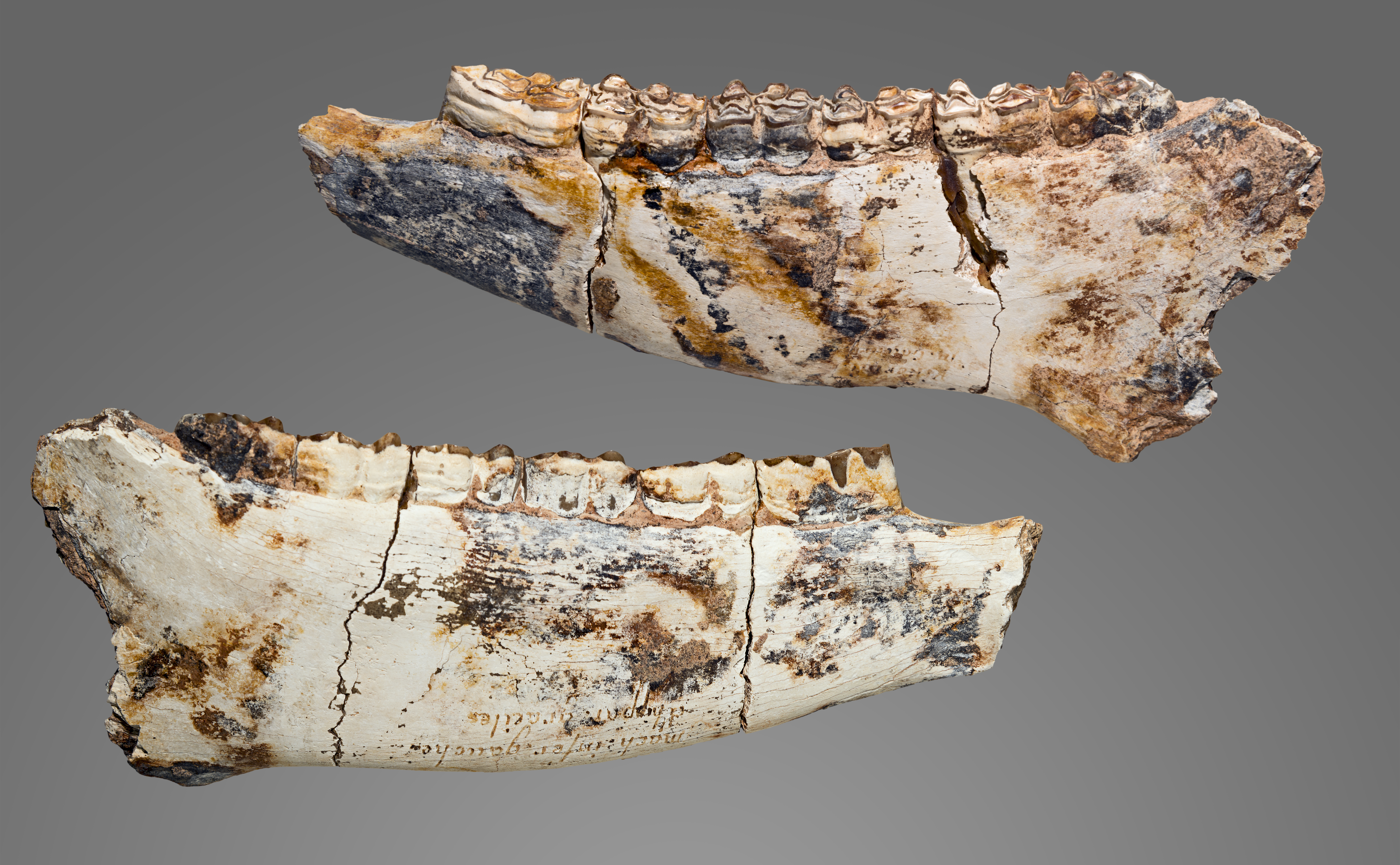
Jaw and teeth

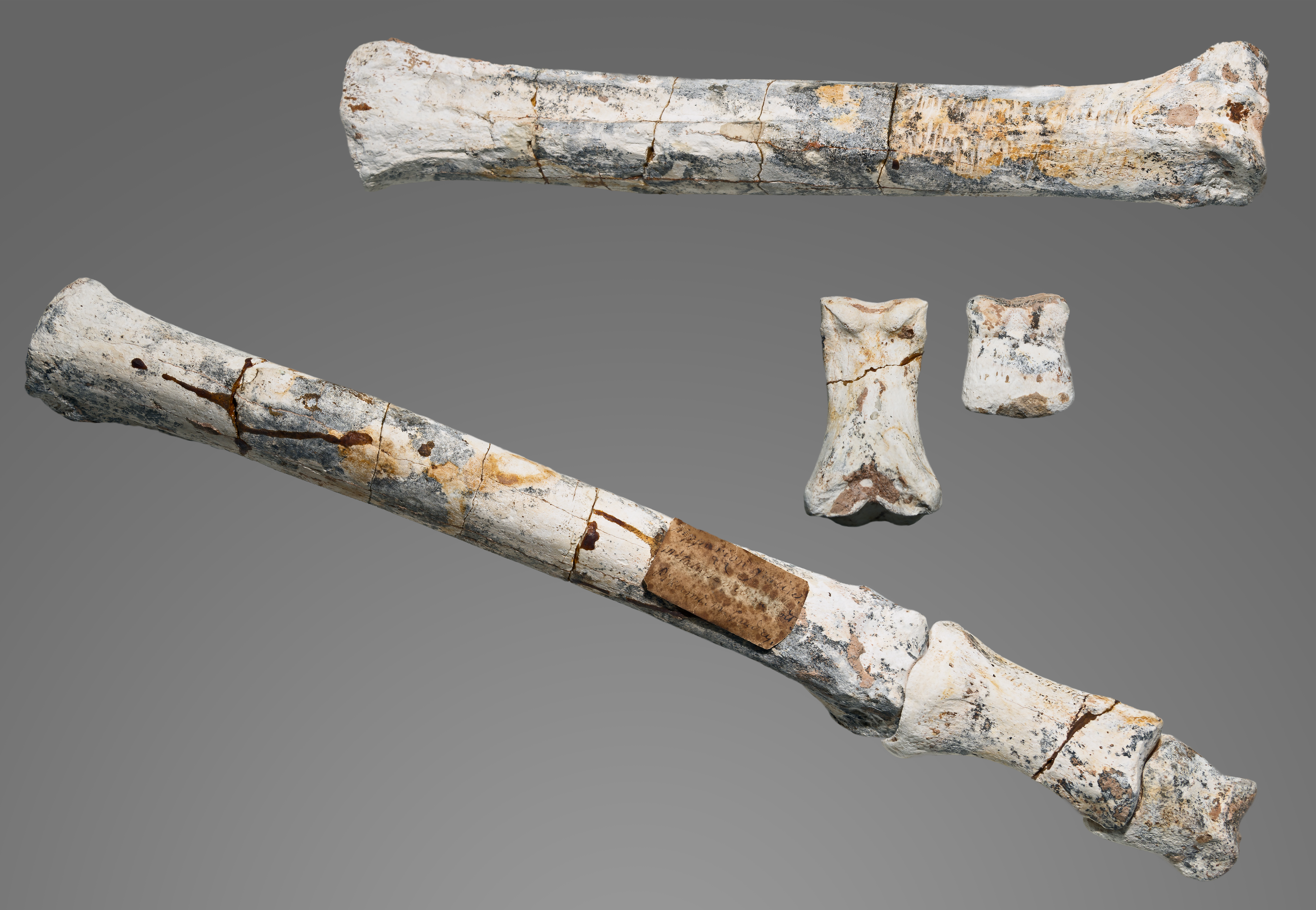
Metapodial

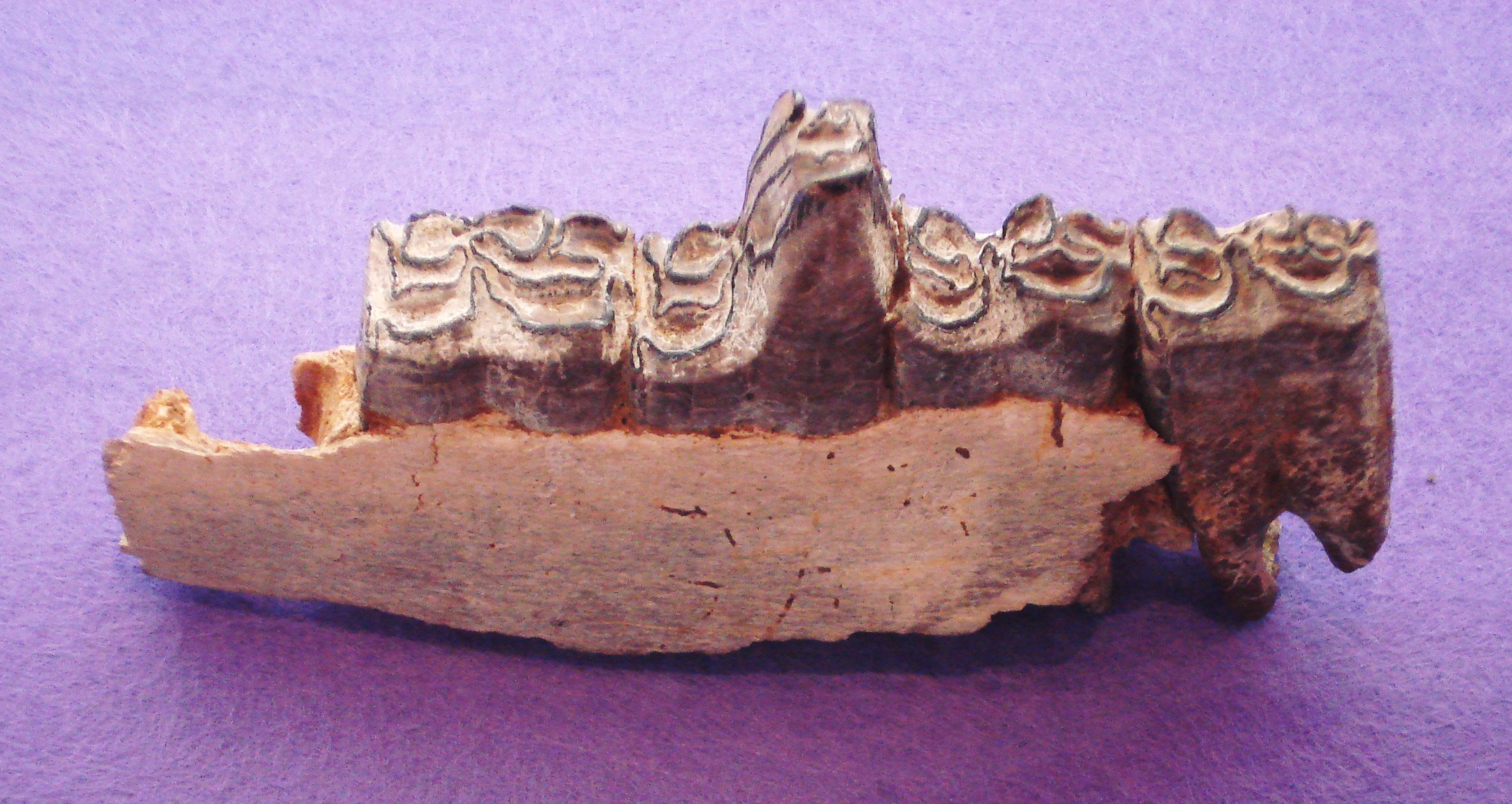

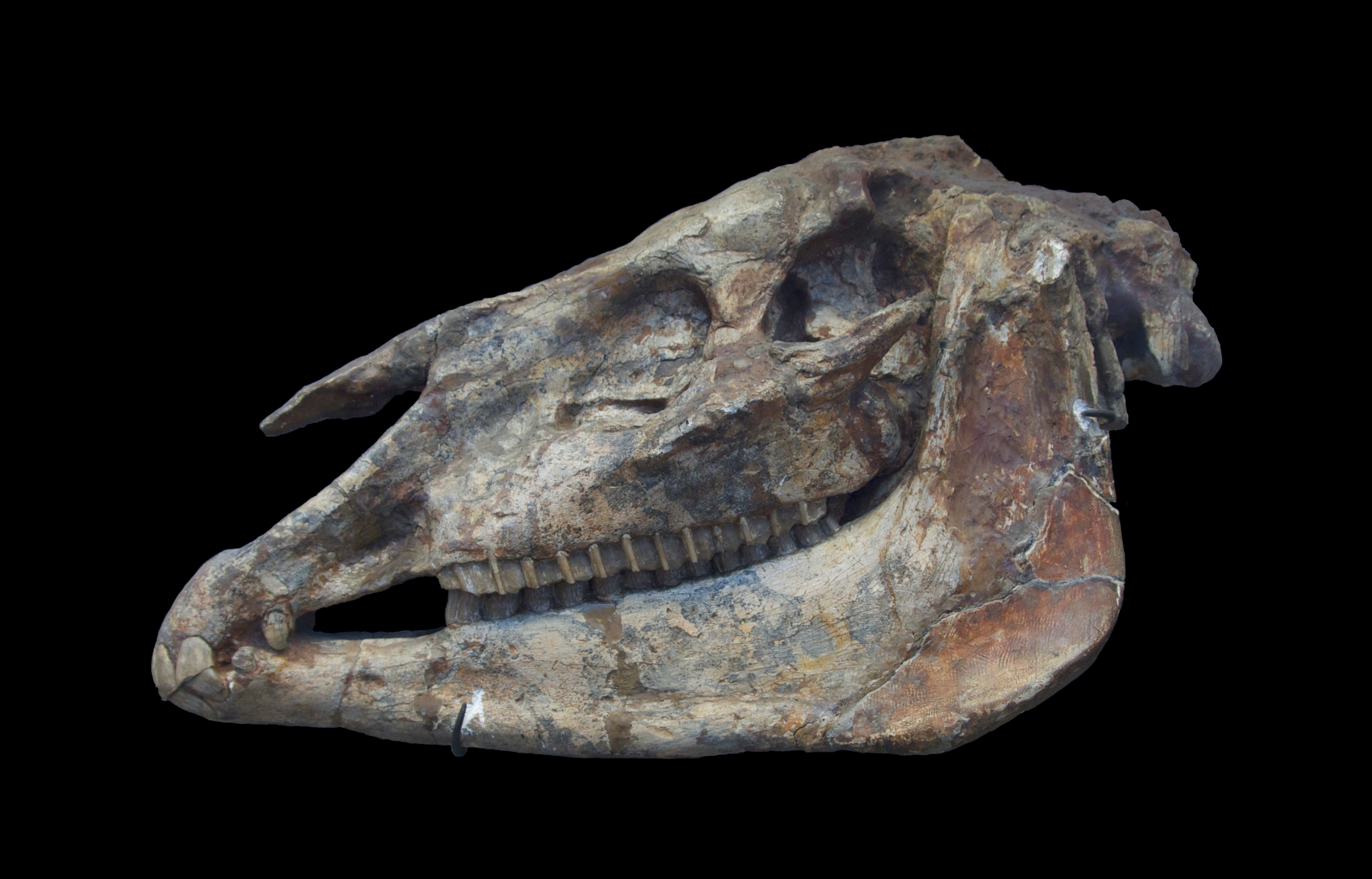
Skull

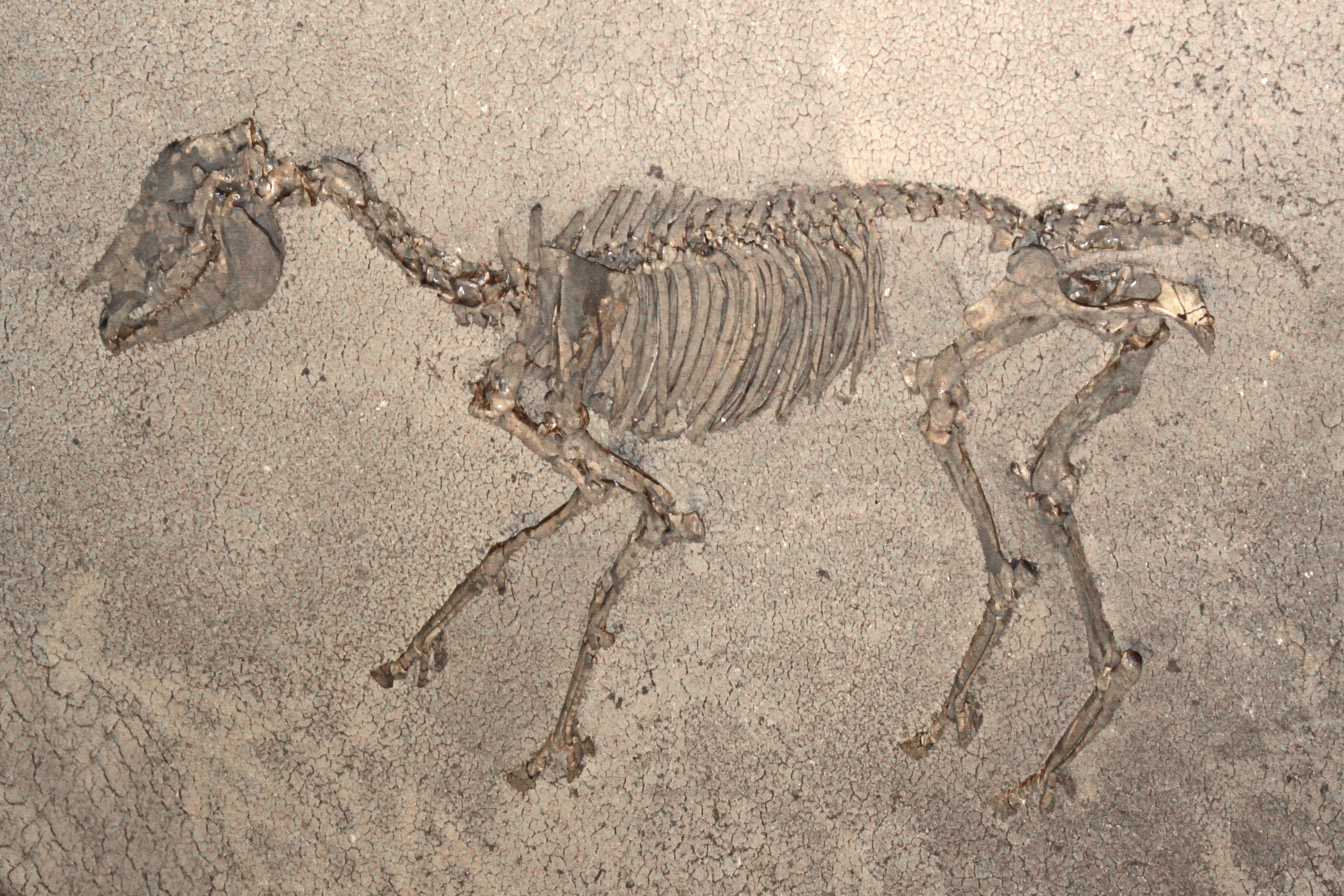
Skeleton of H. primigenius

The type species, H. primigenium, is known from Miocene deposits in Europe (e.g., the Hegau region in southern Germany) and the Middle East, while the species H. koenigswaldi and H. catalaunicum have been found in Miocene deposits in Spain. The Asian hipparionin "Hipparion" weihoense from early Late Miocene deposits in northern China has also been referred to the genus.

== Diet ==
H. primigenium was a generalist feeder which frequently browsed but could also exploit grasses. The dental mesowear of H. primigenium reveals that it lived in both open environments such as reed flats and closed environments such as mesophytic forests. In the arid Pannonian Basin System, Hippotherium is known to have migrated to make use of water sources with a high elevation origin, particularly from the nearby Vienna Basin.

== Fossil distribution ==
- Doue-la-Fontaine France estimated age: ~13.65—7.25 Mya.
- Lower Bakhtiari Formation, northern Iraq, estimated age: ~11.6—9.0 Mya.
- Kurtchuk-Tchekmedje, Turkey estimated age: ~11.61—5.33 Mya.
