= Christolea =

Scientific classification
- Kingdom: Plantae
- Clade: Tracheophytes
- Clade: Angiosperms
- Clade: Eudicots
- Clade: Rosids
- Order: Brassicales
- Family: Brassicaceae
- Genus: Christolea; Cambess.

Synonyms
- Acroschizocarpus Gombócz; Koelzia Rech.f.; Melanidion Greene

Genus of flowering plants

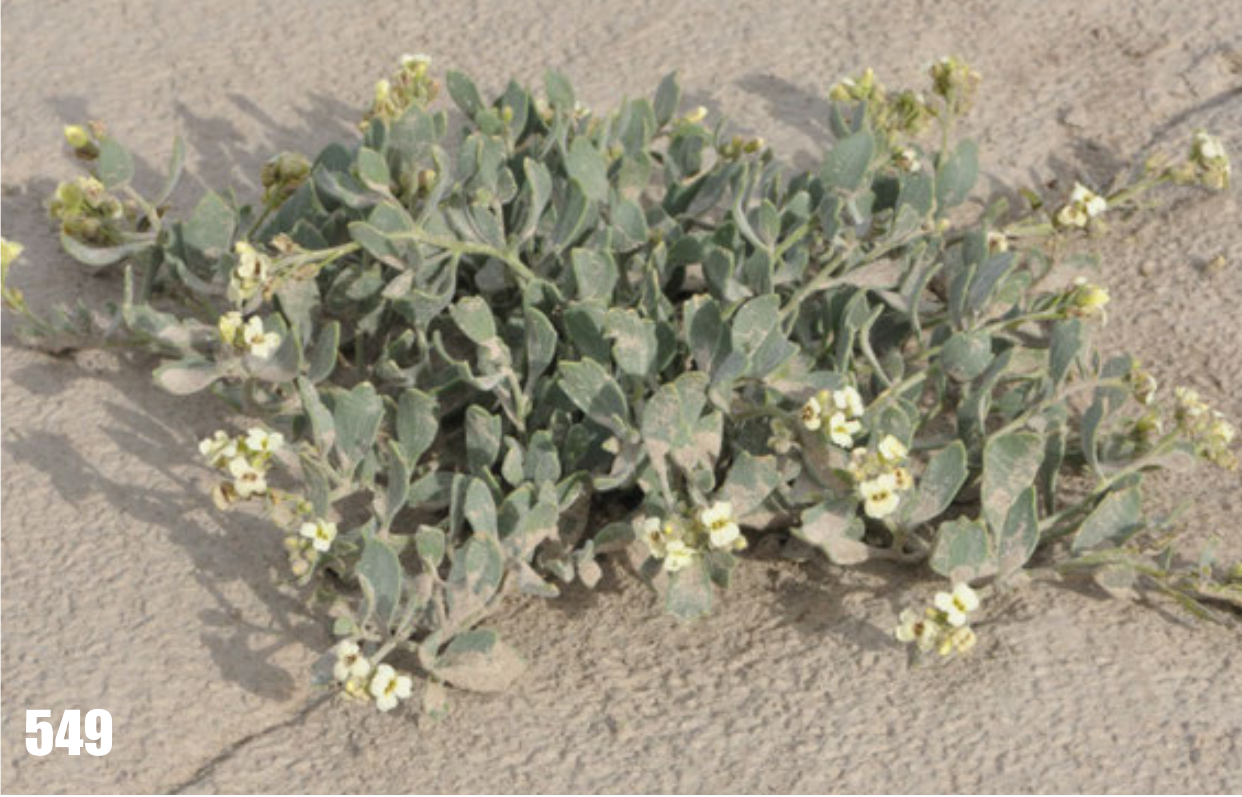
Christolea crassifolia, Tajikistan.

Christolea is a genus of flowering plants belonging to the family Brassicaceae. It includes three species which range from Afghanistan and Pakistan to Tajikistan, the Himalayas, Qinghai, and Xinjiang.

== Species ==
Three species are accepted.

- Christolea crassifolia Cambess.
- Christolea niyaensis Z.X.An
- Christolea pterosperma Al-Shehbaz
