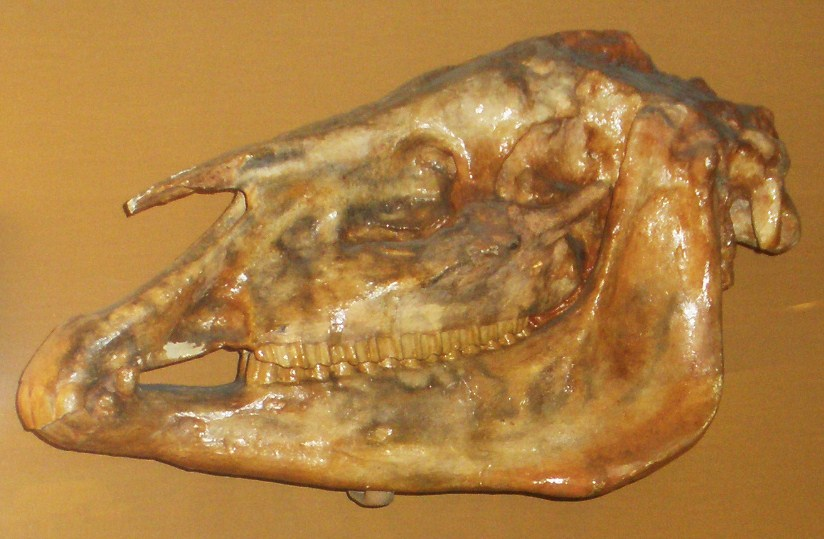
- C. mediterraneum skull

Scientific classification
- Kingdom: Animalia
- Phylum: Chordata
- Class: Mammalia
- Infraclass: Placentalia
- Order: Perissodactyla
- Family: incertae sedis
- Genus: †Cremohipparion; Qiu Zhanxiang, Huang Weilong & Guo Zhihui, 1987

Species
- Cremohipparion antelopinum; Cremohipparion forstenae; Cremohipparion matthewi; Cremohipparion mediterraneum

= Cremohipparion =

Cremohipparion Temporal range: Mid Miocene to Pliocene, 23–3.6 Ma

Extinct genus of mammals

Cremohipparion is an extinct genus of equid that lived in Eurasia and Africa during the Miocene through Pliocene.

Its habitat or biome consisted of non-forested, grassy plains, shortgrass prairie or steppes.

== Taxonomy ==
Cremohipparion was originally coined as a subgenus of Hipparion for a number of Eurasian species. Later, Bernor and Tobien (1989) elevated Cremohipparion to full generic status in their description of small hipparionin specimens from Samos, Greece.
