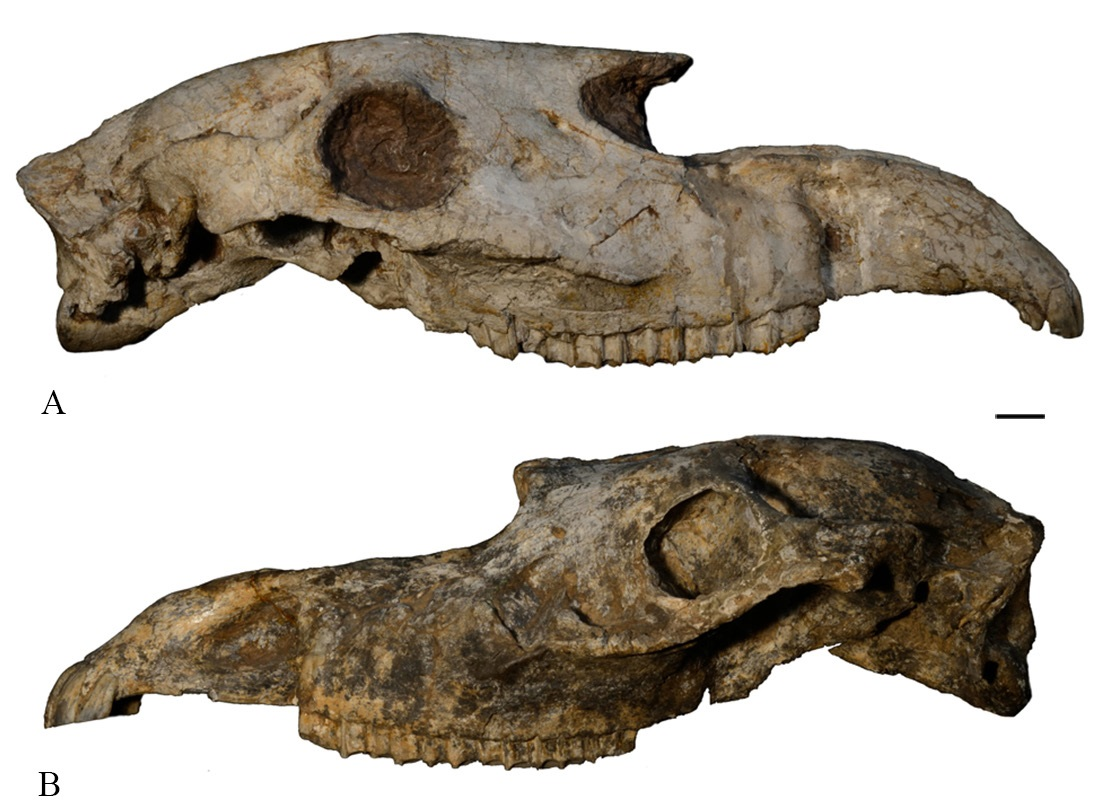
- Skulls of Proboscidipparion pater

Scientific classification
- Kingdom: Animalia
- Phylum: Chordata
- Class: Mammalia
- Infraclass: Placentalia
- Order: Perissodactyla
- Family: Equidae
- Subfamily: Equinae
- Tribe: †Hipparionini
- Genus: †Proboscidipparion; Sefve, 1927

Species
- †P. heintzi †P. pater †P. sinense

= Proboscidipparion =

Proboscidipparion Temporal range: Pliocene–Early Pleistocene

Extinct genus of mammals

Proboscidipparion is an extinct genus of hipparionine equine. It is named after its unusual retracted nasal region of the skull, which may have supported a proboscis. Fossils have been found throughout Eurasia, from England (Red Crag) to China. The oldest specimens are known from Asia, dating to the Early Pliocene, around 5.3-5 million years ago. The genus was one of the last surviving hipparionines, with the youngest specimen dating to the end of the Early Pleistocene, around 1 million years ago.
