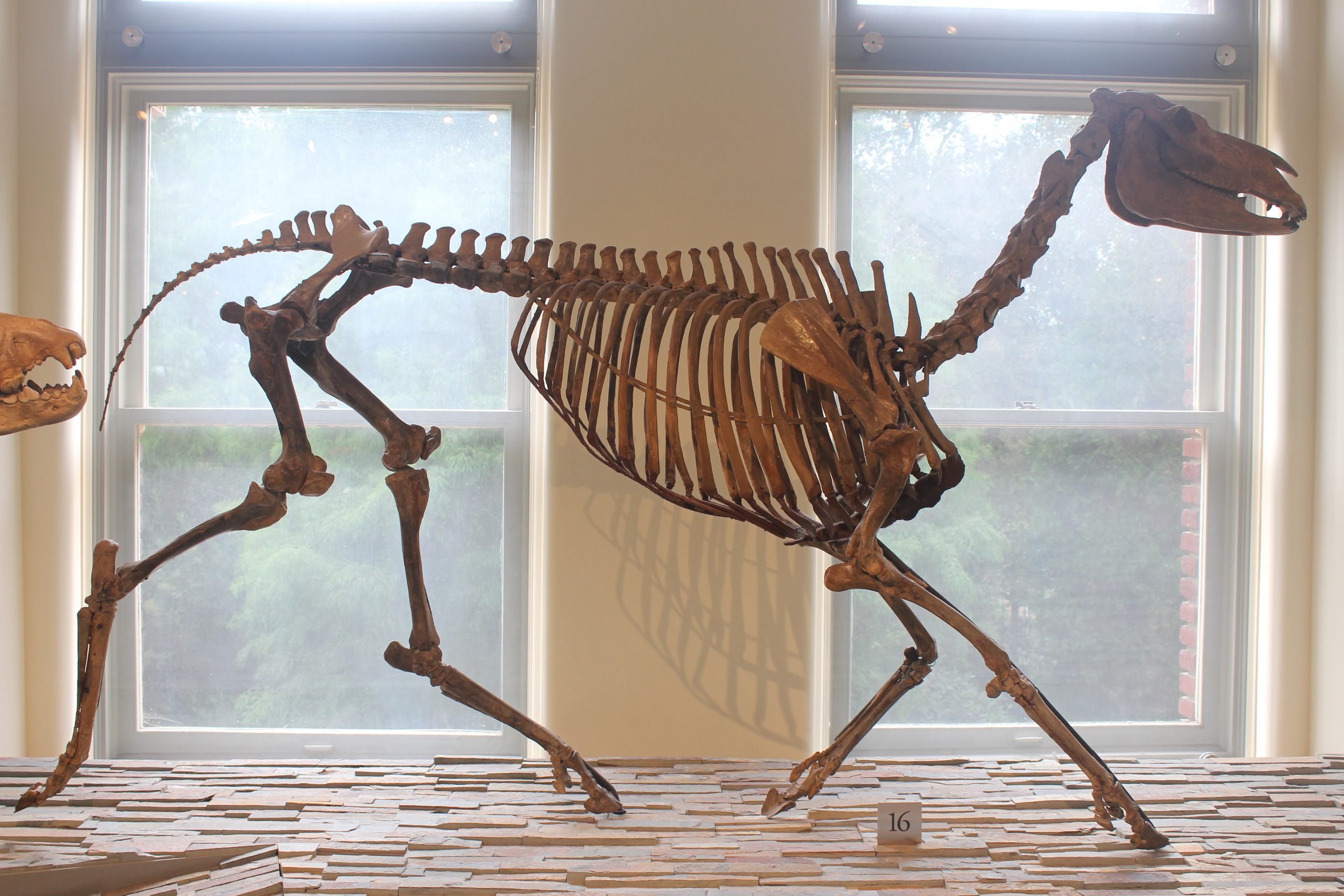
- Skeleton of N. leptode at the Natural History Museum of Los Angeles County

Scientific classification
- Kingdom: Animalia
- Phylum: Chordata
- Class: Mammalia
- Order: Perissodactyla
- Family: Equidae
- Subfamily: Equinae
- Tribe: †Hipparionini
- Genus: †Neohipparion; Gidley, 1903

Type species
- Neohipparion affine (Leidy, 1869)

Species
- N. affine (Leidy, 1869); N. eurystyle (Cope, 1893); N. gidleyi Merriam, 1915; N. leptode Merriam, 1915; N. trampasense Edwards, 1982

Synonyms
- Hesperohippus Dalquest, 1981

= Neohipparion =

Neohipparion Temporal range: Clarendonian-Hemphillian ~13.6–4.9 Ma

Extinct genus of mammals

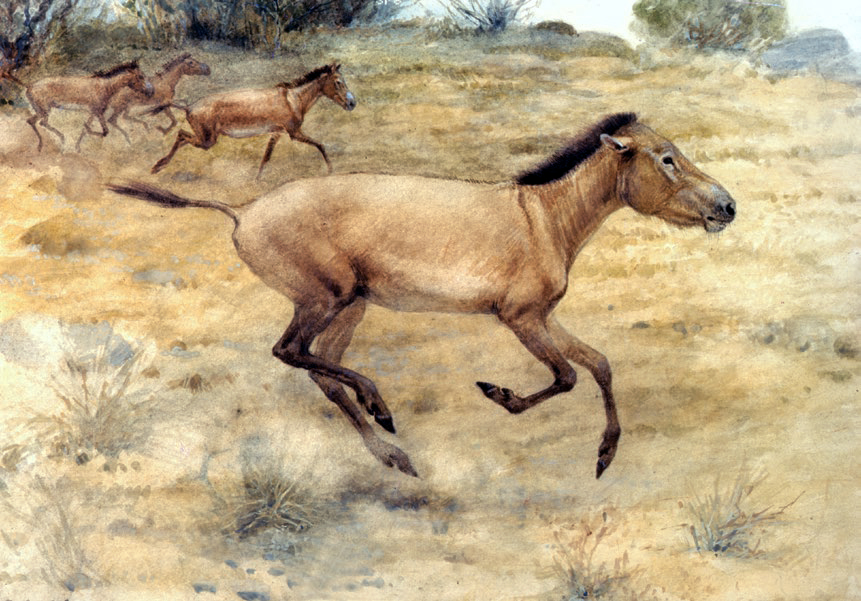
Restoration by Charles R. Knight

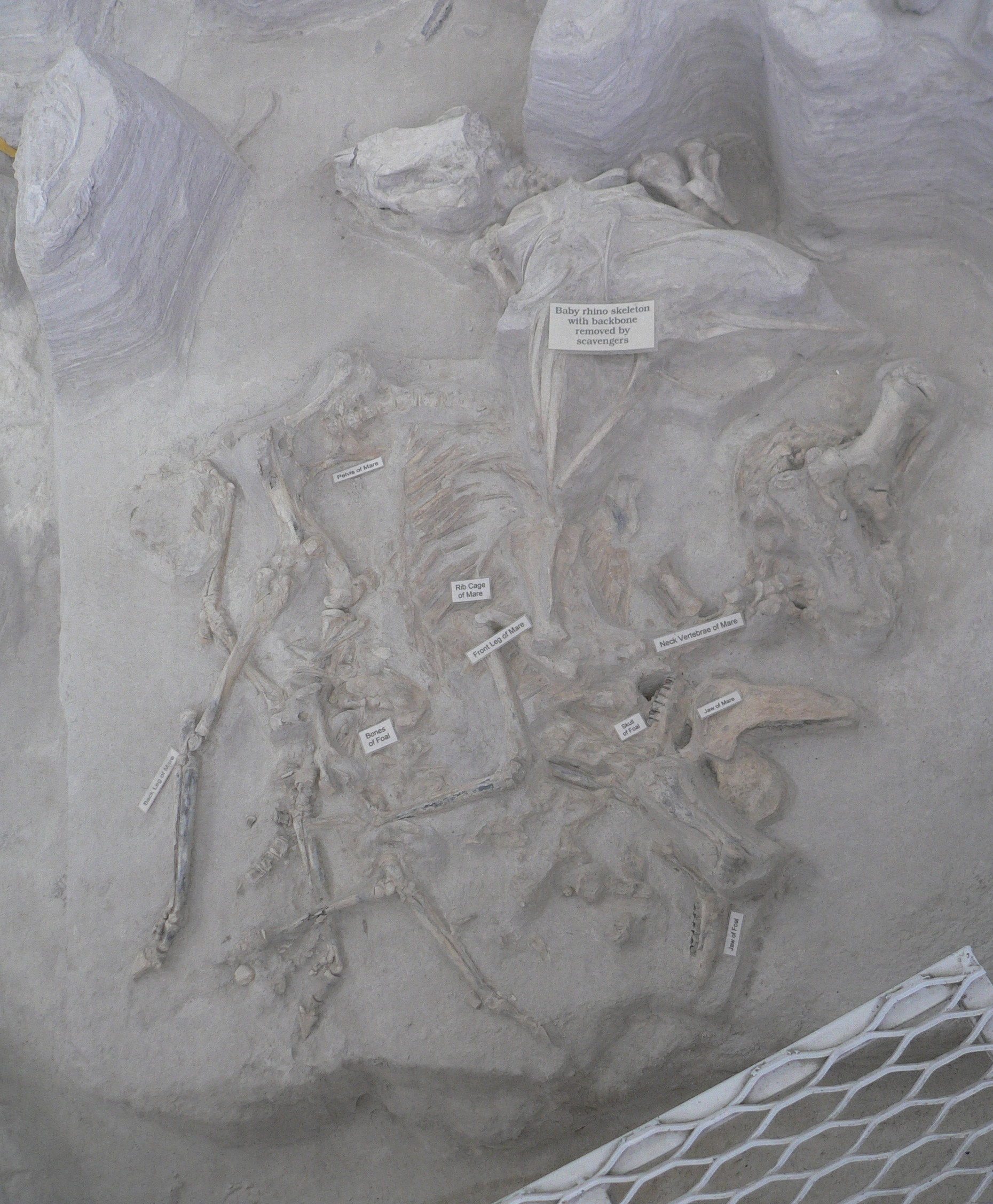
Mare and foal at Ashfall Fossil Beds

Neohipparion (Greek: "new" (neos), "pony" (hipparion)) is an extinct genus of equid, from the Neogene (Miocene to Pliocene) of North America and Central America.

== Distribution ==
Fossils of this horse have been found in Texas, Kansas, South Dakota, Montana, Nevada, Alabama, Florida, Oregon, and Mexico.

== Description ==
This prehistoric genus of hipparionin equid grew to lengths of up to 4.5 to 5 ft (1.4 to 1.5 m) long.

== Palaeoecology ==
=== Reproduction ===
In Florida, Neohipparion lived in a savanna environment during the dry season, but moved to a wet environment when it came time to mate. The average age of death for a newborn colt was 3.5 years, with a juvenile mortality rate of 64% during its first 2 years of existence. However, those that got past those for 2 years of life lived to be 8 years old before expiring.

=== Diet ===
δ^{13}C values of N. trampasense from the Love Bone Bed of Florida show it had a clear preference for foraging in open habitats. δ^{13}C values from N. eurystyle fossils found in Florida indicate that it fed almost exclusively on C_{4} grasses, while fossils of the same species from central Mexico indicate a more varied diet that consisted of both C_{3} and C_{4} plants.
