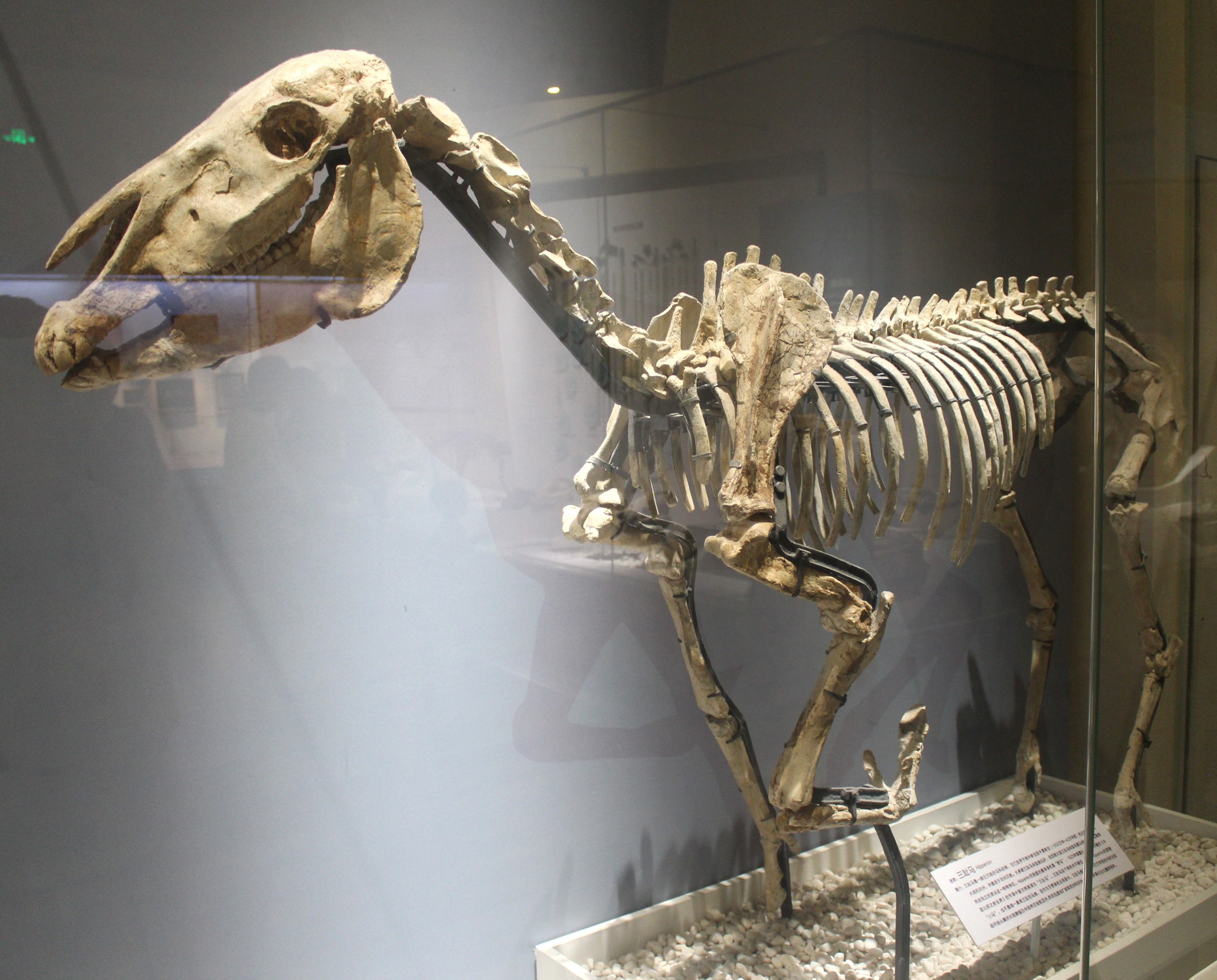
- Skeleton on display at the National Natural History Museum of China

Scientific classification
- Kingdom: Animalia
- Phylum: Chordata
- Class: Mammalia
- Order: Perissodactyla
- Family: Equidae
- Subfamily: Equinae
- Tribe: †Hipparionini
- Genus: †Hipparion; De Christol, 1832

Species
- See text

Synonyms
- Hemihipparion

= Hipparion =

Hipparion Temporal range: Late Miocene 9.9–5.3 Ma

Extinct genus of mammals

Hipparion is an extinct genus of three-toed, medium-sized equine belonging to the extinct tribe Hipparionini, which lived about 10-5 million years ago. While the genus formerly included most hipparionines, the genus is now more narrowly defined as hipparionines from Eurasia spanning the Late Miocene. Hipparion was a mixed-feeder who ate mostly grass, and lived in the savannah biome. Hipparion evolved from Cormohipparion, and went extinct due to environmental changes like cooling climates and decreasing atmospheric carbon dioxide levels.

== Taxonomy ==
=== "Hipparion" in sensu lato ===
The genus "Hipparion" was used for over a century as a form classification to describe over a hundred species of Holartic hipparionines from the Pliocene and Miocene eras that had three toes and isolated protocones. Since then, groups such as the genera Cormohipparion and Neohipparion were proposed to further sort these species, typically based on differences in skull morphology. These species are now known as "Hipparion" in sensu lato (s.l.), or a broad sense.

=== Hipparion in sensu stricto ===
Hipparion in sensu stricto (s.s.), or a strict sense, describes the genus of Old World hipparionines from remains found in Eurasia (France, Greece, Turkey, Iran, and China) from the Late Miocene era (~10-5 Ma, or million years ago). The assignment of remains from elsewhere to the genus, such as North America and Africa, is uncertain.

== Morphology ==
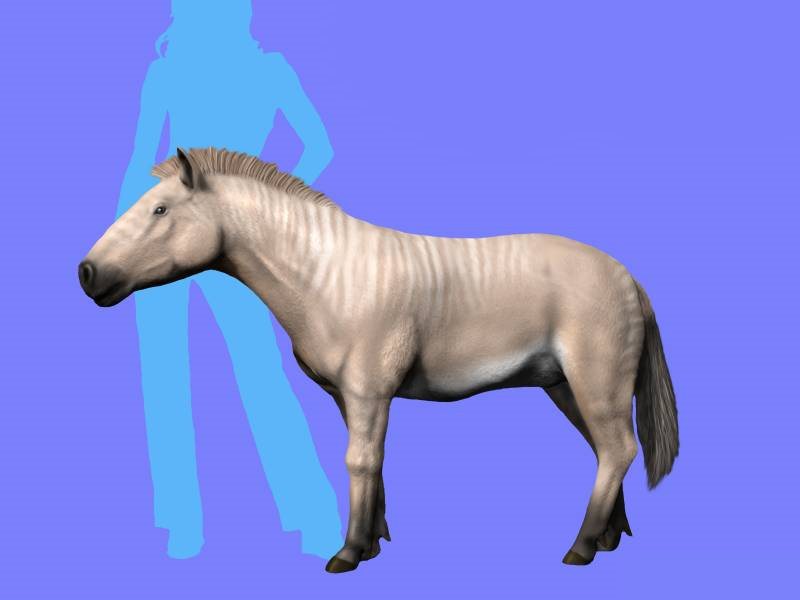
Life reconstruction of H. forcei

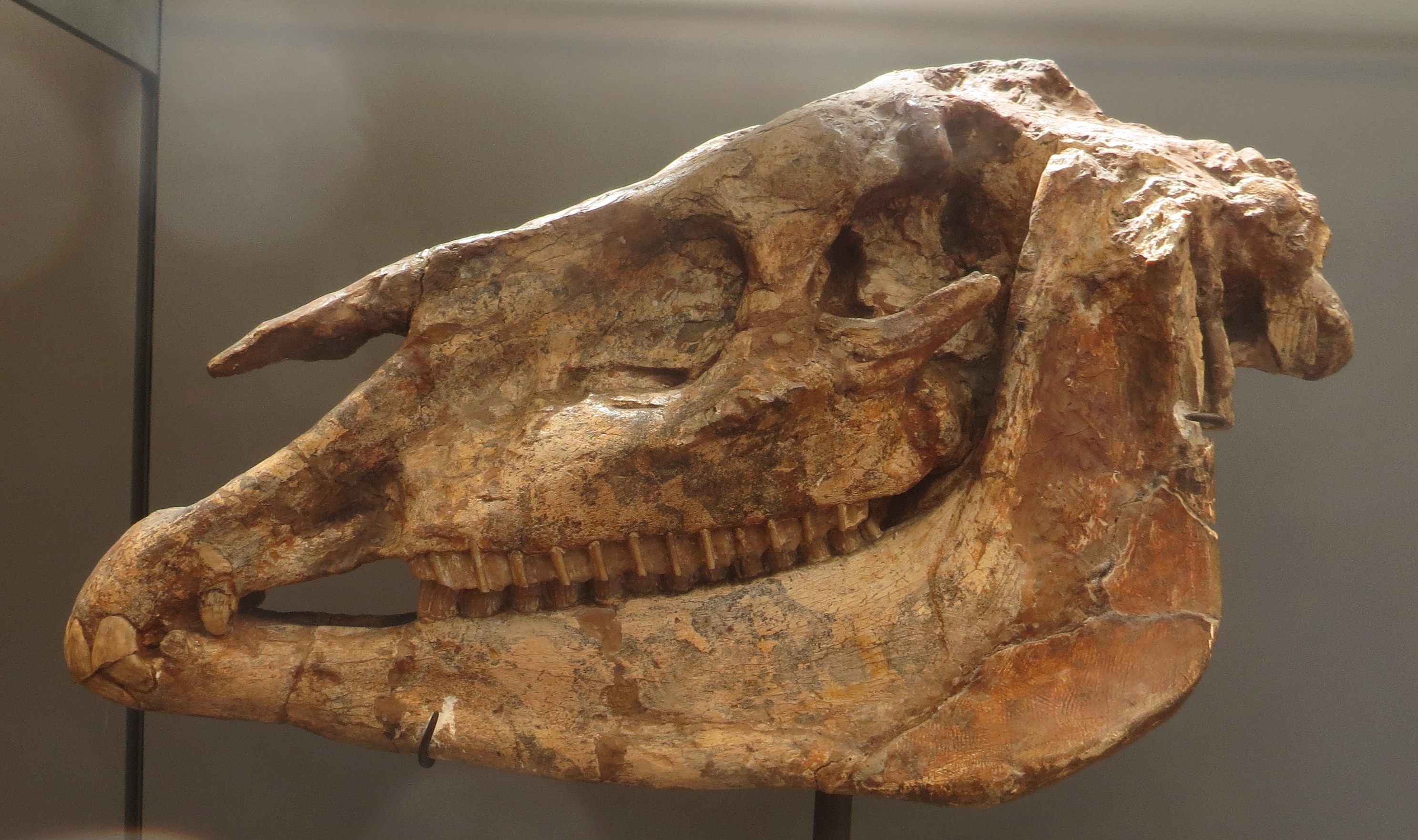
H. gracile skull

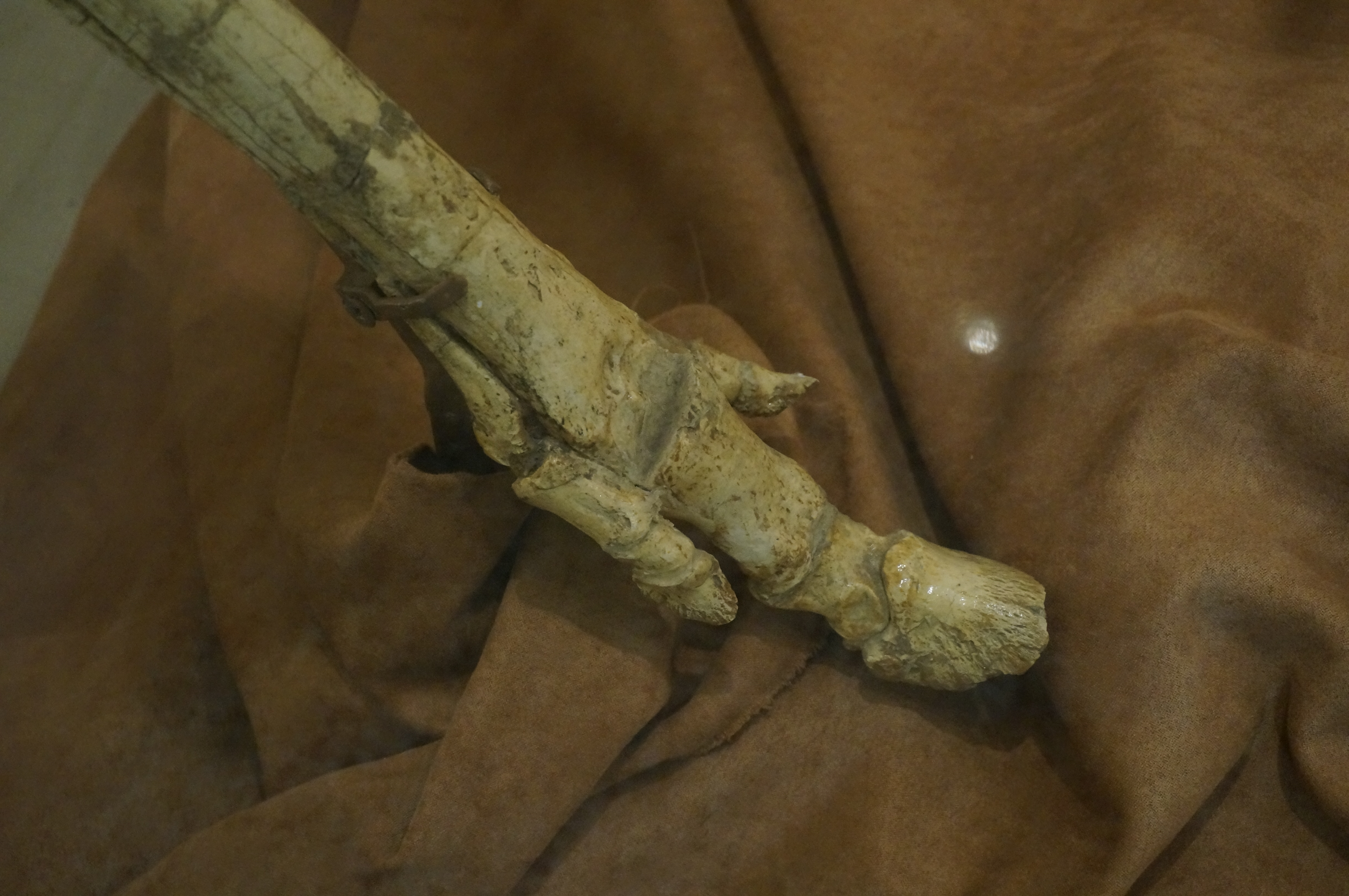
Three-toed Hipparion hind leg fossil

Hipparion generally resembled a smaller version of the modern horse, but was tridactyl, or three-toed. It had two vestigial outer toes on each limb in addition to its hoof. In some species, these outer toes were functional. Hipparion was typically medium in size, at about 1.4 m (4 ft 7 in) tall at the shoulder. The estimated body mass of Hipparion depends on the species, but ranges from about 135 to 200 kg (300 to 440 lb). Hipparion had hypsodont dentition (high-crowned teeth) for its premolars and molars, with a crown height of about 60 mm (2.36 in). Hipparion had isolated protocones in the upper molars, meaning a cusp of the teeth called a protocone was not connected to a tooth crest called a protoloph. Hipparion is also characterized by its facial fossa, or deep depression in the skull, located high on the head in front of the orbit.

== Paleobiology and paleoecology ==
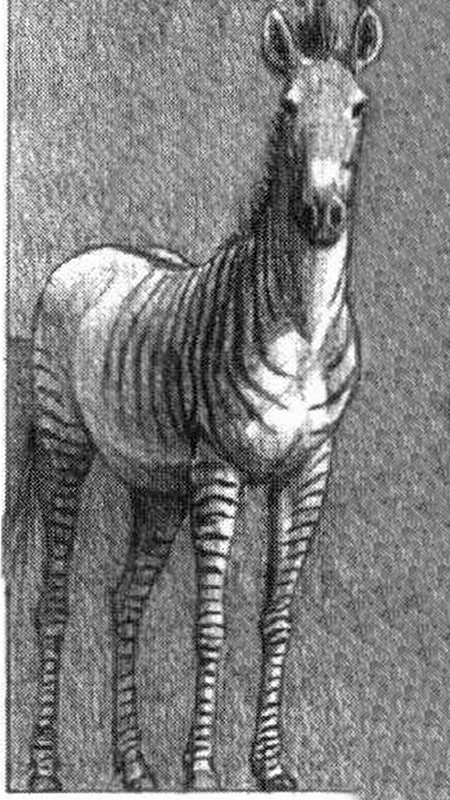
Mauricio Antón's illustration of Hipparion cornelianum that resembles a modern-day zebra

Hipparion lived in the Old World Savannah Biome, or OWSB, consisting of woodlands to grasslands. Hipparion ate a mixed-feed diet, mostly consisting of grass. This diet is indicated by fossil evidence of microscopic wear patterns of scratches and pits on the enamel of Hipparion's teeth, observed using scanning electron microscopy (SEM). Additionally, stable isotope analysis indicates that despite significant shifts in climatic seasonality, this genus maintained a diet predominantly composed of C3 plants.

Hipparion achieved skeletal maturity and possibly sexual maturity at about 3 years old. Fossils of Hipparion individuals are up to 10 years old at death.

Isotopic analysis indicates that in the late Miocene Batallones 3 fossil site in Spain, the sabertooth cats Promegantereon and Machairodus, the amphicyonids (bear-dogs) Magericyon and Thaumastocyon, the large mustelid Eomellivora and possibly the early omnivorous giant panda relative Indarctos likely considerably predated upon Hipparion.

== Evolution and extinction ==
Hipparion likely evolved from a species of Cormohipparion during the Late Miocene, about 11.4–11.0 Ma. This species, C. occidentale, came to Eurasia and Africa from North America. The last common ancestor of Hipparion and the modern horse was Merychippus.

In the Old World, Hipparion experienced population decline and extinction down a North to South gradient, as did many other Miocene vertebrates. This trend is believed to be due to environmental changes caused by global cooling and decreasing carbon dioxide levels in the atmosphere.

== In culture ==
Bones and teeth of Hipparion were widely historically excavated in China as "dragon bones" to be used as ingredients in Traditional Chinese Medicine, under the belief the represented the remains of Chinese dragons.

== Species ==
- H. chiai Liu et al., 1978
- H. concudense Pirlot, 1956
- H. condoni Merrian, 1915
- H. crassum Gervais, 1859
- H. dietrichi Wehrli, 1941
- H. forcei Richey, 1948
- H. gromovae Villalta and Crusafont, 1957
- H. laromae Pesquero et al., 2006
- H. lufengense Sun, 2013
- H. macedonicum Koufos, 1984
- H. matthewi Abel, 1926
- H. mediterraneum Roth and Wagner, 1855
- H. molayanense Zouhri, 1992
- H. minus Pavlow, 1890
- H. periafricanum Villalta and Crusafont, 1957
- H. philippus Koufos & Vlachou, 2016
- H. phlegrae Lazaridis and Tsoukala, 2014
- H. prostylum Gervais, 1849 (type)
- H. rocinantis Pacheco, 1921
- H. sellardsi Matthew and Stirton, 1930
- H. shirleyae MacFadden, 1984
- H. sithonis Koufos & Vlachou, 2016
- H. sitifense Pomel, 1897
- H. tchicoicum Ivanjev, 1966
- H. tehonense (Merriam, 1916)
- H. theniusi Melentis, 1969
- H. venustum Leidy, 1860
