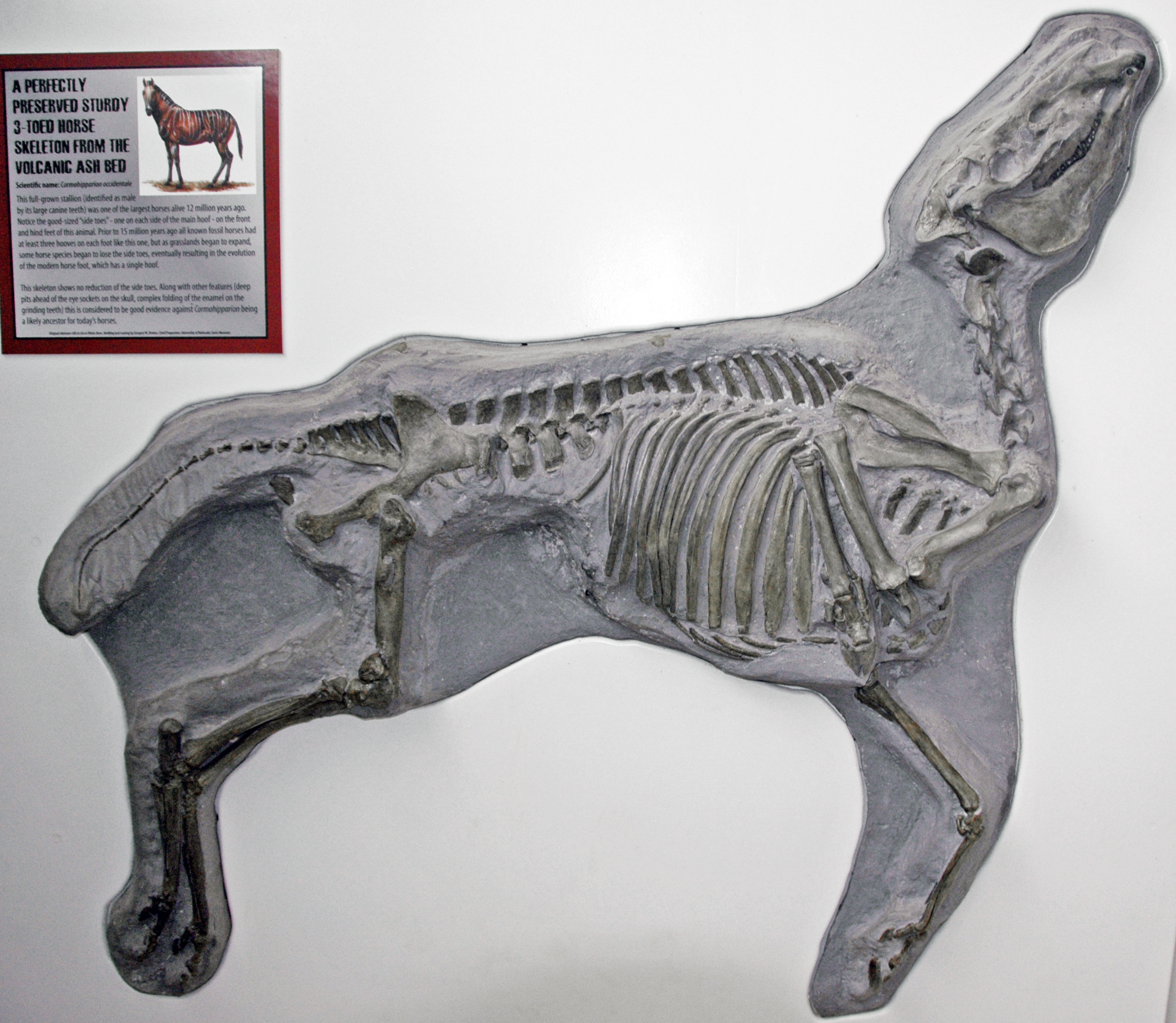
- C. occidentale skeleton

Scientific classification
- Kingdom: Animalia
- Phylum: Chordata
- Class: Mammalia
- Order: Perissodactyla
- Family: Equidae
- Subfamily: Equinae
- Tribe: †Hipparionini
- Genus: †Cormohipparion; Skinner & MacFadden, 1977

Type species
- †Hipparion occidentale

Subgenera and species
- †Cormohipparion: †C. (C.) cappadocium Bernor, 2024; †C. (C.) fricki Woodburne, 2007; †C. (C.) goorisi MacFadden & Skinner, 1981; †C. (C.) johnsoni Woodburne, 2007; †C. (C.) matthewi Woodburne, 2007; †C. (C.) merriami Woodburne, 2007; †C. (C.) occidentale (Leidy, 1856) (type); †C. (C.) sofularensis Parildar et al., 2025; †C. (C.) quinni Woodburne, 1996; †C. (C.) skinneri Woodburne, 2007; †Notiocradohipparion: †C. (N.) plicatile (Leidy, 1887); †C. (N.) ingenuum (Leidy, 1885); †C. (N.) emsliei Hulbert, 1988

= Cormohipparion =

Cormohipparion Temporal range: Mid Miocene-Early Pliocene (Hemphillian–Blancan) ~15.97–3.6 Ma

Extinct genus of horse

Cormohipparion (Greek: "noble" (cormo), "pony" (hipparion)) is an extinct genus of horse belonging to the tribe Hipparionini that lived in North America and Eurasia during the Late Miocene to Pliocene (Hemphillian to Blancan in the NALMA classification). They grew up to 3 feet (0.91 meters) long.

== Taxonomy ==
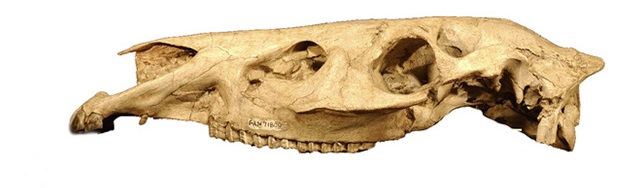
Skull

The genus Cormohipparion was coined for the extinct hipparionin horse "Equus" occidentale, described by Joseph Leidy in 1856. However it was soon argued that the partial material fell within the range of morphological variation seen in Hipparion, and that the members of Cormohipparion belonged instead within Hipparion. This rested on claims that pre-orbital morphology did not have any taxonomic significance, a claim that detailed study of quarry sections later showed to be false. The genus was originally identified by a closed off preorbital fossa, but later examinations of the cheek teeth, specifically the lower cheek teeth, of Cormohipparion specimens found that they were indeed valid and distinct from Hipparion. A reappraisal of many horse genera was thus conducted in 1984, and the proposed synonymy was not acknowledged by later literature. C. ingenuum holds the distinction for being the first prehistoric horse to be described in Florida, as well as being one of the most common species of extinct three-toed horses found to be in Florida, lasting until the early Pliocene. Cormohipparion emsliei has the distinction of being the last hipparion horse known from the fossil record.

The genus is considered to represent an ancestor to Hippotherium. Its fossils have been recovered from as far south as Mexico. Fossils have been found in the Great Plains and Rio Grande regions of North America, Mexico, Florida, and Texas, which shows that they were herding animals. Fossils have been unearthed in California, Louisiana, Nebraska, South Dakota, Honduras, Costa Rica and Panama. Fossils have also been found in India and Turkey.

== Evolution ==
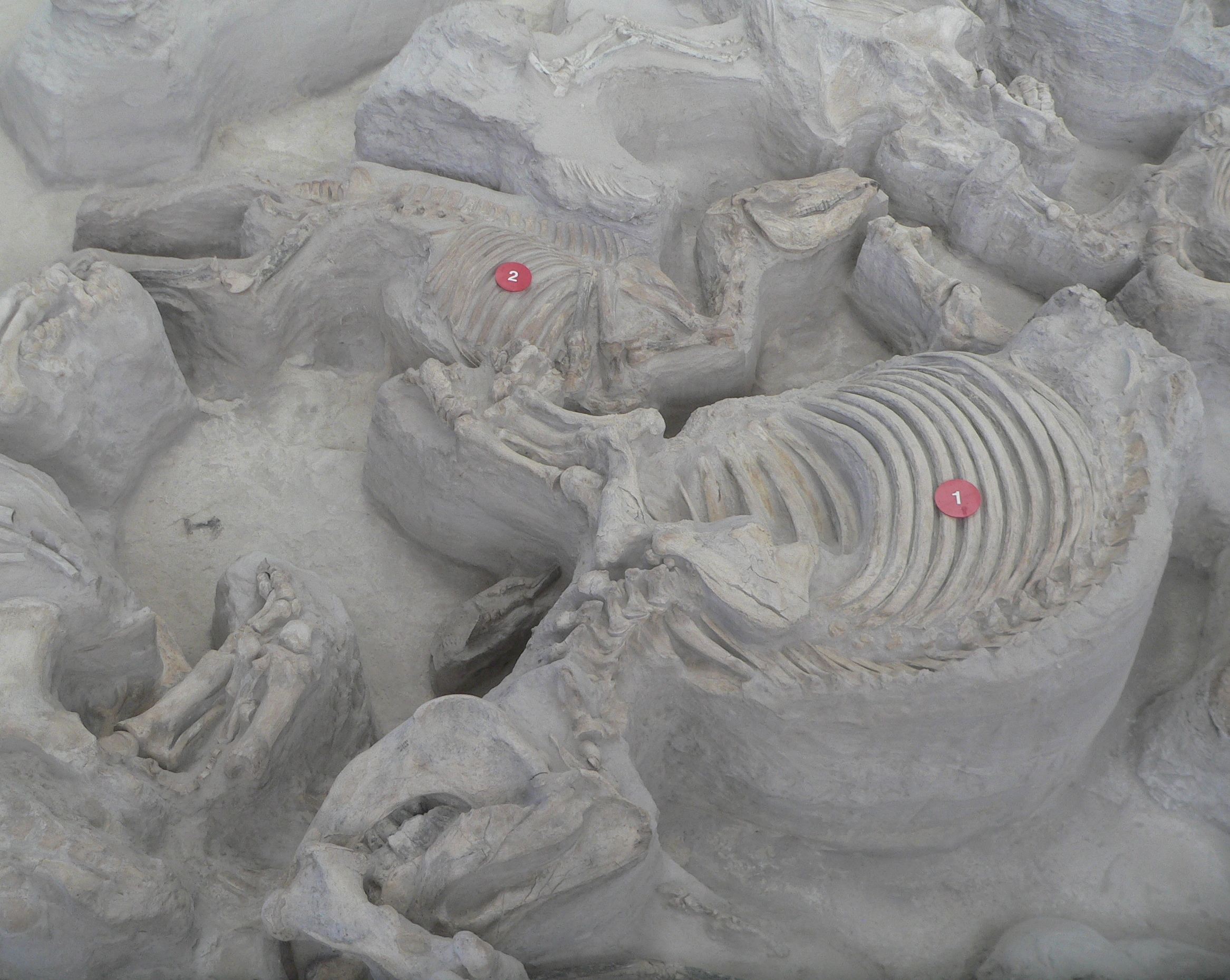
Skeletons of Cormohipparion and Teleoceras from the Ashfall Fossil Beds

A species of Cormohipparion closely related to C. occidentale is thought to have crossed the Bering land Bridge over into Eurasia around 11.4 to 11 million years ago, becoming the ancestor to Old World hipparionines.

== Palaeoecology ==
Paired dental mesowear and δ^{13}C analysis points to C. emsliei having a hypergeneralised diet consisting of both grazing and browsing.
