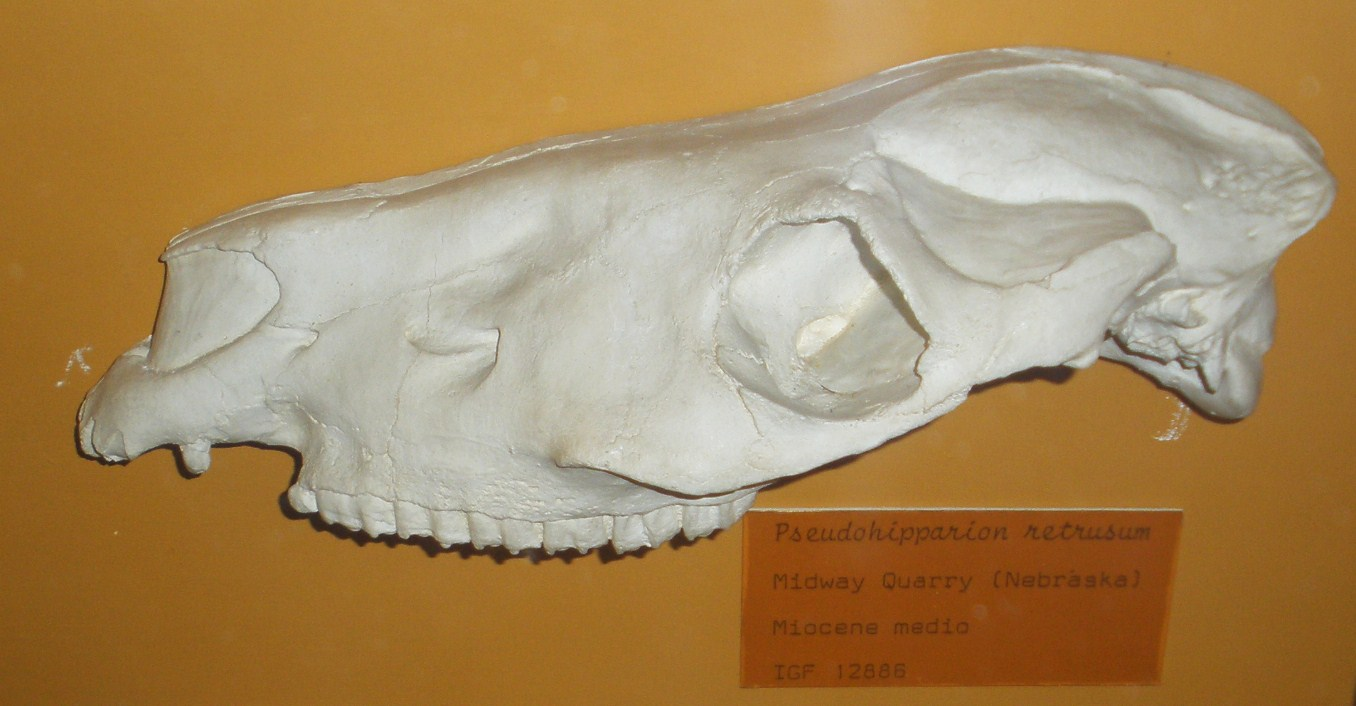
- Pseudhipparion retrusum skull, Museo di Paleontologia di Firenze

Scientific classification
- Kingdom: Animalia
- Phylum: Chordata
- Class: Mammalia
- Order: Perissodactyla
- Family: Equidae
- Subfamily: Equinae
- Tribe: †Hipparionini
- Genus: †Pseudhipparion; Ameghino, 1904

Species
- P. curtivallum (Quinn, 1955); P. gratum (Leidy, 1869); P. hessei Webb and Hulbert, Jr., 1986; P. retrusum (Cope, 1889) (type); P. simpsoni Webb and Hulbert, Jr., 1986; P. skinneri Webb and Hulbert, Jr., 1986

= Pseudhipparion =

Pseudhipparion Temporal range: Barstovian–Hemphillian ~15.97–5.3 Ma

Extinct genus of mammals

Pseudhipparion is an extinct genus of three-toed horse endemic to North America during the early to late Miocene. They were herding animals whose diet consisted of C3 plants, implying that they were grazers. Fossils of Pseudhipparion have been found in Georgia, Florida, Oregon, Montana, Kansas, Texas, Nebraska, and South Dakota indicate that it was a lightweight horse, weighing up to 90 pounds (40 kilograms). In 2005, fossils were unearthed in Oklahoma. Seven species of Pseudhipparion are known from the fossil record, which were very small, following the trend of Bergmann's rule.
