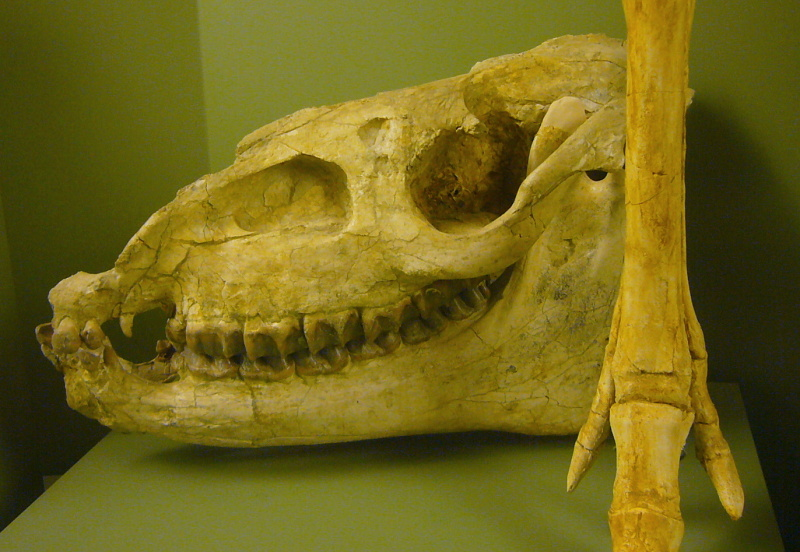
- Megahippus mckennai fossils

Scientific classification
- Kingdom: Animalia
- Phylum: Chordata
- Class: Mammalia
- Order: Perissodactyla
- Family: Equidae
- Subfamily: †Anchitheriinae
- Genus: †Megahippus; McGrew, 1938

Species
- M. matthewi; M. mckennai

= Megahippus =

Megahippus Temporal range: 16.3–10.3 Ma Barstovian to Late Clarendonian

Extinct genus of mammals

Megahippus is an extinct genus of large Anchitheriine horses found throughout the southern portion of the United States during the middle Miocene. The animal represents one of the latest low-crowned horses, overlapping in time with more derived high-crowned horses.

== Description ==
=== Dentition ===
Though generally similar to other genera within the subfamily, Megahippus is unique in the presence of a well defined ridge across the inner edge of the premolars 1-3 along with the presence of large, frontward-facing lower incisors. Unlike the incisors of other anchitheriines like Hypohippus, they would have been large and high-crowned. Between the two species, there is evidence of a trend of their premolars shrinking over time, with them being larger proportionally in M. mckennai. Both Megahippus and Hypohippus show a general trend in the increase in frequency of conchets in their upper cheek teeth potentially due to the segregation of the section when compared to the earlier Anchitherium.

=== Crania ===
Megahippus is generally comparable with other genera in the subfamily, having a short premaxilla that constricts before the first premolar. The infra-orbital fossa is located about the P4 with the facial fossa positioned above and behind the infra-orbital fossa. The placement of the facial fossa more similar to the more basal Archaeohippus than the closely related Hypohippus.

=== Postcrania ===
The limb morphology of Megahippus is similar to those seen in living equines, having adaptations towards the restricted movement of the fetlock. Thought this seems to be a convergent adaption related to the support of larger body masses. The ungual of larger anchitheriins like Megahippus was also similar to Equus which would have given the animal a more rounded phalanx then smaller smaller genera. Unlike modern horses, the feet of Megahippus and other anchitheriins were tridactyl. The estimated body masses of the species of the genus are 194.9 kg (430 lb) for M. mckennai and 266.2 kg (587 lb) for M. matthewi.

== Paleobiology ==
Based on wear and morphology seen in the incisors of Megahippus, this animal was a more specialized browser than other genera. During the time that the animal lived, the number of equid species in North America had massively decreased with only a few species being found throughout the continent and these species not being many numerous in their ecosystems.
