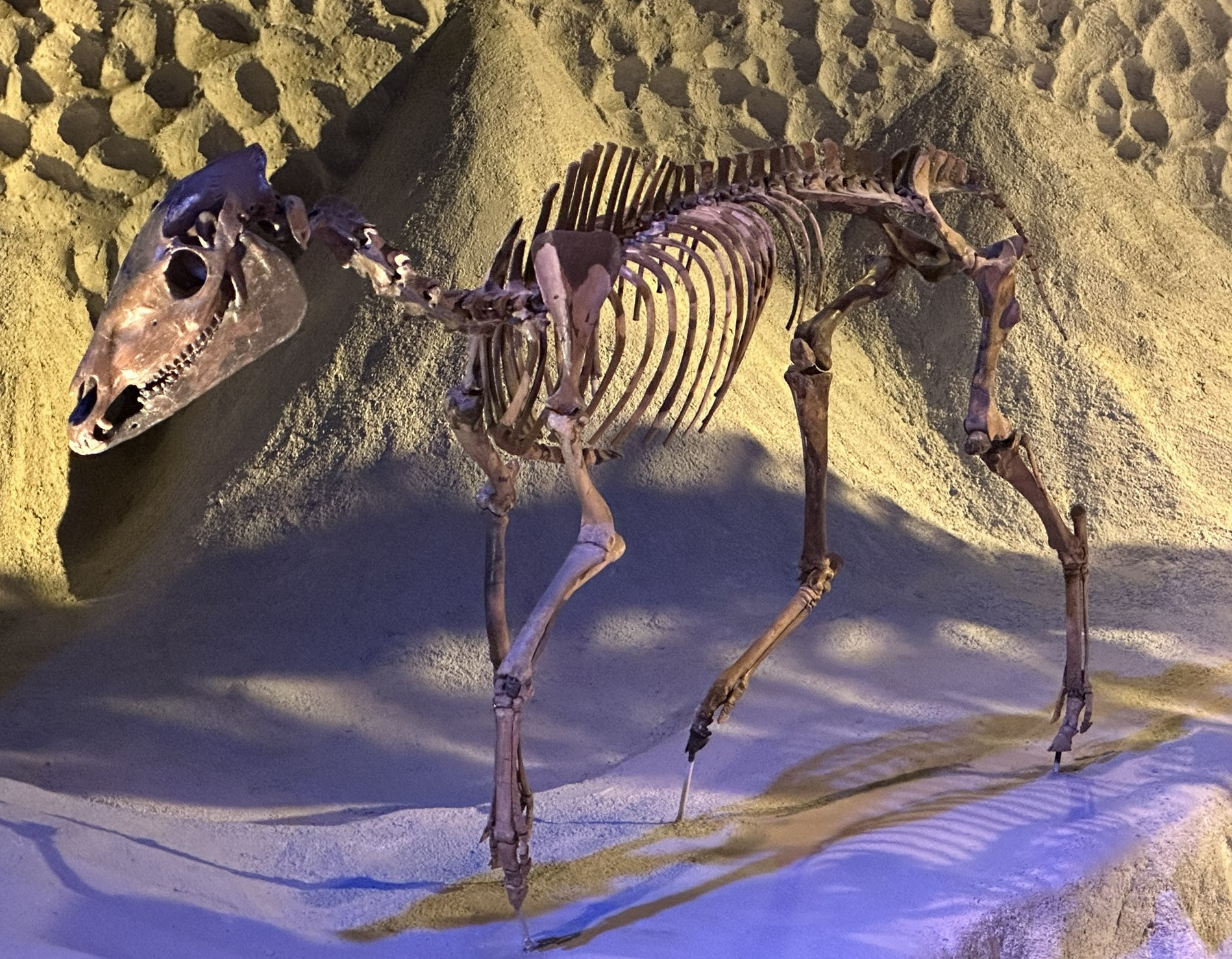
- Reconstructed skeleton, Florida Museum of Natural History

Scientific classification
- Kingdom: Animalia
- Phylum: Chordata
- Class: Mammalia
- Infraclass: Placentalia
- Order: Perissodactyla
- Family: Equidae
- Genus: †Parahippus
- Species: †P. leonensis

Binomial name
- †Parahippus leonensis Sellards, 1916

= Parahippus leonensis =

Parahippus leonensis Temporal range: 23.03–16.3 Million years ago

Extinct species of mammal

Parahippus leonensis is an extinct proto-horse of the family Equidae that was endemic to North America during the Miocene from 23.03 to 16.3 million years ago, living for approximately 6.73 million years.

Parahippus leonensis was named for Leon or more specifically Leon County, Florida.

== Taxonomy ==
Parahippus leonensis was named by Sellards (1916). Its type specimen is FGS 5084. Its type locality is Griscom Plantation site, which is in a Miocene marine limestone in the Torreya Formation of Florida. It was recombined as Hippodon leonensis by Quinn (1955); it was considered a nomen dubium by Macdonald (1992).

== Origin ==
Parahippus leonensis was the next step in evolution after Miohippus. Parahippus means "side horse" and has been called the evolutionary link between the older forest-dwelling horses and modern plains-dwelling grazers. It is believed to be a close relative to the group from which modern horses evolved. Side may refer to side branches on the posterior crest of the upper molars which separated Parahippus from Anchitherium.

This genus of horses had a long head with eyes situated back from the middle of the skull. It had three toes, like other primitive horses, however Parahippus leonensis had smaller side toes. It was a common species from the Great Plains to Florida. Parahippus leonensis weighed in at about 72.5 kg (160 pounds).

Parahippus leonensis was very likely the prey of Amphicyon or bear-dog, and dog-like Temnocyon.
