= Leon County, Florida paleontological sites =

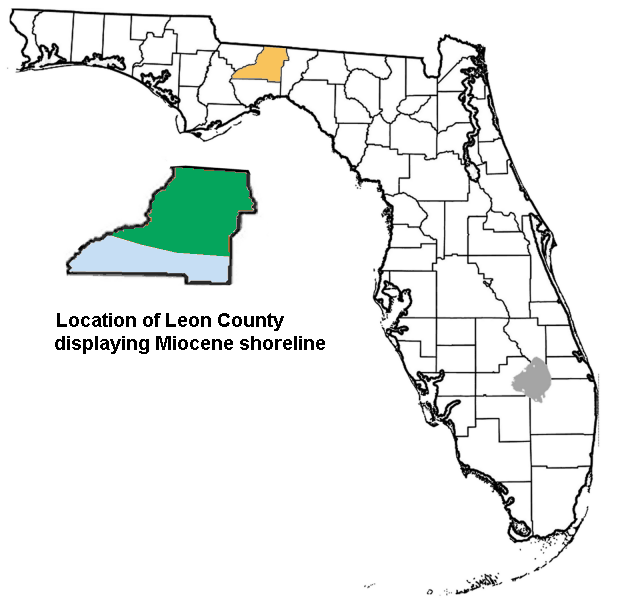
Leon County, Florida displaying Miocene shoreline according to the Florida Geologic Survey.

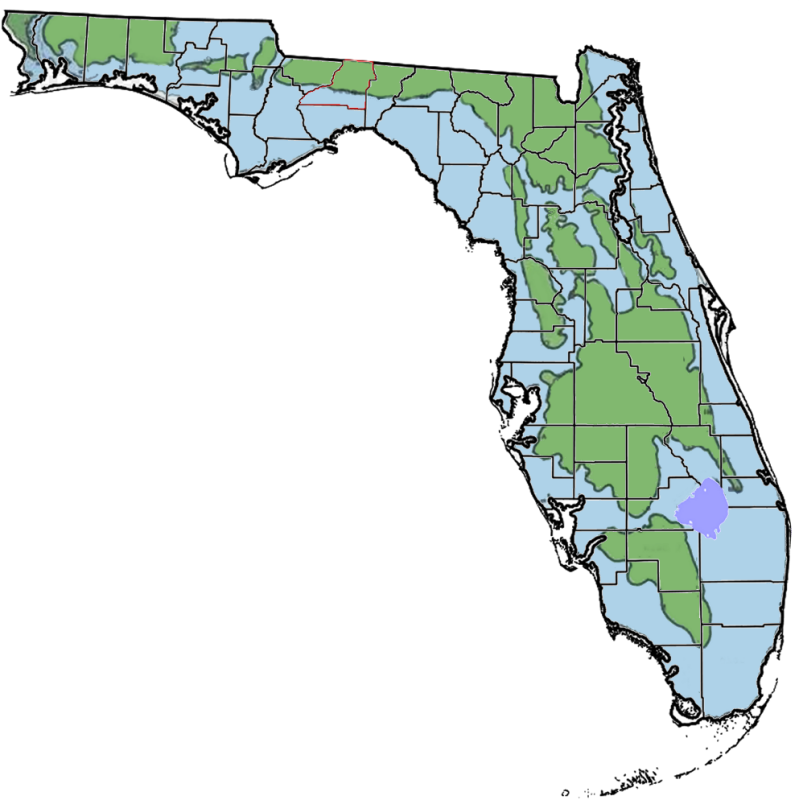
Florida during the Miocene

The Leon County paleontological sites are assemblages of Early Miocene invertebrates and vertebrates of Leon County, Florida, United States.

== Age ==
Era: Neogene.
Period: Early Miocene.
Faunal stage: Arikareean, ~23.1–21.9 Ma, calculates to a period of approximately 1.2 million years.
Geological Formation: Torreya Formation.

== Sites ==
Leon County paleontological sites are represented by the following:

- Griscom Plantation Site. Located in Killearn Lakes Plantation, south-southeast of Lake Iamonia on the southeast most section of Luna Plantation during a well drilling operation. Time period: ~23.6–18.8 Ma. (AEO).

Coordinates: 30.5655°N 84.2162°W

- Seaboard Air Line Railroad Site. Location was south of the center of Tallahassee during a dredging operation for a roadway. Time period: ~21.7 Ma. (AEO, Alroy).

Coordinates: 30.3°N 84.2°W

- St. Marks River site. Located along the St. Marks River in southern Leon County. Time period: ~23.1–21.9 Ma. (AEO, Alroy).

Coordinates: 30.3°N 84.2°W

- Tallahassee Waterworks Sites. Locations were just south of the center of Tallahassee. Time period: ~23.03–15.99 Ma.

Coordinates: 30.4°N 84.3°W

  - USGS 2302
  - USGS 3423 a.k.a. J.C. Henderson's well
  - USGS 395

Griscom Plantation Site = GPS. Seaboard Air Line Railroad = SALR. St. Marks River site = SMRS. Tallahassee Waterworks Site = TWWS.

== Specimens ==
=== Invertebrates ===
- Anomia suwaneensis (bivalve) TWWS 3424
- Chlamys (scallop) TWWS 2302
- Ostrea normalis (oyster) SALR
- Lucina janus (bivalve) TWWS 2302
- Mercenaria langdoni TWWS 395
- Metis chipolana (bivalve) TWWS 2302
- Turritella alcida (seal snail) TWWS 2302

=== Fish ===
- Carcharhinidae (requiem shark) SALR
- Myliobatidae (eagle ray) SALR
- Pristis (sawfish) SALR
- Sciaenidae (croaker) SALR

=== Reptiles ===
- Alligatoridae (alligator) SALR
- Boidae (boa or constricting snake) SALR
- Crocodylidae (crocodile) SALR
- Emydidae (pond turtle) SALR
- Testudinidae (land tortoise) SALR

=== Birds ===
- Gruidae (crane) SALR
- Ciconiidae (stork) SALR

=== Mammals ===
- Anchitherium clarencei (horse) SALR
- Aphelops (rhinoceros) SALR
- Archaeohippus blackbergi (horse) SALR
- Camelidae (family of camel) GPS
- Floridatragulus (camel) SALR
- Menoceras (rhinoceros) SALR
- Moropus SMRS
- Osbornodon iamonensis (proto-dog) GPS
- Oxydactylus (camel)
- Parahippus (horse) SALR
- Parahippus leonensis (horse) GPS, SALR
- Prosynthetoceras texanus (deer-like ungulate) SALR
- Nothokemas floridanus (camel) SALR
- Proheteromys floridanus (rodent) SALR
- Ruminantia (unknown ruminant) GPS
