= Florida Public Archaeology Network =

- Formation: 2004
- Headquarters: 207 East Main Street. Pensacola, FL
- Location: Florida
- Website: Florida Public Archaeology Network

The Florida Public Archaeology Network, or FPAN, is a state supported organization of regional centers dedicated to public outreach and assisting Florida municipalities and the Florida Division of Historical Resources "to promote the stewardship and protection of Florida's archaeological resources." FPAN was established in 2004, upon legislation that sought to establish a "Florida network of public archaeology centers to help stem the rapid deterioration of this state's buried past and to expand public interest in archaeology."

== Regions ==
The Florida Public Archaeology Network is divided into eight regions:

- Northwest Region – Counties of Escambia, Santa Rosa, Okaloosa, Walton, Holmes, Washington, Bay, Jackson, Calhoun, and Gulf.
- North Central Region – Counties of Gadsden, Liberty, Franklin, Leon, Wakulla, Jefferson, Madison, Taylor, Hamilton, Suwannee, Lafayette, Dixie, Columbia, Baker, and Union.
- Northeast Region – Counties of Nassau, Duval, Clay, St. Johns, Putnam, Flagler, and Volusia.
- Central Region – Counties of Gilchrist, Levy, Bradford, Alachua, Marion, Citrus, Hernando, Sumter, and Lake.
- East Central Region – Counties of Seminole, Orange, Osceola, Brevard, Indian River, Okeechobee, St. Lucie, and Martin.
- West Central Region – Counties of Pasco, Pinellas, Hillsborough, Polk, Manatee, Sarasota, Hardee, DeSoto, and Highlands.
- Southwest Region – Counties of Charlotte, Glades, Lee, Hendry, and Collier.
- Southeast Region – Counties of Palm Beach, Broward, Miami Dade, and Monroe.

== Projects ==
The Florida Panhandle Shipwreck Trail features 12 shipwrecks including artificial reefs and a variety of sea life for diving, snorkeling and fishing offshore of Pensacola, Destin, Panama City and Port St. Joe, Florida. The "trail offers an adventurous opportunity for heritage, recreational, and ecological tourism."

=== USS Oriskany ===
Pensacola: The largest artificial reef in the world, this wreck was named a Top 25 U.S. Dive Site in 2014 by Scuba Diving magazine. Depth: 80–212 feet Sink Date: May 17, 2006 Nicknamed the "Great Carrier Reef," the USS Oriskany, also known as the "Mighty O," was sunk after serving in the Pacific and earning battle stars for service in both the Korean and Vietnam Wars. Located 22 miles off the coast of Pensacola and submerged in more than 200 feet of water, this shipwreck offers exploration for divers of all skills and a myriad of pelagic and sedentary marine life.

=== YDT-14 ===
Pensacola: After years of training US Navy divers, this shipwreck is now a dive destination itself. Depth: 90 feet Sink Date: April 2000 Gulf storms have buried this diving tender to her decks, but the upper structure around 65 feet below sea level offers boundless exploration for divers.

=== San Pablo ===
Pensacola: This ship is steeped in a history of foreign spies, espionage and secret military operations. Depth: 80 feet Sink Date: August 11, 1944 Launched from Belfast, Ireland, in 1915, San Pablo started her life as a fruit transport running bananas from Central America to the United States. Early during World War II she was sunk by a U-boat in Costa Rica and refloated. In August 1944 amid rampant rumors of foreign spies and espionage, San Pablo exploded off Pensacola's coast, hence her local name "Russian Freighter." Recently declassified documents reveal that San Pablo was actually destroyed in a top-secret U.S. military operation testing an experimental weapon system. American agents sank the freighter with a radio-controlled boat carrying over 3,000 lbs. of explosives. Her wreckage is scattered across the seafloor where divers can explore boilers, refrigeration coils and huge sections of twisted metal, all home to an impressive array of marine life.

=== Pete Tide II ===
Pensacola: Three levels of decks offer boundless exploration in this upright underwater artificial reef. Depth: 100 feet Sink Date: 1993 An offshore oilfield supply vessel, this upright wreck boasts three levels of superstructure and an intact pilothouse making it home to mesmerizing schools of fish.

=== Three Coal Barges ===
Pensacola: Shallow wreckage is ideal for beginning divers to practice. Depth: 50 feet Sink Date: 1974 Sunk in an emergency operation to avoid the barges running ashore, these three barges lie end-to-end in less than 50 feet of water, creating a thriving habitat for marine life and a shallow destination for diving and snorkeling.

=== Miss Louise ===
Destin: Shallow waters make for an ideal dive training site. Depth: 60 feet Sink Date: 1997 A push tug, Miss Louise sits upright in 60 feet of water, brimming with marine life and serving as a great site for novice and intermediate divers.

=== Black Bart ===
Panama City: Appliances {including the ship's toilet} remain intact in the Head and Galley, offering unique exploration for divers. Depth: 85 feet Sink Date: 1993 Sunk in memory of Navy Supervisor of Salvage Captain Charles "Black Bart" Bartholomew, this oilfield supply vessel remains largely intact with its wheelhouse {40-foot depth}, deck {66-foot depth} and open cargo holds {80-foot depth}.

=== Fami Tugs ===
Panama City Beach: Nature rearranged this artificial reef, picking up one of the two tugs and situating it on top of the other for a most unusual diving experience. Depth: 100 feet Sink Date: 2003 Once resting bow-to-bow and joined by a 30-foot tether, a storm picked up one of the sunken tugs and placed it directly atop the other, allowing divers to enjoy two shipwrecks at once and serving as a reminder to visitors of the power of the sea.

=== USS Accokeek ===
Panama City Beach: More than 50 years of service around the world. Depth: 100 feet Sink Date: July 9, 2000 After a global run serving as a fleet tug, the USS Accokeek was repeatedly sunk and refloated for salvage and ordinance training at the Navy Dive School in Panama City, Fla.

=== USS Strength ===
Panama City Beach: This ship originally laid on her side at the ocean's floor before being righted by a hurricane in 1995. Depth: 80 feet Sink Date: May 19, 1987 A World War II minesweeper that survived a midget submarine attack and a kamikaze raid, the USS Strength offers divers a tour of a large artificial reef, including a large goliath grouper.

=== USS Chippewa ===
Panama City Beach: This tugboat is known for breaking speed records during her U.S. Navy tenure. Depth: 100 feet Sink Date: Feb. 8, 1990 Sunk as a Navy training platform for the Panama City Experimental Dive Unit in 1990, the USS Chippewa now sits upright on the bottom in 100 feet of water and offers good opportunities to observe marine life.

=== Vamar ===
Port St. Joe: Made famous as a support ship for Admiral Richard Byrd's 1928 Antarctic expedition, the Vamar sunk under mysterious circumstances. Depth: 25 feet Sink Date: March 21, 1942 Sunk under mysterious circumstances during a trip to carry lumber to Cuba in 1942, the Vamar now lies in just 25 feet of water, offering a large steam engine, bilge keels and a wide variety of marine life for divers and snorkelers.

=== Mardi Gras Shipwreck ===
In May 2007, an expedition, led by Texas A&M University and funded by the Okeanos Gas Gathering Company (OGGC), under an agreement with the Minerals Management Service (now BOEM), was launched to undertake the deepest scientific archaeological excavation ever attempted at that time to study a wreck site on the seafloor and recover artifacts for eventual public display in the Louisiana State Museum. The "Mardi Gras Shipwreck" sank some 200 years ago about 35 miles off the coast of Louisiana in the Gulf of Mexico in 4,000 feet (1,200 meters) of water. The shipwreck, whose real identity remains a mystery, lay forgotten at the bottom of the sea until it was discovered in 2002 by an oilfield inspection crew working for the OGGC. As part of the educational outreach Nautilus Productions in partnership with BOEM, Texas A&M University, the Florida Public Archaeology Network and Veolia Environmental produced a one-hour HD documentary about the project, short videos for public viewing and provided video updates during the expedition. The Center for Maritime Archaeology and Conservation was tasked with the conservation and analysis of the material recovered from the wreck site.
