= Torreya Formation =

- Stratigraphic range: Miocene
- Type: Geological formation
- Unit of: Hawthorn Group
- Sub-units: Dogtown, Sopchoppy
- Underlies: St. Marks Formation, Suwanee Limestone

Location
- Region: North Florida
- Country: United States

Type section
- Named for: Torreya tree

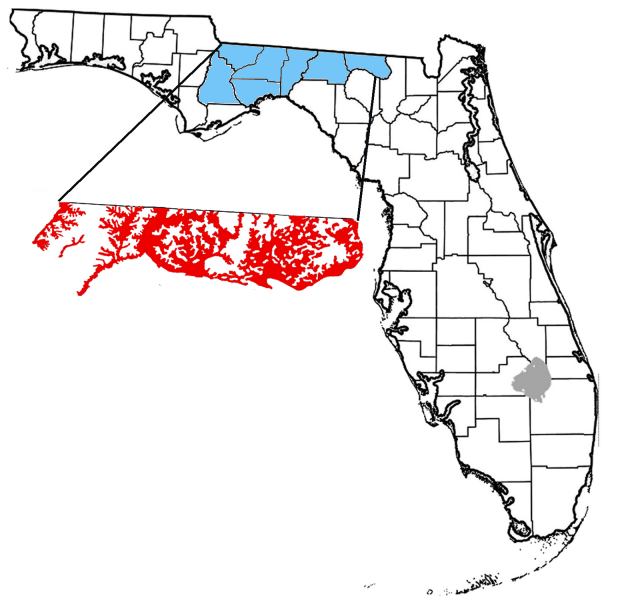
Location of the Torreya Formation in Florida in red.

The Torreya Formation is a Miocene geologic formation with an outcrop in North Florida. It is within the Hawthorn Group.

== Age ==
Period: Neogene
Epoch: Early Miocene
Faunal stage: Aquitanian through early Messinian ~19–15.3 mya, calculates to a period of 3.7 million years

== Composition ==
The Torreya Formation is exposed or near the surface from Gadsden County, Florida on the west. Its eastern extent is westernmost Hamilton County, Florida. It includes the counties of Liberty, Leon, Jefferson, Madison, and Wakulla. It is informally subdivided into a lower carbonate unit and an upper siliciclastic unit. The majority of Torreya Formation outcrops expose the siliciclastic part of the unit.

== Lithology ==
The siliciclastics are quartz and vary in color from white to light olive gray. They are unconsolidated to poorly indurated (hard), slightly clayey sands with minor phosphate to light gray to bluish gray, poorly consolidated, variably silty clay (Dogtown Member). The siliciclastics are sporadically fossiliferous and often contain oyster shells as found in the Seaboard Air Line Railroad site.

The carbonate sediments contain phosphate and are white to light olive gray. They are generally not hard but variably sandy with clay. This unit is also fossiliferous with both molds and casts and includes limestone (mudstone and wackestone). The limestones often grade into calcareous-cemented sands.

The Dogtown Member is time transgressive with older aged material at ~15.9–15.3 Ma. and found in the south while the younger material is in the north.

== Overlay ==
The Torreya Formation overlies the Floridan aquifer and forms part of the intermediate confining unit/aquifer system. (USGS)

== Paleofauna ==
Barstovian land-mammal fauna found in northern Gadsden County dated 14.7–16.6 Ma. Paleofauna based on the fossils from: Gadsden County paleontological sites, Leon County paleontological sites, Jefferson County paleontological sites, and Hamilton County paleontological sites.

Bivalve

- Ostrea normalis

Fish

- Myliobatis (Rays)
- Carcharhinidae (Sharks)
- Pristis (Sawfish)
- Pogonias cromis

Reptiles

- Alligatoridae (Alligator)
- Boidae (Boa)
- Ciconiidae (Turtle)
- †Crocodylidae (Crocodile)
- Geochelone (Turtle)
- Pseudemys (Turtle)

Birds

- Gruidae (Crane)

Mammals

- †Aletomeryx and A. gracilis
- †Amphicyon and A. pontoni (dog-like carnivore)
- †Anchitherium and A. clarencei (Horse)
- †Archaeohippus and A. blackbergi (Horse)
- †Borophaginae (Bone-crushing dog)
- †Camelidae (Camel)
- †Canidae (Canine unknown)
- †Equidae (Horse)
- †Floridatragulus (Camel)
- †Harrymys magnus (Mouse)
- †Merychippus and M. gunteri (Horse)
- †Nanosiren (Sea Cow)
- †Nothokemas and N. floridanus (Camel)
- †Osbornodon iamonensis (Proto-dog)
- †Parahippus leonensis (Horse)
- †Proheteromys and P. floridanus (Rodent)
- †Prosynthetoceras and P. texanus (Deer-like ungulate)
- †Procyoninae (Mustelid)
- †Merycoidodontidae (Hog)
- †Mesogaulus (Horned gopher)
- †Rhinocerotidae (Rhinoceros)
- †Ruminantia (Ruminant basal)
- †Squalodon (shark toothed dolphin)
