= Gadsden County, Florida paleontological sites =

Discovery sites of Early Miocene fossils

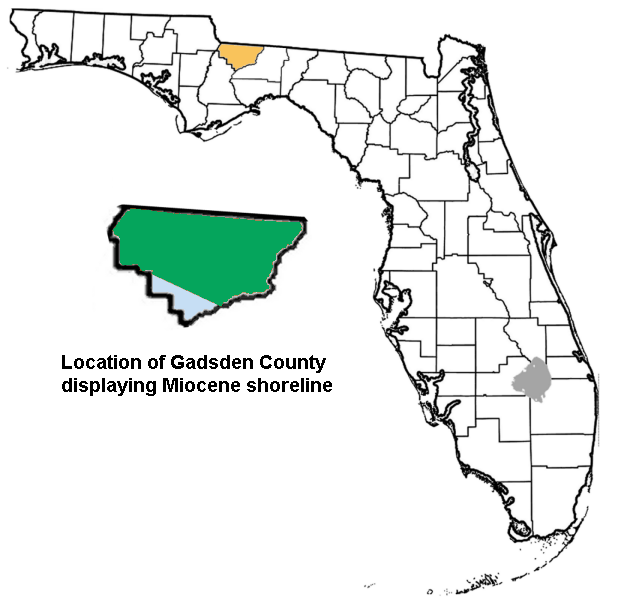
Gadsden County, Florida displaying Miocene shoreline according to the Florida Geologic Survey.

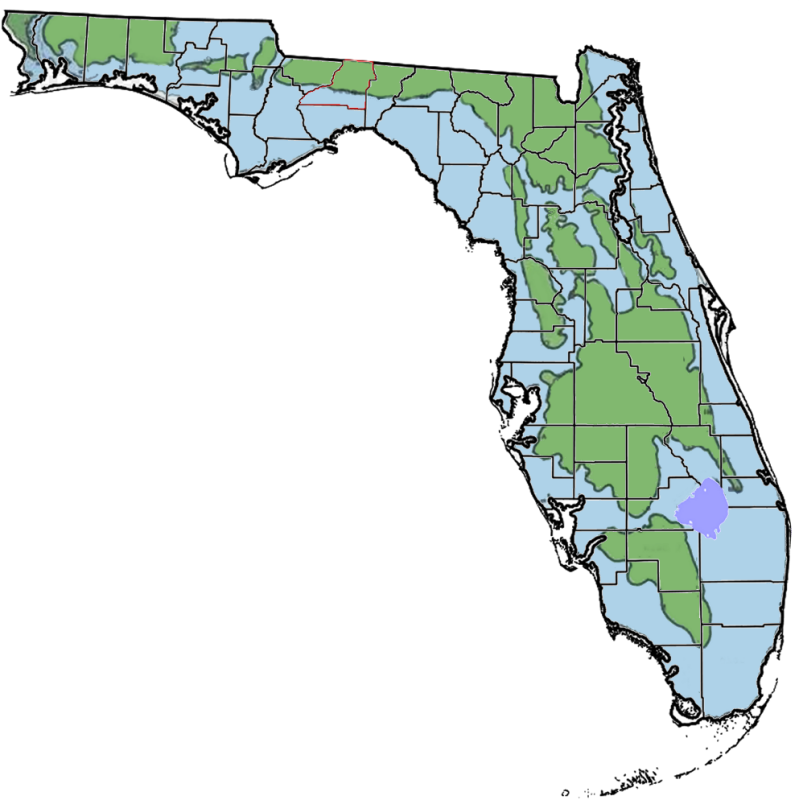
Florida during the Miocene

The Gadsden County paleontological sites are assemblages of Early Miocene invertebrates and vertebrates occurring in Gadsden County, Florida, United States.

== Age ==
Era: Neogene
Period: Early Miocene
Faunal stage: Hemingfordian ~20.6—16.3 Mya, calculates to a period of approximately 4.3 million years
Geologic formation: Torreya Formation

== Sites ==
Gadsden County paleontological sites are represented by the following:
La Camelia Site. Time period: 17.7 Mya. (AEO)
Midway Site. Time period: ~18.9—18.8 Mya.
Milwhite Gunn Farm Site. Time period: ~17.0 Mya. (AEO)
Quincy Site. Time period: ~17.0 Mya. (AEO)
Coordinates: 30.5°N 84.5°W

== Genus and species identified ==
La Camelia site = LCS. Midway site. = MIS. Milwhite Gunn Farfm Site. Marks River site = MGFD. Quincy site = QUI.

== Reptiles and amphibians ==
- Batrachosauroides B. dissimulans (amphibian) MGFD
- Colubrinae (snake) MGFD
- Natricinae (snake) MGFD
- Scincidae (skink) MGFD
- Cnemidophorus (racerunner lizard).MGFD.
- Heloderma (Gila monster type poisonous lizard) LCS
- Leiocephalus (lizard) MGFD

== Mammals ==
=== Carnivores ===
- Amphicyon pontoni (bear-dog) MIS
- Borophaginae (proto-dog) MIS
- Procyon (raccoon) MIS

=== Herbivores ===
- Acritohippus isonesus (horse) LCS
- Anchitherium clarencei MIS
- Aphelops (rhinoceros) LCS, MIS, MGFD
- Archaeohippus blackbergi
- Blastomeryx (musk deer) MIS
- Bouromeryx americanus (deer-like) LCS
- Harrymys magnus (kangaroo rat) MIS
- Lantanotherium (gymnure) MGFD
- Copemys (hamster-like rodents) MGFD
- Metaxytherium crataegense (sea cow) LCS, MGFD
- Merychippus gunteri (horse) LCS, MGFD, QUI
- Merychippus primus (horse) LCS, MGFD
- Mylagaulus (horned rodent) MIS, MGFD
- Nanosiren (sea cow) MIS
- Merycoidodontidae (oreodont) MIS
- Perognathus minutus (mouse) MGFD
- Proheteromys floridanus (kangaroo rat) MIS, MGFD
- Prosynthetoceras texanus (deer-like) MIS
- Prosthennops xiphodonticus (deer-like). LCS
- Rakomeryx (deer-like) LCS
