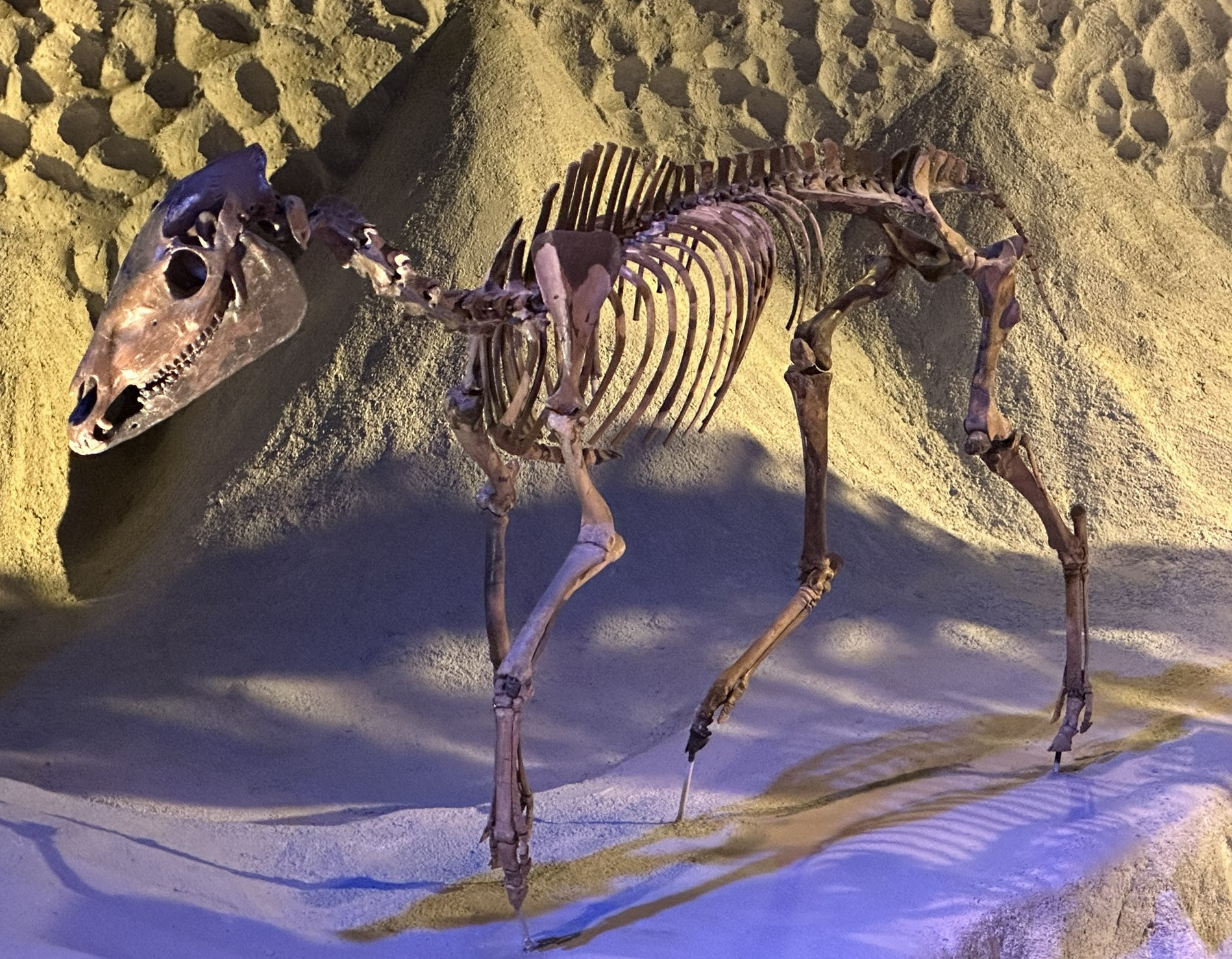
- Reconstructed P. leonensis skeleton, Florida Museum of Natural History

Scientific classification
- Kingdom: Animalia
- Phylum: Chordata
- Class: Mammalia
- Infraclass: Placentalia
- Order: Perissodactyla
- Family: Equidae
- Subfamily: †Anchitheriinae
- Genus: †Parahippus; Leidy, 1858

Species
- P. cognatus Leidy, 1858; P. coloradoensis Gidley, 1907; P. leonensis Sellards, 1916; P. pawniensis Gidley, 1907

= Parahippus =

Parahippus Temporal range: Miocene, 24–17 Ma

Extinct genus of mammals

Parahippus ("near to horse"), is an extinct equid, a relative of modern horses, asses, and zebras. It lived from 24 to 17 million years ago, during the Miocene epoch. It was very similar to Miohippus, but slightly larger, at around 1 metre (10 hands) tall, at the withers. Their fossils have been found in North America, primarily in the Great Plains region and Florida.

== Taxonomy ==
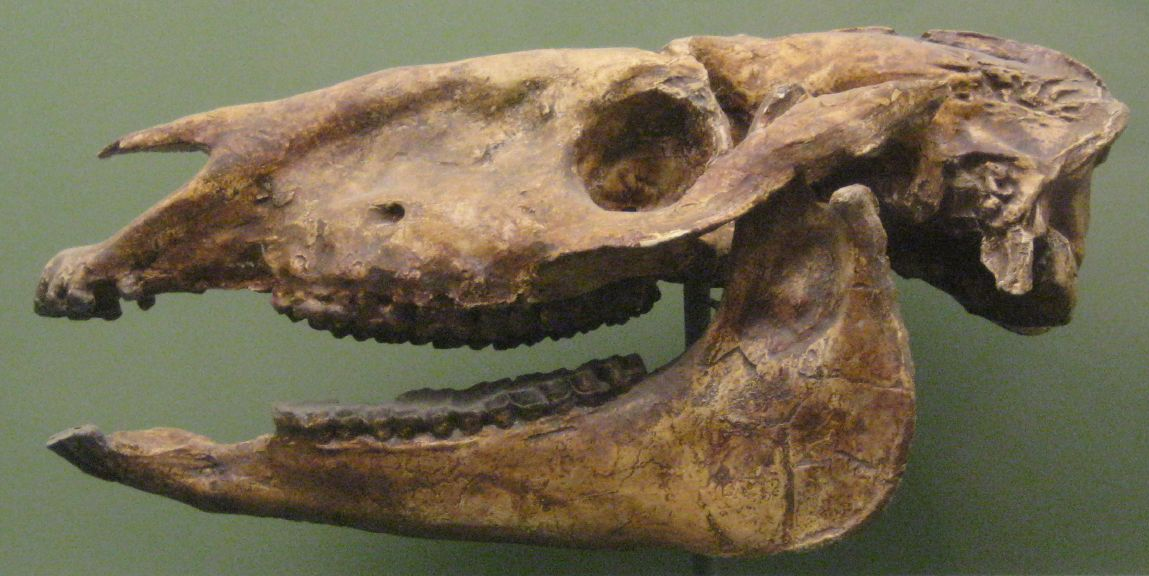
Skull of P. cognatus, National Museum of Natural History

The following fossil species are known:

- P. cognatus Leidy, 1858 (type species) - mid-Miocene (Hemingfordian to Barstovian) of Nebraska (Loup Fork Formation) & South Dakota (Batesland Formation), US
- P. coloradoensis Gidley, 1907 - early-mid Miocene (Arikareean to Barstovian) of South Dakota (Rosebud Formation), Colorado (Pawnee Creek Formation), & Oregon (Butte Creek Formation)
- P. leonensis Sellards, 1916 - early to mid-Miocene (Arikareean to Hemingfordian) of Florida (Torreya Formation), Delaware (Calvert Formation), Texas (Oakville Formation), Colorado (Browns Park Formation), & Oregon (John Day Formation)
- P. pawniensis Gidley, 1907 - early-mid Miocene (Arikareean to Hemingfordian) of Colorado (Pawnee Creek Formation), Wyoming, South Dakota (Rosebud Formation), Nevada, California (Vaqueros Formation) & Oregon (John Day Formation)

The former species P. tyleri Loomis, 1908 is now placed in Desmatippus.

== Description ==
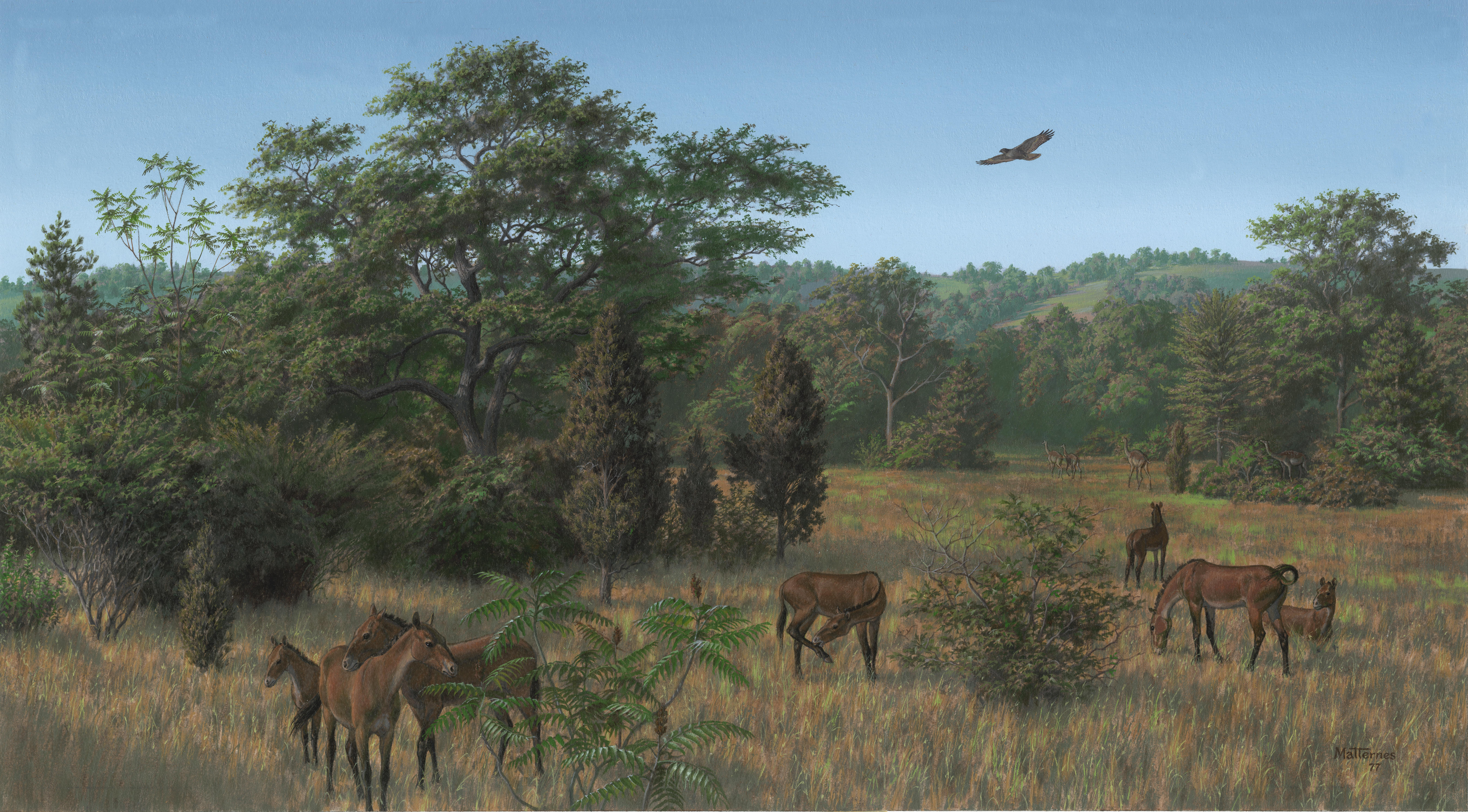
Parahippus herd in the Agate Fossil Beds

Parahippus was larger than Miohippus, with longer legs and face. The bones in the legs were fused and this, along with muscle development, allowed Parahippus to move with forward-and-back strides. Flexible leg rotation was eliminated, so that the animal was better adapted to fast forward running on open ground without moving from side to side. Most importantly, Parahippus was able to stand on its middle toe, instead of walking on pads, which gave it the ability to run faster; its weight was supported by ligaments under the fetlock to the big central toe.

Since leafy food had become scarce, these animals were forced to subsist on the newly evolved grasses that were by now taking over the plains, and their teeth adapted accordingly. The extra molar crest that was variable in Miohippus became permanent in Parahippus. The molars developed high crowns and a hard covering for grinding the grass, which was typically covered with high-silica dust and sand.

== See also ==
- Evolution of the horse
