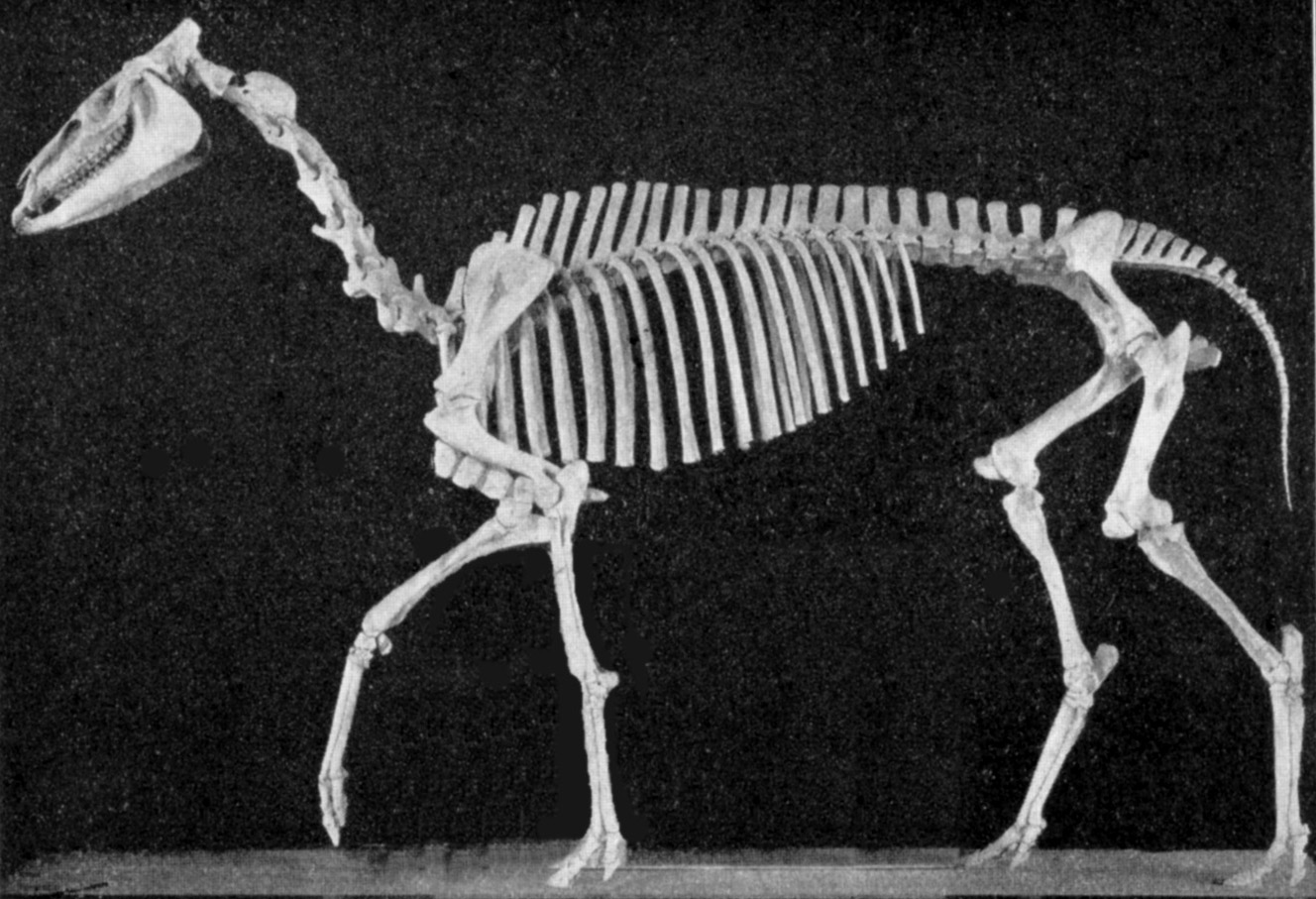
- Hypohippus

Scientific classification
- Kingdom: Animalia
- Phylum: Chordata
- Class: Mammalia
- Order: Perissodactyla
- Family: Equidae
- Subfamily: †Anchitheriinae; Leidy, 1869

Genera
- †Archaeohippus; †Desmatippus; †Mesohippus; †Miohippus; †Parahippus; Anchitheriini; †Anchitherium; †Megahippus; †Sinohippus; †Kalobatippus; †Hypohippus

= Anchitheriinae =

Anchitheriinae Temporal range: 40–9 Ma Late Eocene to late Miocene

Extinct subfamily of mammals

Anchitheriinae is an extinct subfamily of the horse family Equidae. The group is suggested to be paraphyletic as a whole, representing various early offshoots of the lineage leading to Equinae (which contains modern zebras, horses and asses), though the tribe Anchitheriini (Anchitheriinae sensu stricto,” or “anchitherines”) represents a monophyletic group. The group first appeared in North America during the late Eocene, around 40 million years ago, subsequently radiating and reaching a peak of diversity by the end of the Eocene, around 34 million years ago, underdoing a slight decline during the Oligocene, with members of Anchitheriini dispersing across the Bering Land Bridge to Eurasia during the Early Miocene, around 19 million years ago, subsequently dispersing as far westward as Western Europe, though they never appear to have reached Africa. Anchitheres reached a maximum diversity of 15 concurrent species in the mid Miocene, around 15.5 million years ago, however following apex this they underwent continual decline, with Anchitheriini becoming extinct around the late Miocene, approximately 10 million years ago in North America and 9 million years ago in Eurasia, which followed the arrival of hipparionine equines into the Old World from North America.

Members of the subfamily are typically considered browsers on leaves, with their more ancestral low-crowned (brachydont) molars, in contrast with the modern, specialized grazer species of modern Equinae, which have high crowned (hypsodont) molars, however there is evidence that "anchitheres" that lie closer to Equinae than to Anchitheriini incorporated considerable amounts of grass in their diet. While early "anchitheres" less closely related to Anchitheriini than Anchitheriini is to Equinae, had small body masses of only 25–60 kilograms (55–132 lb), members of the tribe Anchitheriini were large, with body masses ranging from 75–160 kilograms (165–353 lb) in Kalobatippus to 230–600 kilograms (510–1,320 lb) in Hypohippus. Members of Anchitheriini had relatively long necks and metapodial bones of the foot compared to modern equines. Anchitheriins had three toed feet with a prominent central toe, with their feet probably having something similar to the foot pad of tapirs rather than the hooves of modern equines. The skulls of Anchitheriins were less deep than modern equines, and their eye sockets were not completely closed, unlike those of modern equines.

Cladogram of Equidae, including paraphyletic Anchitheriinae, after Cantalapiedra et al. 2023:

- Equidae
  - "Basal horses" (e.g. Arenahippus, Pliolophus and Eohippus)
  - - Mesohippus
    - - Miohippus
      - - Anchitheriini
        - - Archaeohippus
          - - Desmatippus
            - - Parahippus
              - Equinae

Cladogram of Anchitheriini, after Janis et al. 2023:

- Anchitheriini
  - - Anchitherium
    - Sinohippus
  - Kalobatippus
  - - Hypohippus
    - Megahippus
