= Suwannee County, Florida paleontological sites =

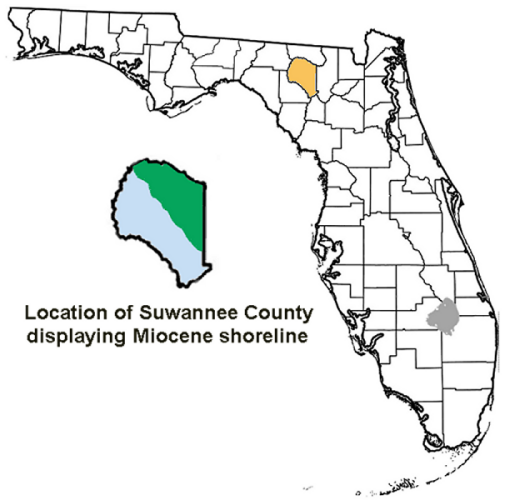
Suwannee County.

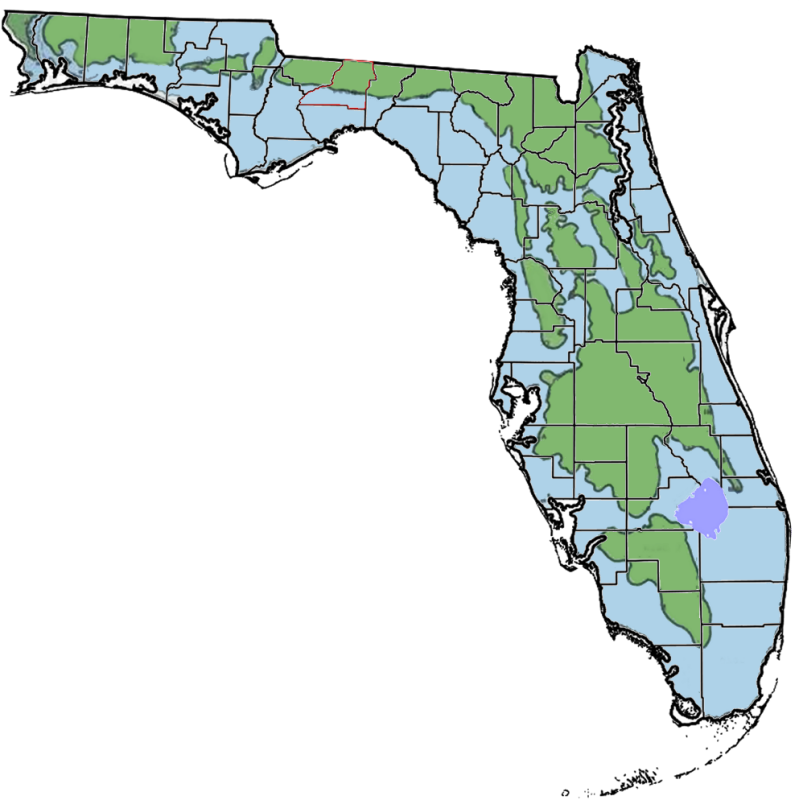
Florida during the Miocene

The Suwannee County, Florida paleontological sites are assemblages of Early Miocene invertebrates and vertebrates occurring in Suwannee County, Florida.

== Age ==
Era: Neogene
Period: Early Miocene
Faunal stage: Arikareean (30.8—20.6 Ma.), calculates to a period of approximately 1.2 million years.

== Sites ==
S1BA site a.k.a. Live Oak site. AEO: ~21.8—21.7 Mya., approximately 0.1 million years
Coordinates: 30.3°N 83.0°W

== Specimens ==
=== Mammals ===
- Anchitheriinae (horse)
- Arikarictis chapini (mustelid)
- Daphoenodon (bear-dog)
- Leptocyon (canine)
- Eomyidae (gopher)
- Geomyoidea (pocket gopher)
- Herpetotherium (pygmy opossum)
- Harrymys magnus
- Mammacyon obtusidens (bear-dog)
- Megalictis frazieri (mustelid)
- Nothokemas waldropi (camel)
- Palaeogale minuta (catlike carnivore)
- Phlaocyon leucosteus
- Protosciurus (tree squirrel)
- Vespertilionidae (bat)
