= Center for Maritime Archaeology and Conservation =

Academic centre at Texas A&M University

The Center for Maritime Archaeology and Conservation (CMAC) was created in May 2005 by the regents of Texas A&M University.

CMAC supports the Nautical Archaeology Program (NAP) in the Department of Anthropology and strengthens the position of the NAP as the leading program in nautical and maritime archaeology. CMAC encompasses eight laboratories which foster interdisciplinary research, education, and outreach programs.

CMAC provides direction and coordination to scholars worldwide in projects related to nautical archaeology, maritime archaeology, underwater archaeology, or conservation of material recovered from marine or other aqueous environments. CMAC plays a leading role in disseminating the results of nautical archaeology research to both scientists and the general public through the Studies in Nautical Archaeology Series published by Texas A&M University Press, as well as through journal publications and internet presence.

== Projects ==
La Belle was one of Robert de La Salle's four ships when he explored the Gulf of Mexico with the ill-fated mission of starting a French colony at the mouth of the Mississippi River in 1685. La Belle was wrecked in present-day Matagorda Bay the following year, dooming La Salle's Texas colony to failure. For over three centuries the wreckage of La Belle lay forgotten until it was discovered by a team of state archaeologists in 1995. The discovery of La Salle's flagship in July 1995 was regarded as one of the most important archaeological finds of the century, and a major excavation was launched by the state of Texas that, over a period of about a year, recovered the entire shipwreck and over a million artifacts. All of the artifacts were removed from the hull by the start of March 1997. From that point on, the archaeologists concentrated on the remains of the ship itself. The entire ship was disassembled, each timber being carefully recorded before and after its removal from the hull remains. Fieldwork was completed by May 1997. The recovered timbers were eventually reassembled in a special cradle and vat designed at Texas A&M University's Nautical Archaeology Program, the institution in charge of the conservation of all the artifacts recovered from the shipwreck site after 1995. The hull of the ship and many of the recovered artifacts, including a cannon, are now on display at the Bob Bullock Texas State History Museum in the state capital of Austin.

The "Mardi Gras Shipwreck" sank some 200 years ago about 35 miles off the coast of Louisiana in the Gulf of Mexico in 4,000 feet (1,200 meters) of water. The shipwreck, whose real identity remains a mystery, lay forgotten at the bottom of the sea until it was discovered in 2002 by an oilfield inspection crew working for the Okeanos Gas Gathering Company (OGGC). In May 2007, an expedition, led by Texas A&M University and funded by OGGC under an agreement with the Minerals Management Service (now BOEM), was launched to undertake the deepest scientific archaeological excavation ever attempted at that time to study the site on the seafloor and recover artifacts for eventual public display in the Louisiana State Museum. As part of the educational outreach Nautilus Productions in partnership with BOEM, Texas A&M University, the Florida Public Archaeology Network and Veolia Environmental produced a one-hour HD documentary about the project, short videos for public viewing and provided video updates during the expedition. CMAC was tasked with the conservation and analysis of the material recovered from the wreck site.
