= Nautical Archaeology Program =

Graduate degree program at Texas A&M University

The Nautical Archaeology Program (NAP) is a degree-granting program within the Anthropology Department at Texas A&M University in College Station, Texas.

The Nautical Archaeology Program offers admission to students seeking graduate degrees in nautical archaeology. The primary focus is on training archaeologists to become divers, rather than teaching divers the principles of anthropology and archaeology. Students are also required to learn the principles of archaeological conservation, with primary emphasis on the treatment of waterlogged artifacts.

== Academic Program ==
The program has six full-time faculty members and many research associates who conduct surveys, excavations, conservation and reconstruction of ancient, medieval, and early modern shipwrecks. Each professor holds an endowed fellowship. All NAP students are required to take several core courses: History of Wooden Shipbuilding, Research and Reconstruction of Ships, Conservation of Cultural Resources, and Archaeological Methods and Theory. The average time to complete a master's degree is three to five years; for a Ph.D. the average is five to seven years. The program admits between eight and ten students each year. Graduating students are awarded their M.A. or Ph.D. in Anthropology.

== History of the Program ==
The Nautical Archaeology Program began after the Institute of Nautical Archaeology (INA) became affiliated with Texas A&M University in 1976. As part of the affiliation, Texas A&M established the Nautical Archaeology Program as a separate entity. Since the first excavations INA carried out were in the Mediterranean, the main focus was initially on Old World nautical archaeology; after affiliating with the University, a New World archaeologist joined the staff, and work began in North America and Africa. The establishment of a department dedicated to the discipline allowed nautical archaeology to develop into an important subfield of archaeology.

In 2005, the Texas A&M University System Board of Regents established the Center for Maritime Archaeology and Conservation (CMAC), a research center intended to be the main mechanism of cooperation between the Nautical Archaeology Program and the Institute of Nautical Archaeology. All of the laboratories once part of the Nautical Archaeology Program are now administered by CMAC. CMAC is meant to be the Nautical counterpart of the Center for the Study of the First Americans (CSFA), a highly regarded research institute affiliated with Texas A&M which works closely with the terrestrial archaeologists in the Anthropology department.

=== Faculty ===
The staff of six full-time professors of Nautical Archaeology makes the NAP one of the largest academic programs in nautical archaeology in the world. NAP professors direct most of INA's projects, since the security offered by their permanent positions allows a long-term commitment to excavation and publishing. Each professor holds an endowed fellowship, professorship, or chair
