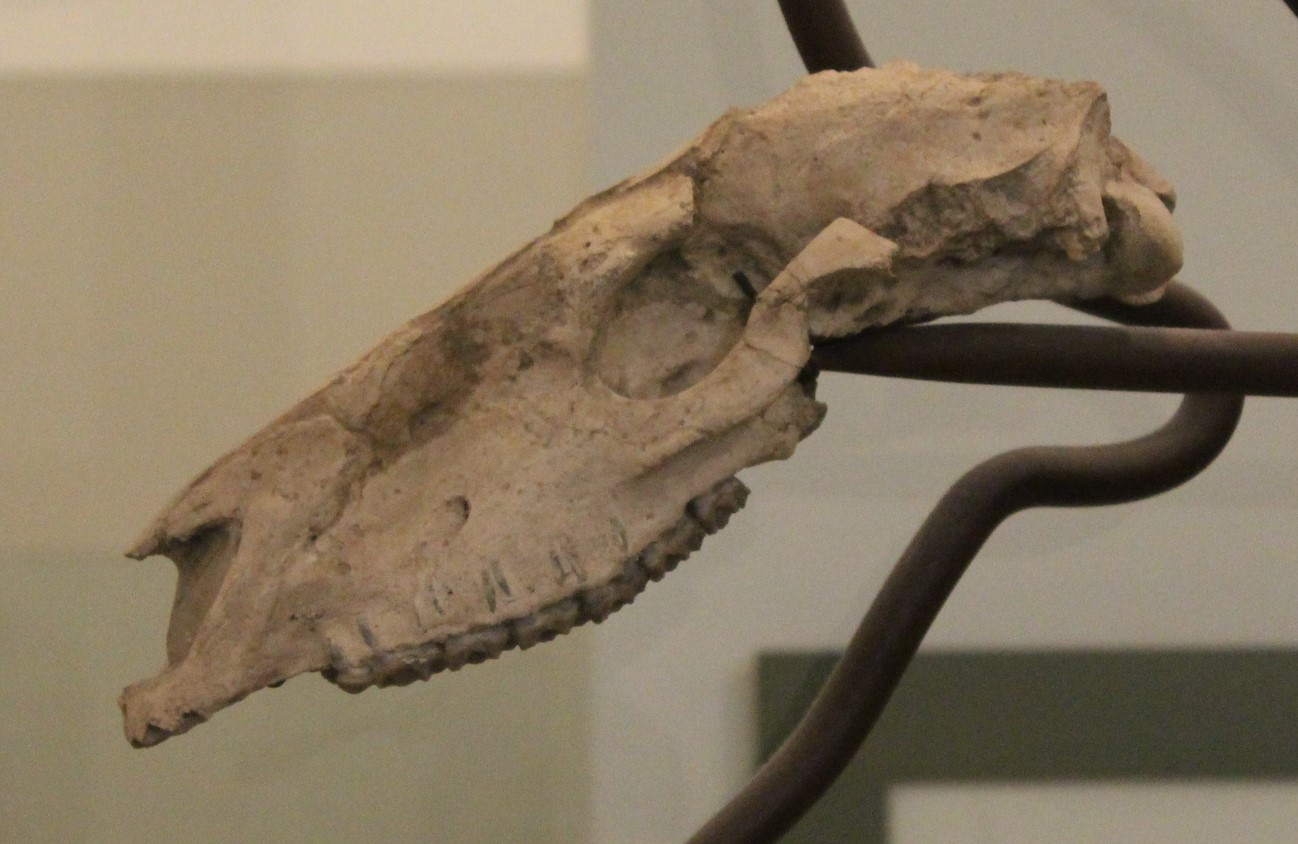
- K. agatensis skull, American Museum of Natural History

Scientific classification
- Kingdom: Animalia
- Phylum: Chordata
- Class: Mammalia
- Order: Perissodactyla
- Family: Equidae
- Subfamily: †Anchitheriinae
- Genus: †Kalobatippus; Osborn, 1915

= Kalobatippus =

Extinct genus of mammals

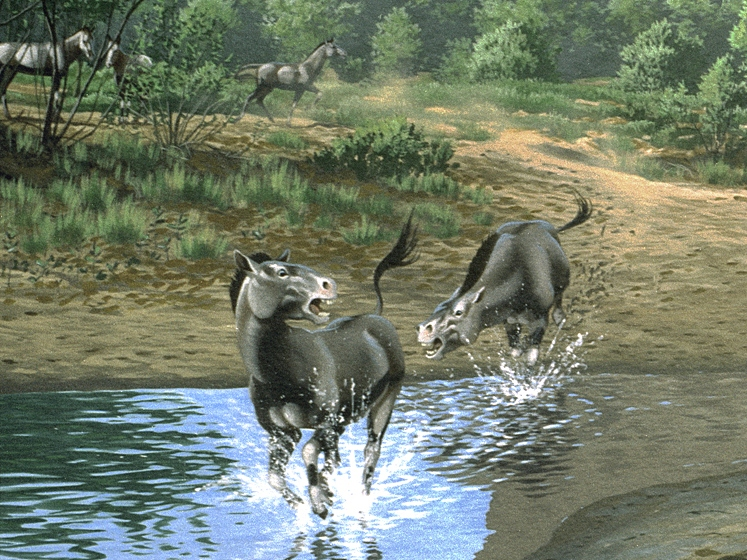
Life restoration

Kalobatippus ('stilt walking horse') is a genus of anchitheriinae equid. It gets its name from the elongated bones between the ankle/wrist and the toes. Kalobatippus ate leaves and was characterized by unusually long legs. It lived 24 to 19 million years ago. Estimated body mass for Kalobatippus is 131.7 kg (290 lb).
