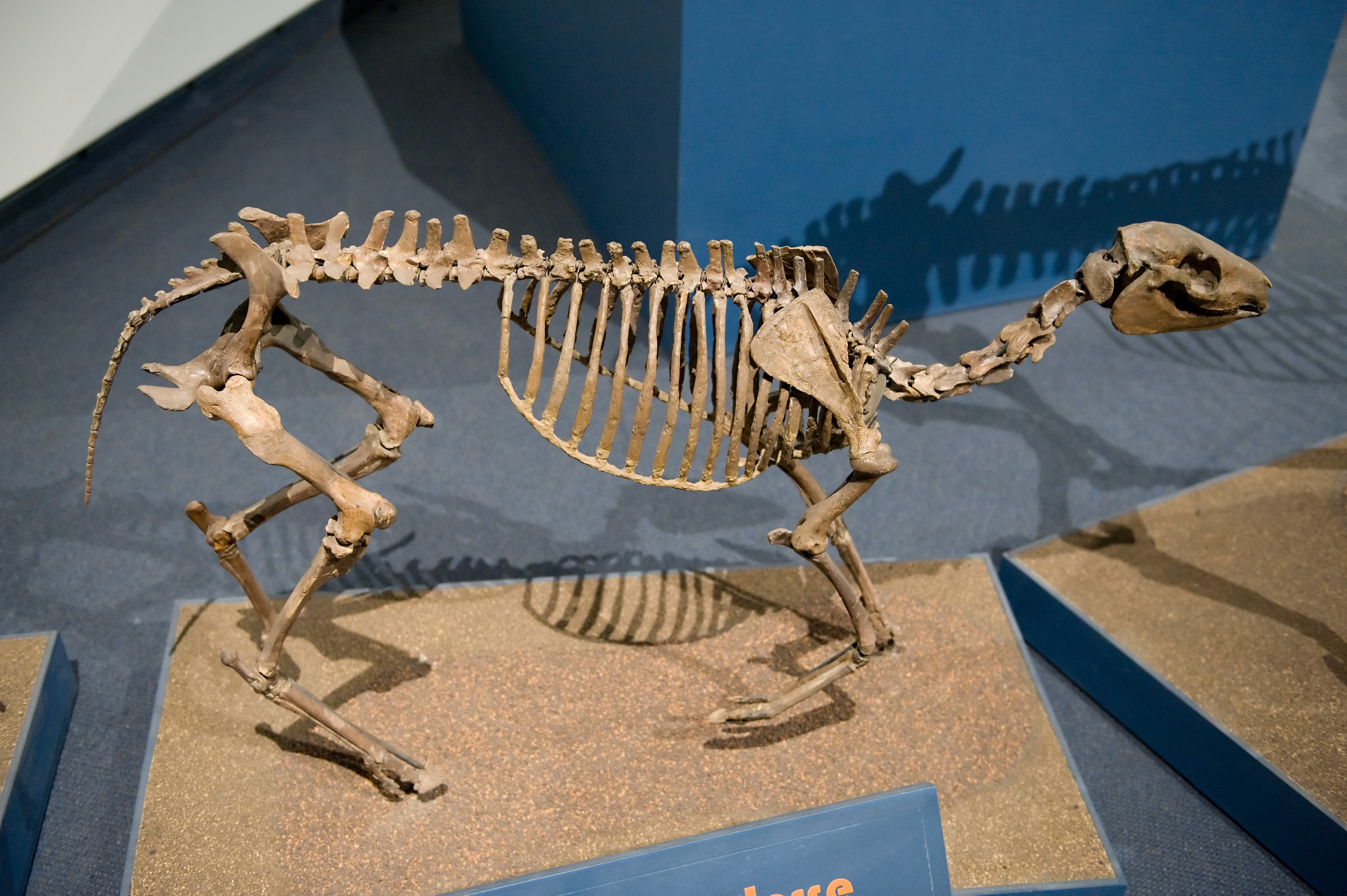
- Skeleton

Scientific classification
- Kingdom: Animalia
- Phylum: Chordata
- Class: Mammalia
- Order: Perissodactyla
- Family: Equidae
- Subfamily: †Anchitheriinae
- Genus: †Miohippus; Marsh, 1874

Species
- See text

= Miohippus =

Miohippus Temporal range: late Eocene to late Oligocene

Extinct genus of mammals

Miohippus (meaning "small horse") is an extinct genus of horse existing longer than most Equidae. It lived in what is now North America from 32 to 25 million years ago, during the late Eocene to late Oligocene. According to the Florida Museum of Natural History, Othniel Charles Marsh first believed Miohippus lived during the Miocene and thus named the genus using this incorrect conclusion. More recent research provides evidence that Miohippus actually lived during the Paleogene period.

Miohippus species are commonly referred to as the three-toed horses. Their range was from Alberta, Canada to Florida to California.

== Taxonomy ==
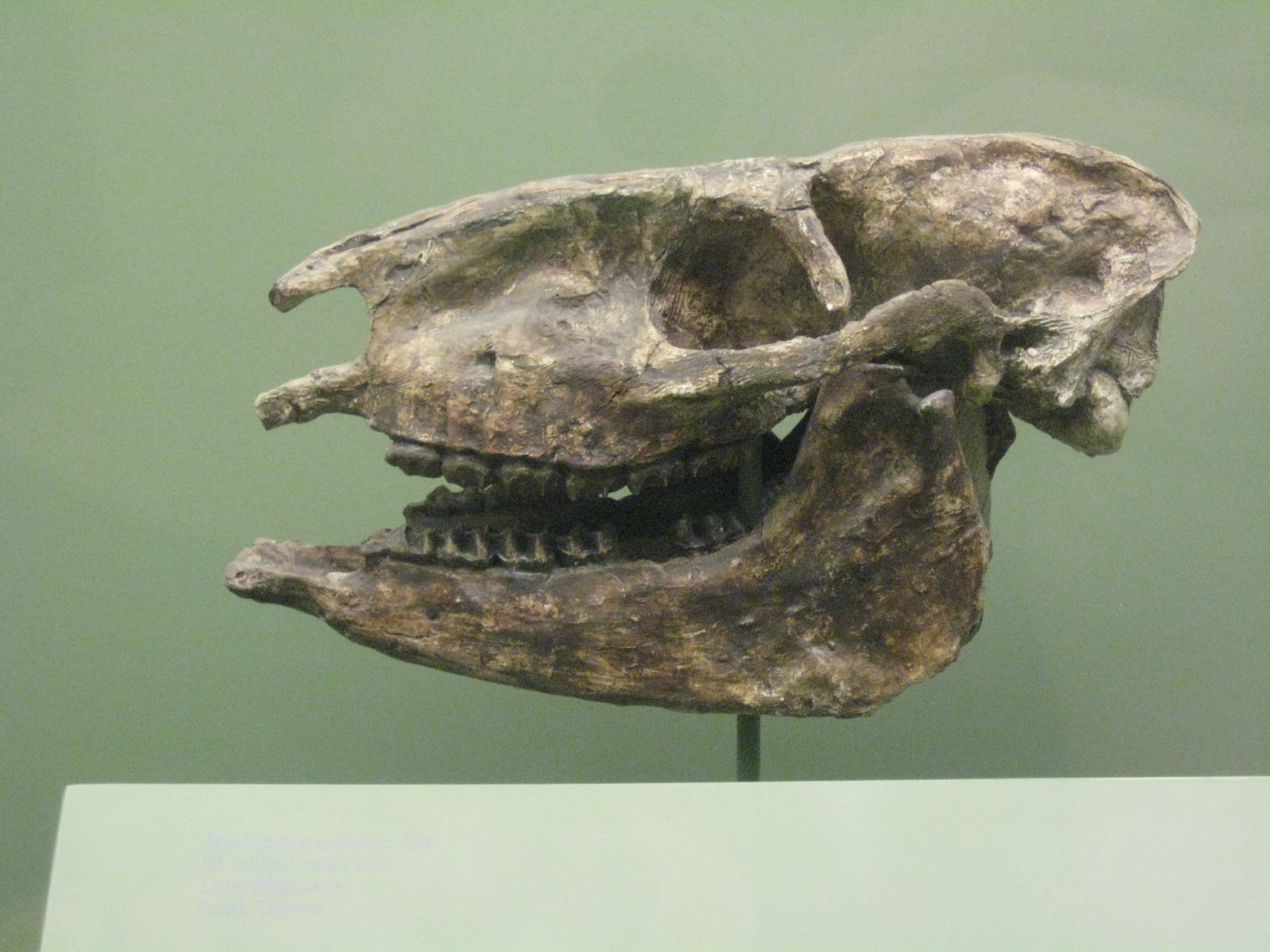
Skull

The type species of Miohippus, M. annectens, was named by Marsh in 1874. It is classified as a member of the subfamily Anchitheriinae following MacFadden (1998).

=== Species list ===
- M. anceps Marsh, 1874
- M. annectens Marsh, 1874 Type species
- M. assiniboiensis Lambe, 1905
- M. condoni Leidy, 1870
- M. equiceps Cope, 1879
- M. equinanus Osborn, 1918
- M. gemmarosae Osborn, 1918
- M. gidleyi Osborn, 1904
- M. intermedius Osborn & Wortman, 1895
- M. longicristis Cope, 1878
- M. obliquidens Osborn, 1904
- M. primus Osborn, 1918
- M. quartus Osborn, 1918

== Description ==
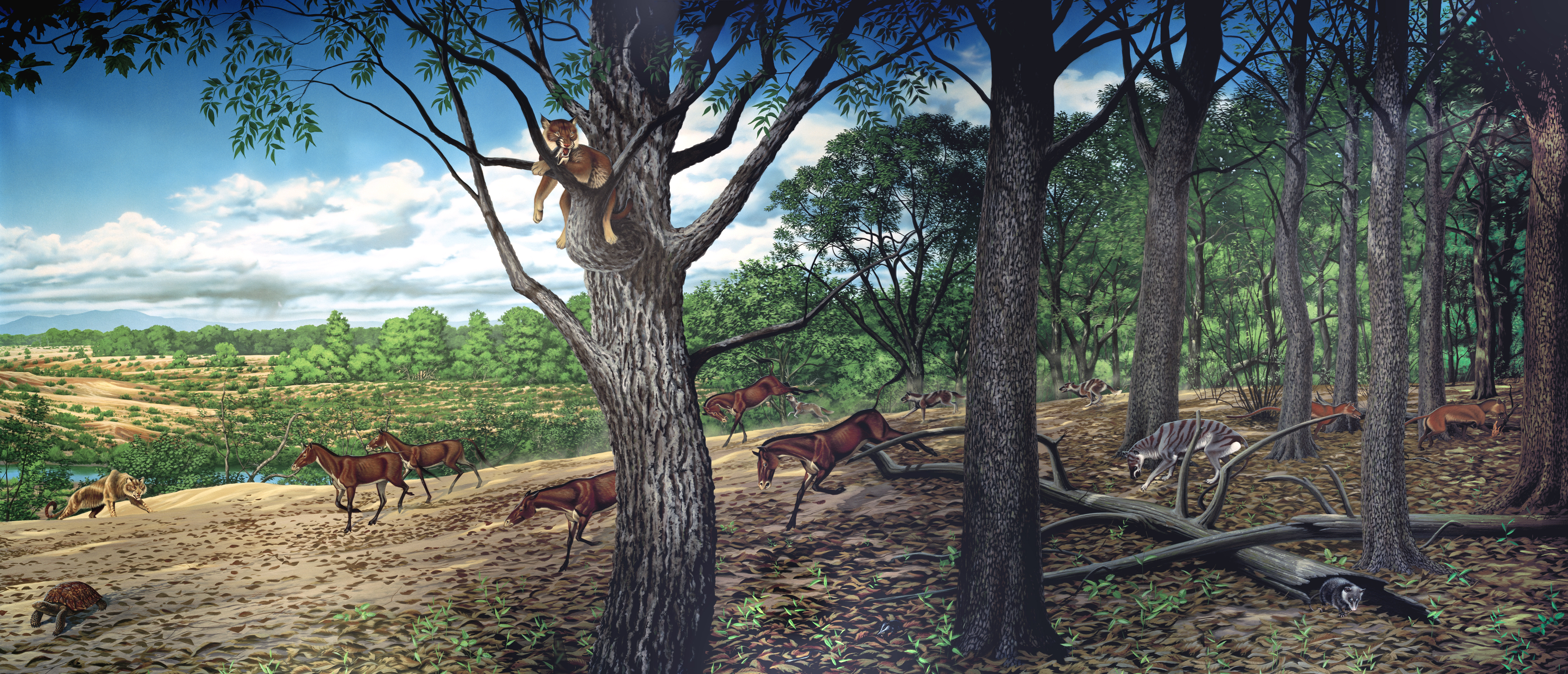
Restoration of Miohippus (middle) and other animals from the Turtle Cove Member of the John Day Formation. Image courtesy of the National Park Service

The species M. obliquidens dating from 34.9 to 30.0 Ma found in Montana, North Dakota, South Dakota, and Nebraska when calculated for estimated body mass were within the margin of 25 to 30 kg (55 to 66 lbs). Miohippus became much larger than Mesohippus. They weighed around 40 to 55 kilograms. They were somewhat larger than most earlier Eocene horse ancestors, but still much smaller than modern horses, which typically weigh about 500 kilograms.

Miohippus was larger than Mesohippus and had a slightly longer skull. Its facial fossa was deeper and more expanded, and the ankle joint was subtly different. Miohippus also had a variable extra crest on its upper molars, which gave it a larger surface area for chewing tougher forage. This would become a typical characteristic of the teeth of later equine species.

Miohippus had two forms, one of which adjusted to the life in forests, while the other remained suited to life on prairies. The forest form led to the birth of Kalobatippus (or Miohippus intermedius), whose second and fourth finger again elongated for travel on the softer primeval forest grounds. The Kalobatippus managed to relocate to Asia via the Bering Strait land bridge, and from there moved into Europe, where its fossils were formerly described under the name Anchitherium. Kalobatippus is then believed to have evolved into a form known as Hypohippus, which became extinct near the beginning of the Pliocene.

As many as eight species of Miohippus were described from the John Day Formation of Oregon, but recent work on the dental variation has determined that only one species of Miohippus was present within a given member.

== See also ==
- Evolution of the horse
