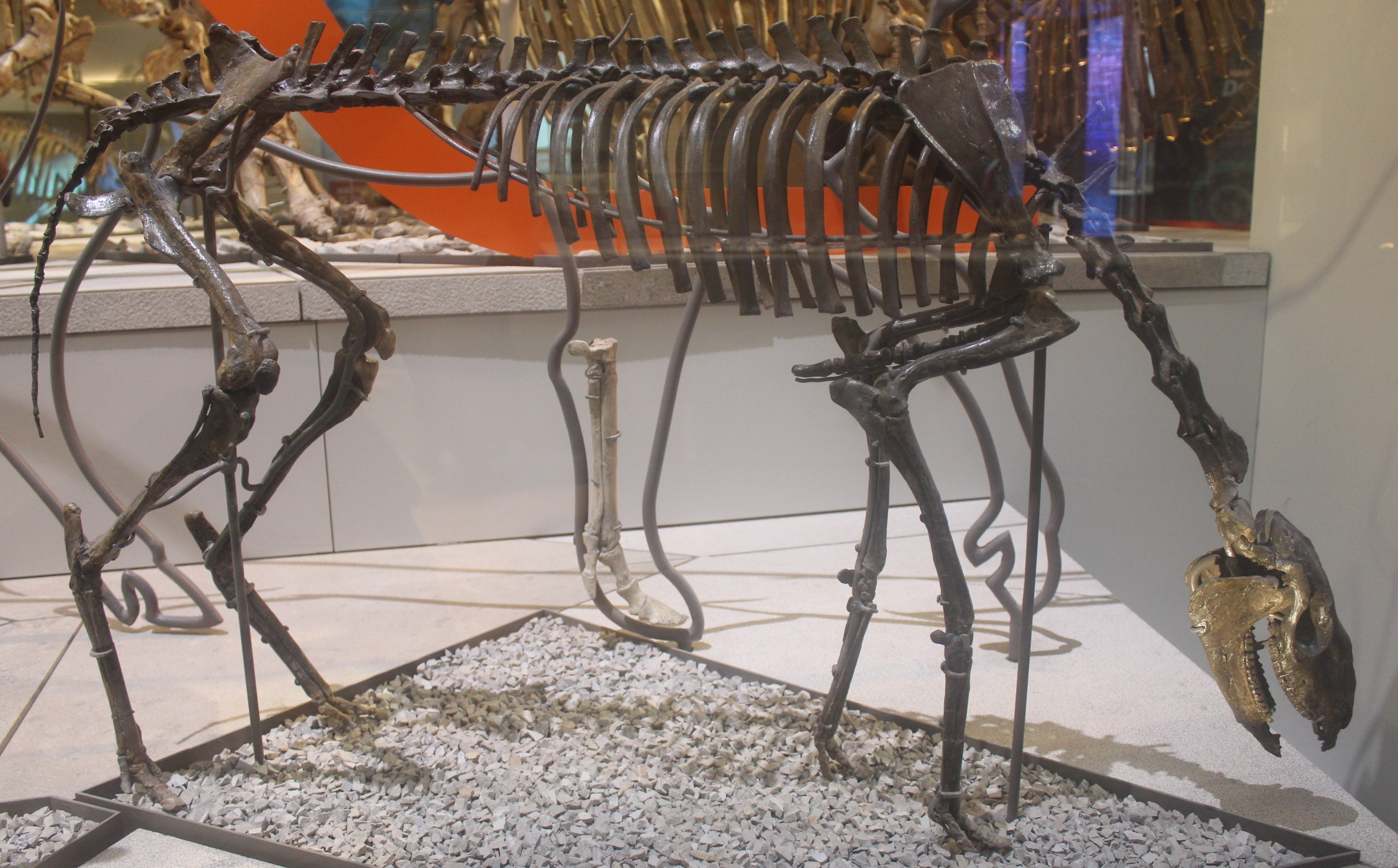
- Desmatippus tyleri composite skeleton, National Museum of Natural History

Scientific classification
- Kingdom: Animalia
- Phylum: Chordata
- Class: Mammalia
- Order: Perissodactyla
- Family: Equidae
- Subfamily: †Anchitheriinae
- Genus: †Desmatippus; Scott 1893

Type species
- †Desmatippus crenidens

Species
- D. avus Marsh 1874; D. crenidens Scott 1893

= Desmatippus =

Extinct genus of mammals

Desmatippus is an extinct, three-toed, browsing member of the Equidae. It lived in what is now North America during the Miocene period (about 23 mya to 5 mya). Desmatippus was 60 cm in height and 20 kg in weight.
