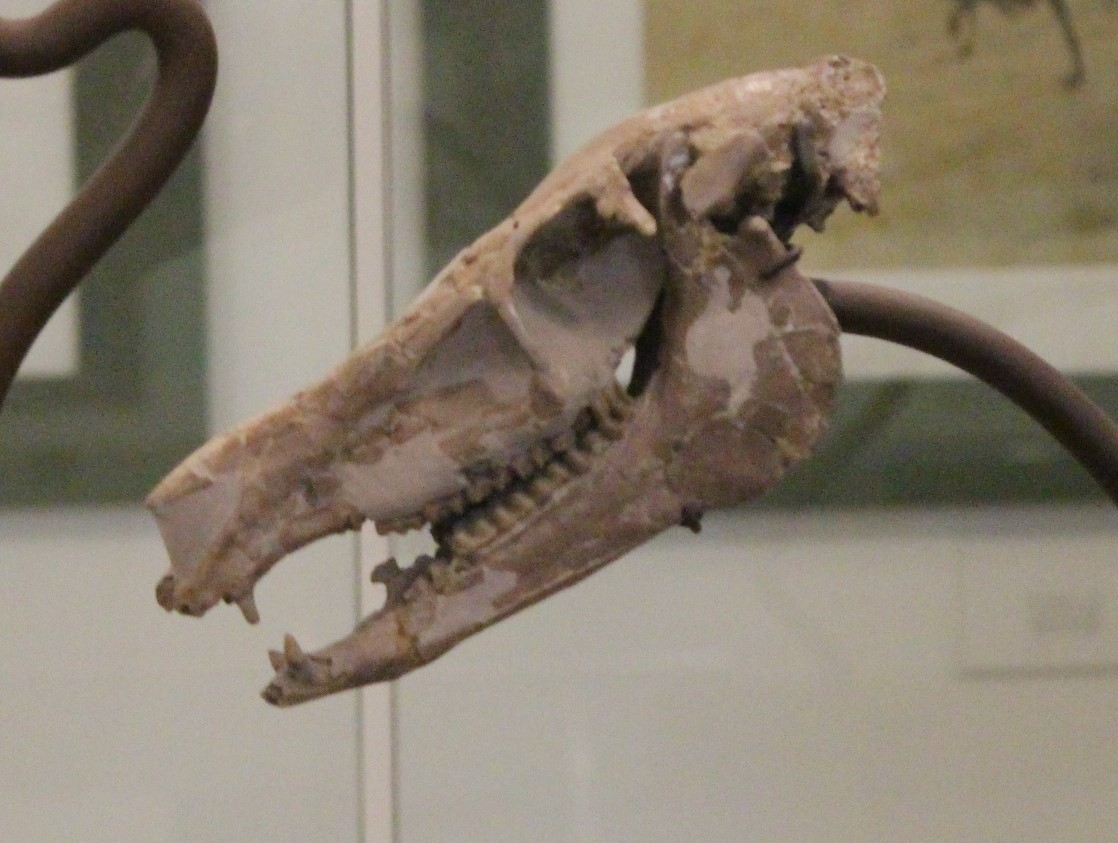
- Reconstructed skull of A. blackbergi, American Museum of Natural History

Scientific classification
- Kingdom: Animalia
- Phylum: Chordata
- Class: Mammalia
- Order: Perissodactyla
- Family: Equidae
- Subfamily: †Anchitheriinae
- Genus: †Archaeohippus; Gidley, 1906

Species
- A. blackbergi (Hay, 1924); A. mannulus O'Sullivan, 2003; A. mourningi (Merriam, 1913); A. penultimus Matthew, 1924; "A." stenolophus (Lambe, 1905); A. ultimus (Cope, 1886) (type)

= Archaeohippus =

Archaeohippus Temporal range: 30.8–13.6 Ma Early Oligocene to middle Miocene

Extinct genus of mammals

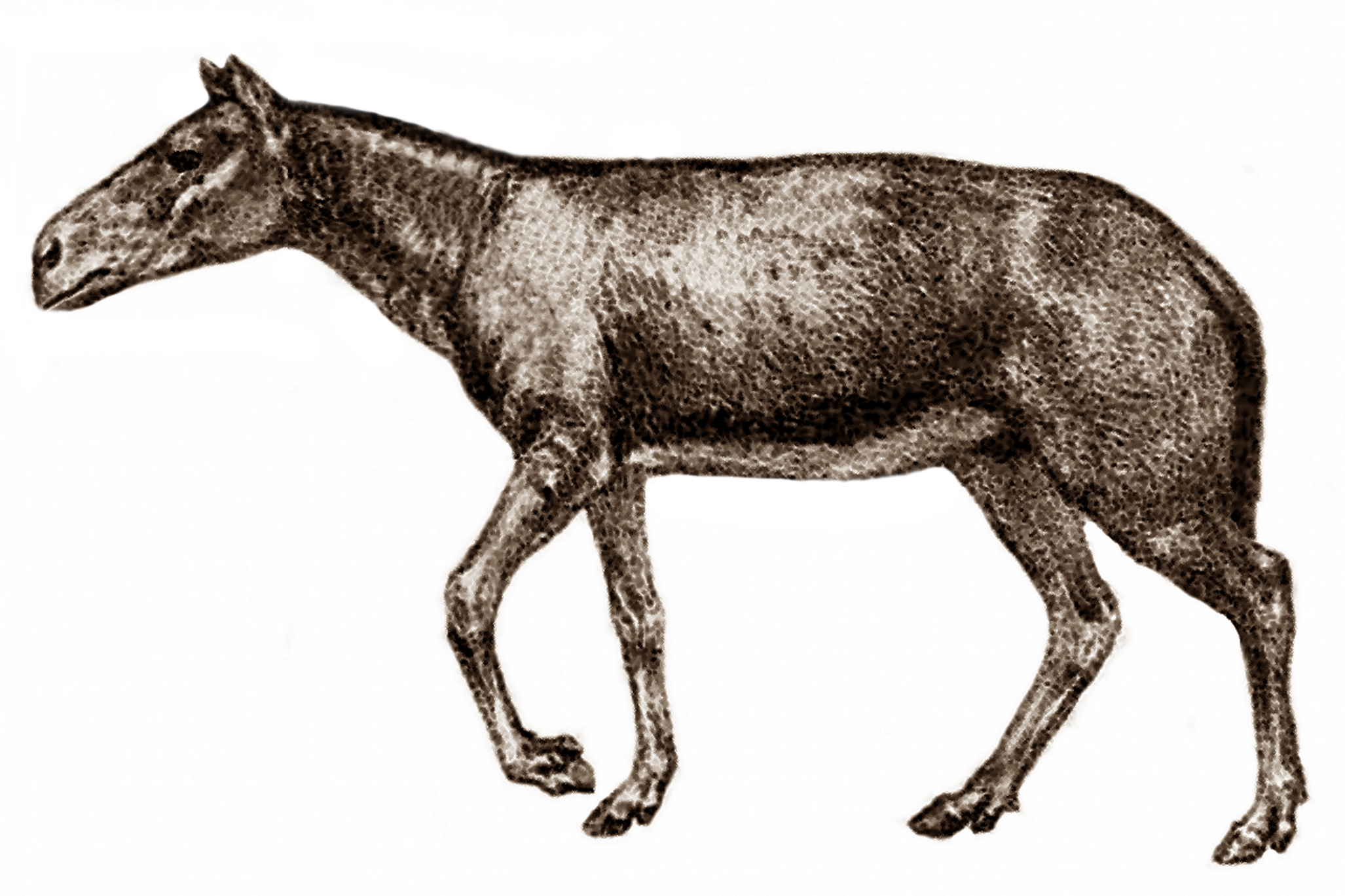
Life restoration

Archaeohippus (Greek: "ancient" (archaios), "horse" (hippos)) is an extinct three-toed member of the family Equidae known from fossils of early Oligocene to middle Miocene age. The genus is noted for several distinct skeletal features. The skull possesses deeply pocketed fossa in a notably long preorbital region. The genus is considered an example of phyletic dwarfism with adults estimated at being on average 20 kilograms in weight. This is in contrast to the most common equid of the period, Miohippus. Characters of the teeth show a mix of both primitive and advanced traits. The advanced traits are very similar to those shown in the genus Parahippus. The noted similarities of Archaeohippus and Parahippus show them to be descended from a common ancestor. They are considered sister species.

== Taxonomic history ==
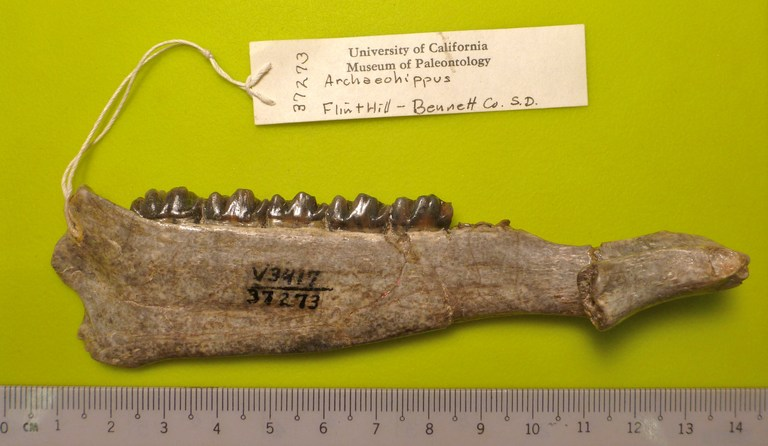
A. blackbergi lower jaw

The first species to be named was found in the Miocene Mascall Fauna of Cottonwood Creek, Oregon. Named Anchitherium ultimus the species was described in 1886 by noted paleontologist, E. D. Cope during the height of the Bone Wars. During study 1906 on the Mascall formation equids, J. Gidley moved to a new genus he named Archaeohippus. The strong similarity of the traits resulted in the genus being considered a subgenus of Parahippus by W. D. Matthew in 1932. In stark contrast of opinion Archaeohippus was revalidated by D.F. Bode in 1933, and along with A. ultimus, he included A. mourningi and A. penultimus. Archaeohippus ranged across all of North America. In addition to the occurrences in Florida and Oregon, fossil specimens have been found in Southern Saskatchewan, Canada. At the other end of its range Archaeohippus have been found as far south as the Miocene Gaillard Cut local in the former canalzone of Panama. "Archaeohippus" stenolophus, known from Oligocene deposits in Saskatchewan, does not belong in Archaeohippus, and A. minimus is a composite of two taxa, as noted by Osborn (1918), with the P3-M1 belonging to A. ultimus and the molar and premolar belonging to a larger, more derived equid. Archaeohippus mannulus and Arachaeohippus blackbergi have been unearthed in Florida, specifically at the Thomas Farm Site.

In at least part of its range Archaeohippus dwelt in a forested or wooded habitat.
