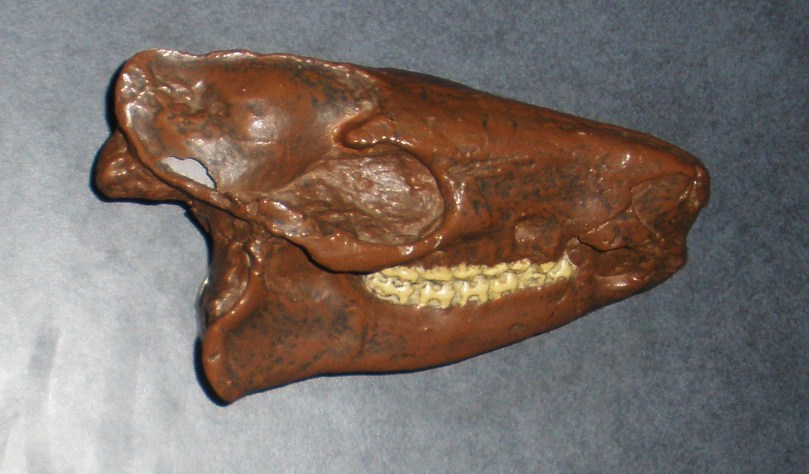
- Pliolophus vulpiceps, Natural History Museum, London
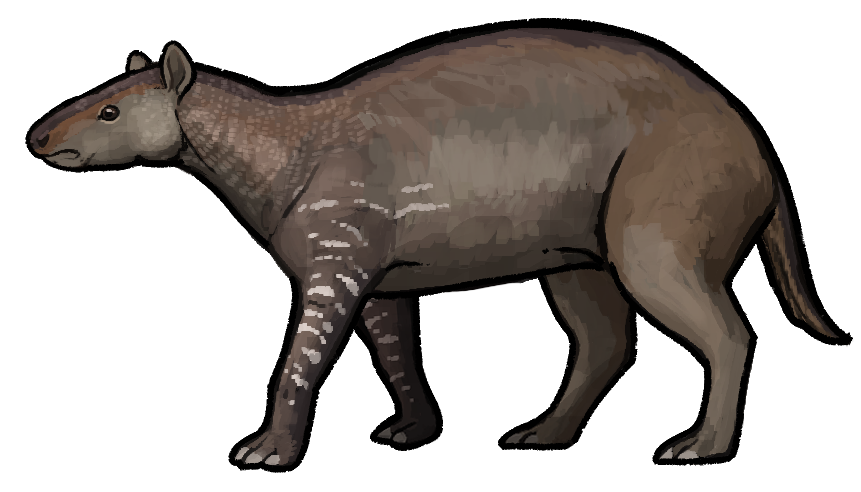
- Restoration of Pliolophus vulpiceps

Scientific classification
- Kingdom: Animalia
- Phylum: Chordata
- Class: Mammalia
- Order: Perissodactyla
- Family: Equidae
- Genus: †Pliolophus; Owen, 1858

Type species
- P. vulpiceps

Species
- †P. quesnoyensis Bronnert et al., 2017; †P. vulpiceps Owen, 1858

= Pliolophus =

Pliolophus Temporal range: Early Eocene

Extinct genus of mammals

Pliolophus is an extinct equid that lived in the Early Eocene of Britain.

== See also ==
- Evolution of the horse
