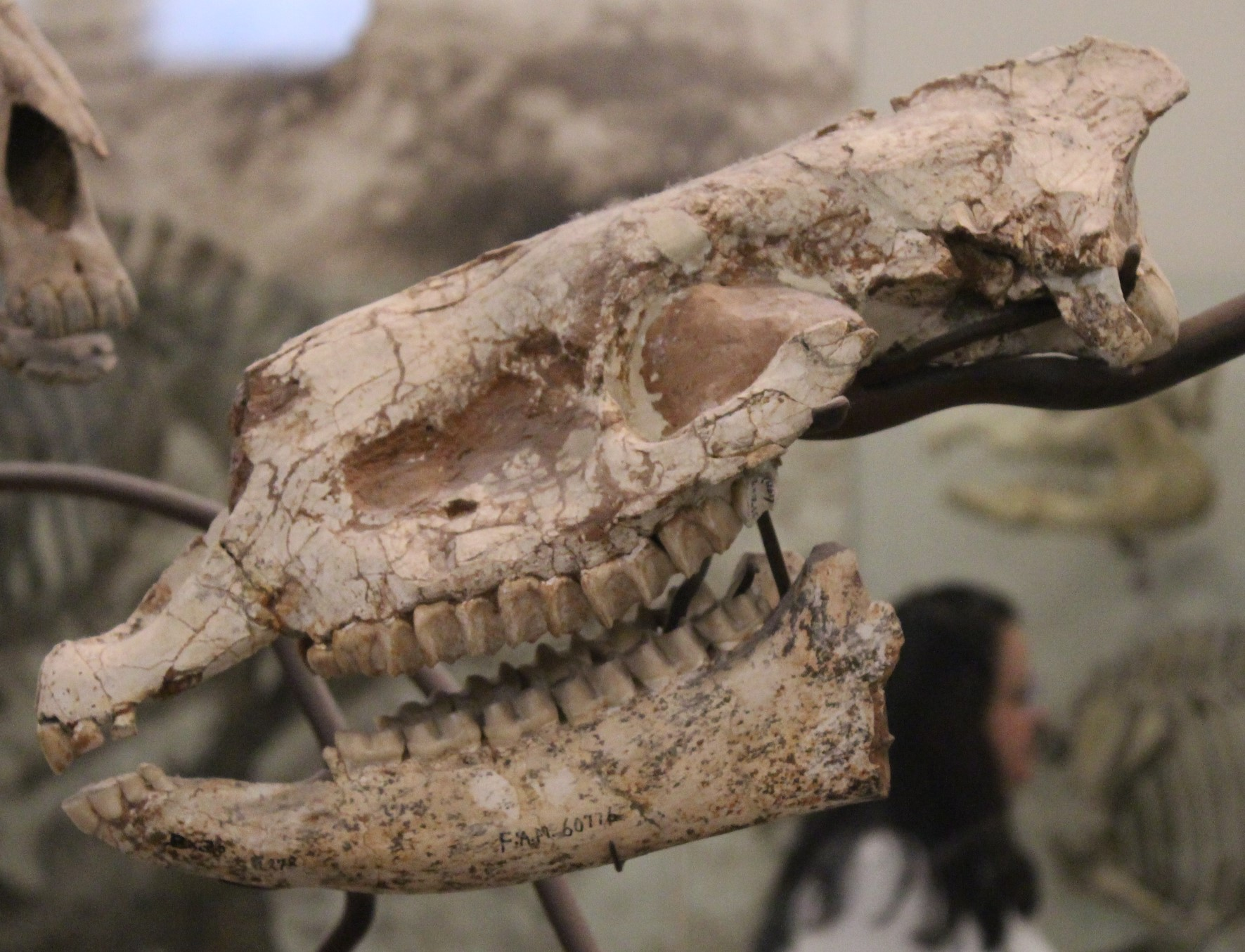
- Sinohippus zitteli skull, American Museum of Natural History

Scientific classification
- Domain: Eukaryota
- Kingdom: Animalia
- Phylum: Chordata
- Class: Mammalia
- Order: Perissodactyla
- Family: Equidae
- Subfamily: †Anchitheriinae
- Genus: †Sinohippus; Zhai, 1962

Species
- S. sampelayoi; S. zitteli

= Sinohippus =

Extinct genus of mammals

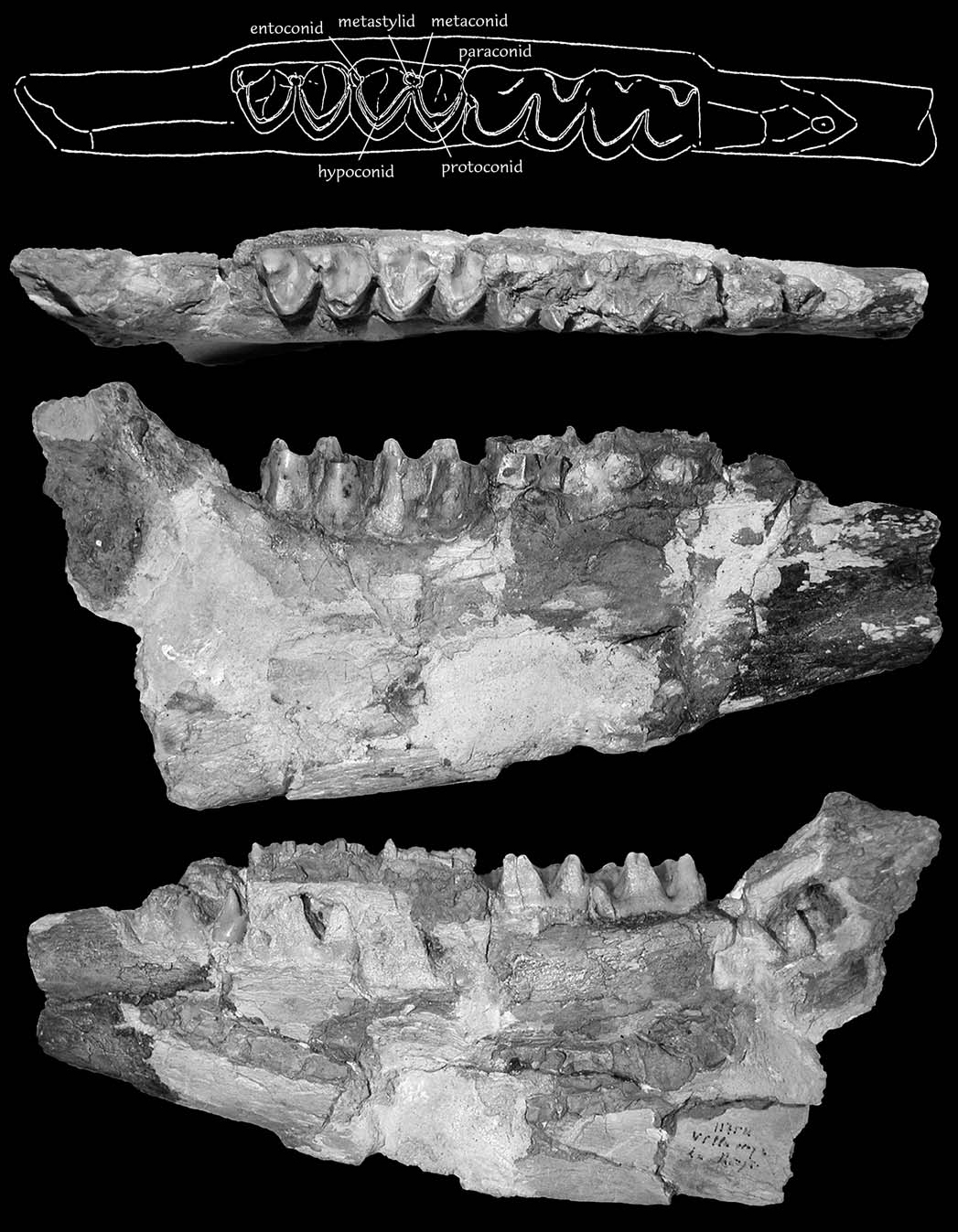
Holotype of S. sampelayoi

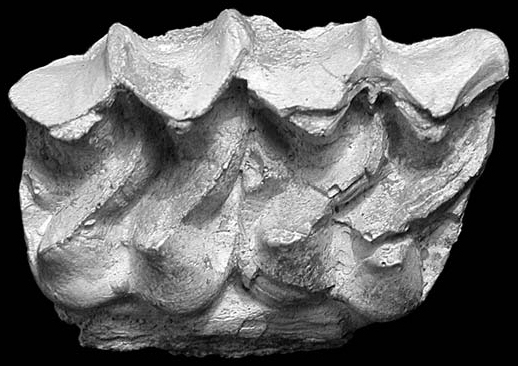
Fragment of a S. sampelayoi maxilla

Sinohippus ("Chinese horse") is an extinct equid genus belonging to the subfamily Anchitheriinae.
