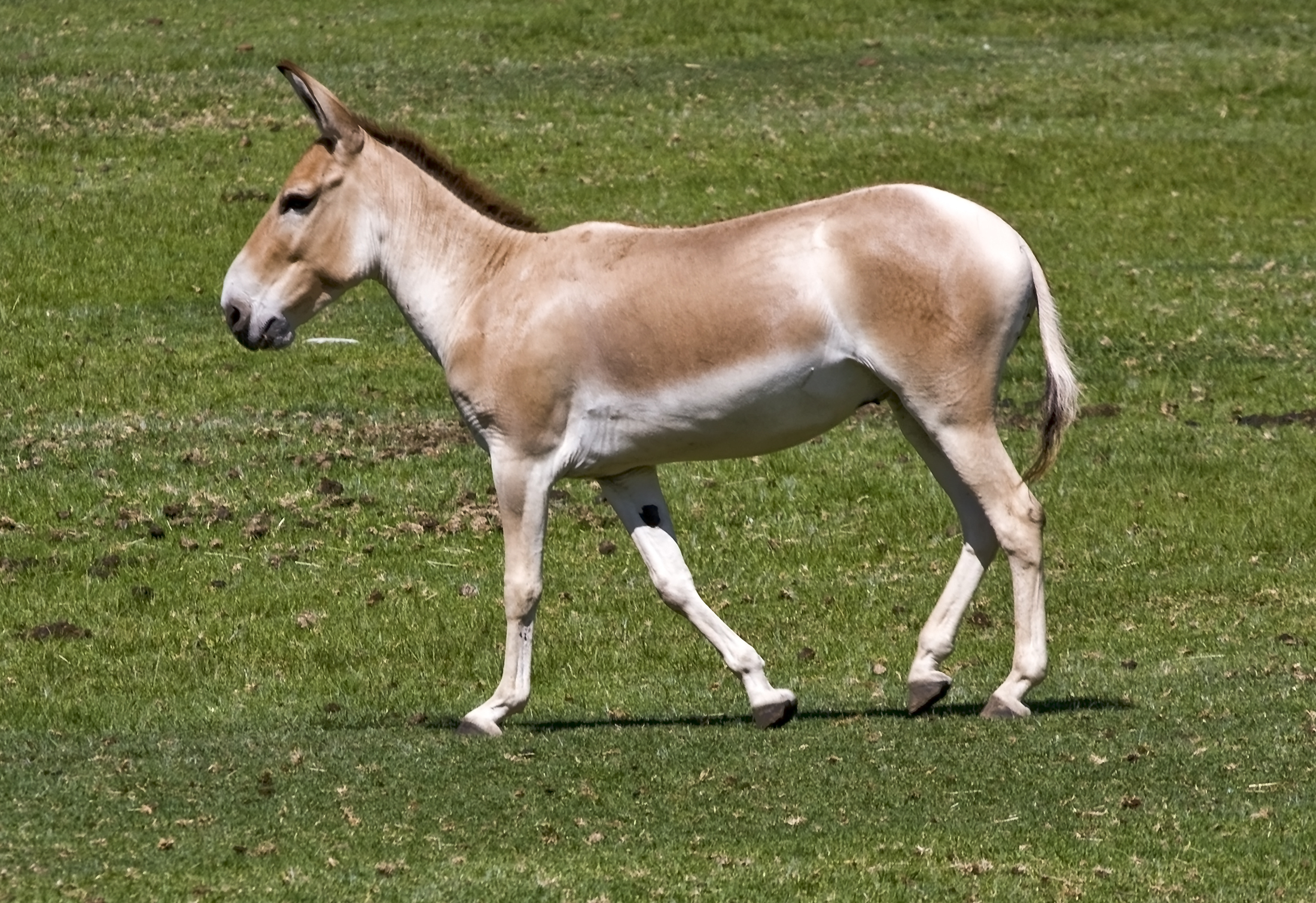
- Persian onager

Scientific classification
- Kingdom: Animalia
- Phylum: Chordata
- Class: Mammalia
- Order: Perissodactyla
- Superfamily: Equoidea
- Family: Equidae; Gray, 1821

Subfamilies
- †Eohippinae; †Anchitheriinae; Equinae
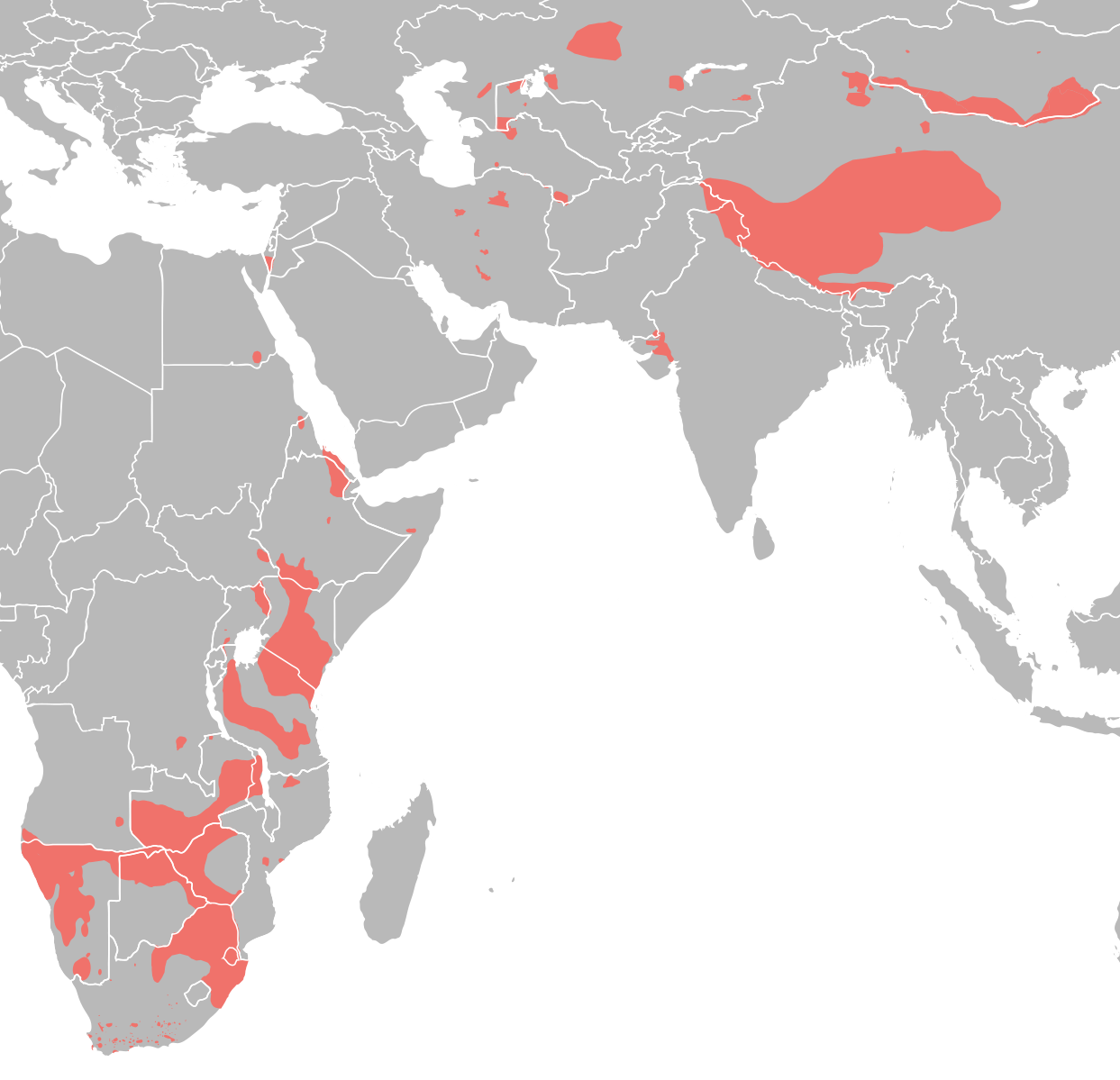
- Equidae distribution (excluding domesticated horse and donkey)

= Equidae =

Equidae Temporal range: 55.8–0 Ma Early Eocene - Recent

Family of hoofed mammals

Equidae (commonly known as the horse family) is the taxonomic family of horses and related animals, including asses, zebras, and many extinct species known only from fossils. The family evolved more than 50 million years ago, in the Eocene epoch, from a small, multi-toed ungulate into larger, single-toed animals. All extant species are in the genus Equus, which originated in North America. Equidae belongs to the order Perissodactyla, which includes the extant tapirs and rhinoceros, and several extinct families. It is more specifically grouped within the superfamily Equoidea, the only other family being the extinct Palaeotheriidae.

The term equid refers to any member of this family, including any equine.

== Evolution ==
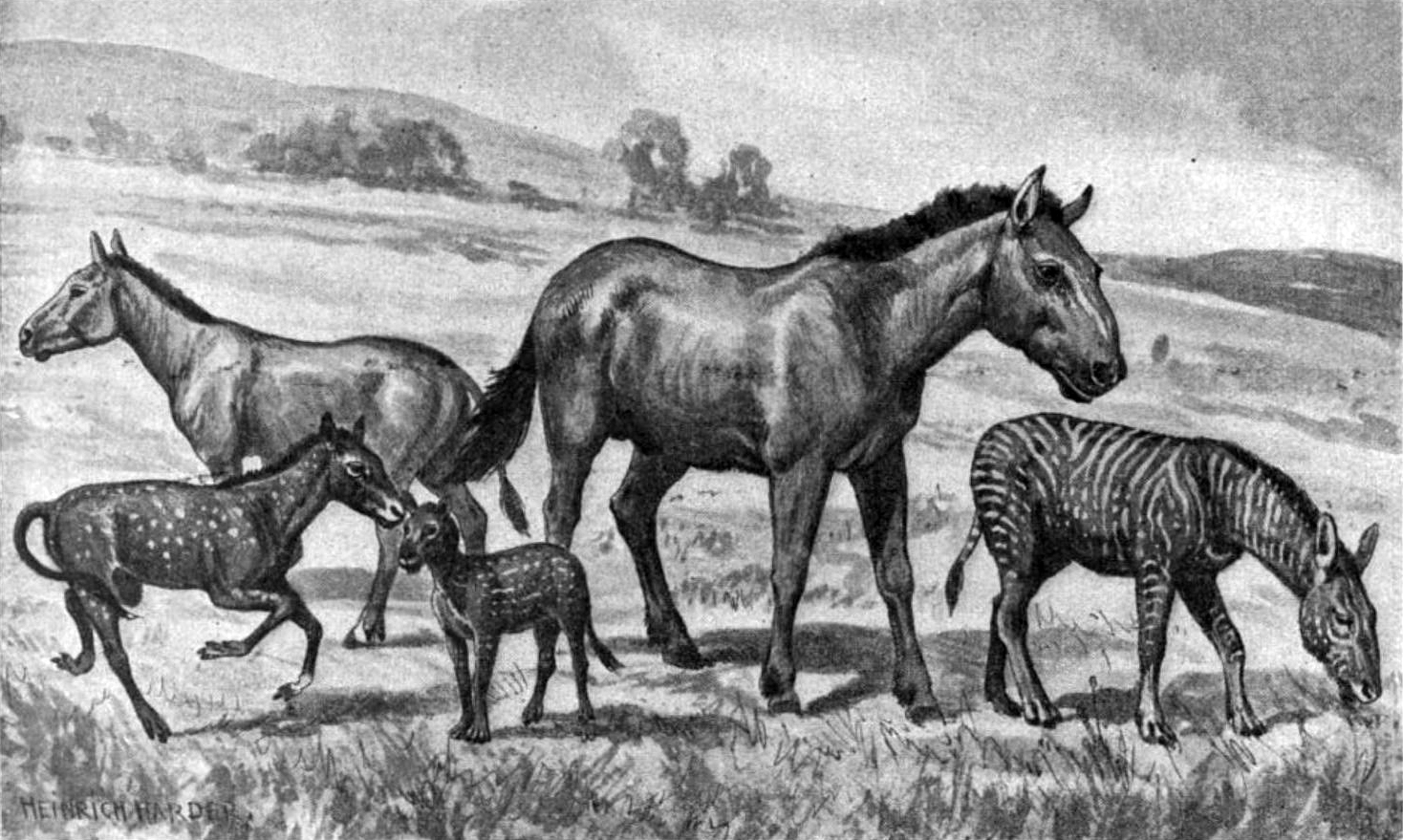
Extinct equids restored to scale. Left to right: Mesohippus, Neohipparion, Eohippus, Equus scotti and Hypohippus

The oldest known fossils assigned to Equidae were found in North America, and date from the early Eocene epoch, 54 million years ago. They were once assigned to the genus Hyracotherium, but the type species of that genus is now regarded as a palaeothere. The other species have been split off into different genera. These early equids were fox-sized animals with three toes on the hind feet, and four on the front feet. They were herbivorous browsers on relatively soft plants, and already adapted for running. The complexity of their brains suggest that they already were alert and intelligent animals. Later species reduced the number of toes, and developed teeth more suited for grinding up grasses and other tough plant food.

The equids, like other perissodactyls, are hindgut fermenters. They have evolved specialized teeth that cut and shear tough plant matter to accommodate their fibrous diet. Their seemingly inefficient digestion strategy is a result of their size at the time of its evolution, as they would have already had to be relatively large mammals to be supported on such a strategy.

The family became relatively diverse during the Miocene epoch, with many new species appearing. By this time, equids were more truly horse-like, having developed the typical body shape of the modern animals. Many of these species bore the main weight of their bodies on their central third toe, with the others becoming reduced and barely touching the ground, if at all. The sole surviving genus, Equus, had evolved by the early Pleistocene epoch, and spread rapidly through the world.

== Classification ==
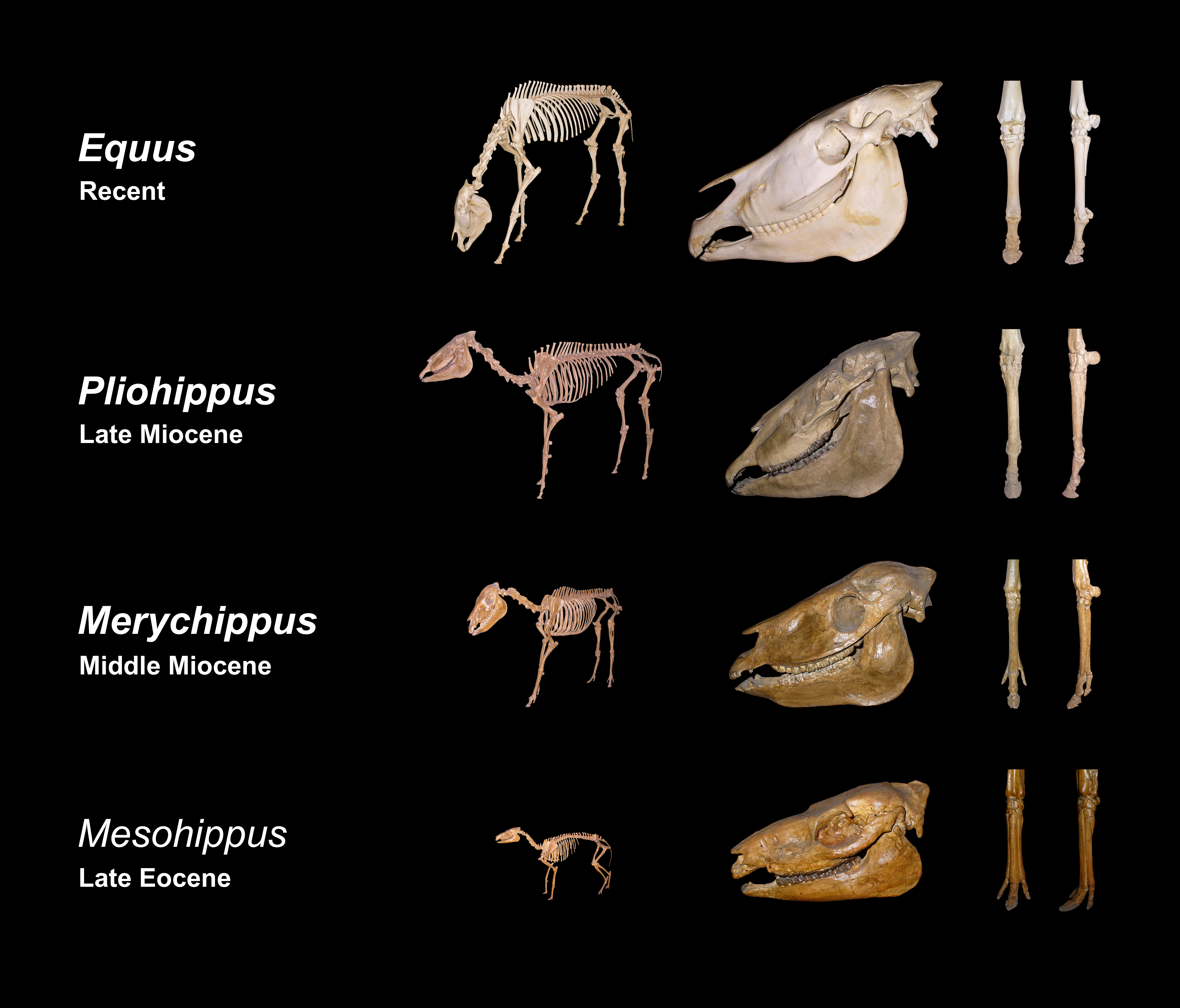
Skeletons

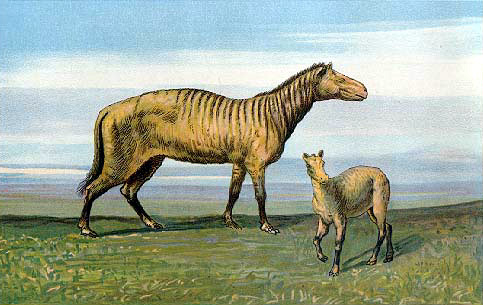
Protorohippus

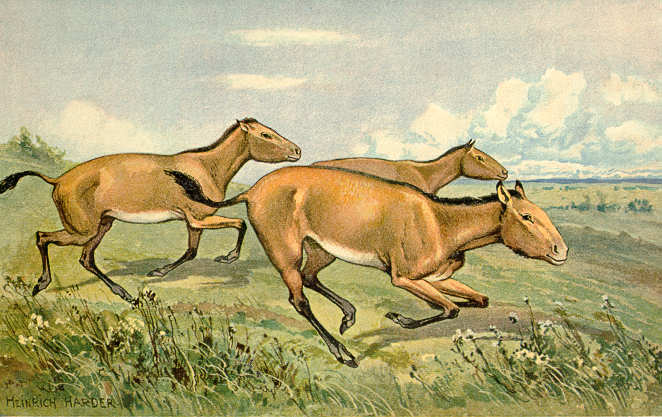
Hipparion

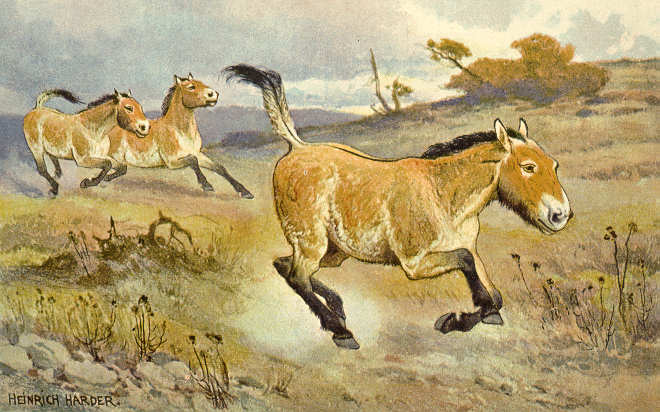
Equus (Przewalski's horse)

- Order Perissodactyla (In addition to Equidae, Perissodactyla includes four species of tapir in a single genus, as well as five living species (belonging to four genera) of rhinoceros.) † indicates extinct taxa.
  - Family Equidae
    - Subfamily †Eohippinae
      - Genus †Epihippus
      - Genus †Haplohippus
      - Genus †Eohippus
      - Genus †Minippus
      - Genus †Orohippus
      - Genus †Pliolophus
      - Genus †Protorohippus
      - Genus †Sifrhippus
      - Genus †Xenicohippus
    - Subfamily †Anchitheriinae
      - Genus †Anchitherium
      - Genus †Archaeohippus
      - Genus †Desmatippus
      - Genus †Hypohippus
      - Genus †Kalobatippus
      - Genus †Megahippus
      - Genus †Mesohippus
      - Genus †Miohippus
      - Genus †Parahippus
      - Genus †Sinohippus
    - Subfamily Equinae
      - Genus †Merychippus
      - Genus †Scaphohippus
      - Genus †Acritohippus
      - Tribe †Hipparionini
        - Genus †Eurygnathohippus
        - Genus †Hipparion
        - Genus †Hippotherium
        - Genus †Nannippus
        - Genus †Neohipparion
        - Genus †Proboscidipparion
        - Genus †Pseudhipparion
      - Tribe Equini
        - Genus †Haringtonhippus
        - Genus †Heteropliohippus
        - Genus †Parapliohippus
        - Genus †Calippus
        - Genus †Protohippus
        - Genus †Astrohippus
        - Genus †Dinohippus
        - Genus Equus (22 species, 7 extant)
        - Genus †Cremohipparion
        - Genus †Hippidion
        - Genus †Pliohippus
