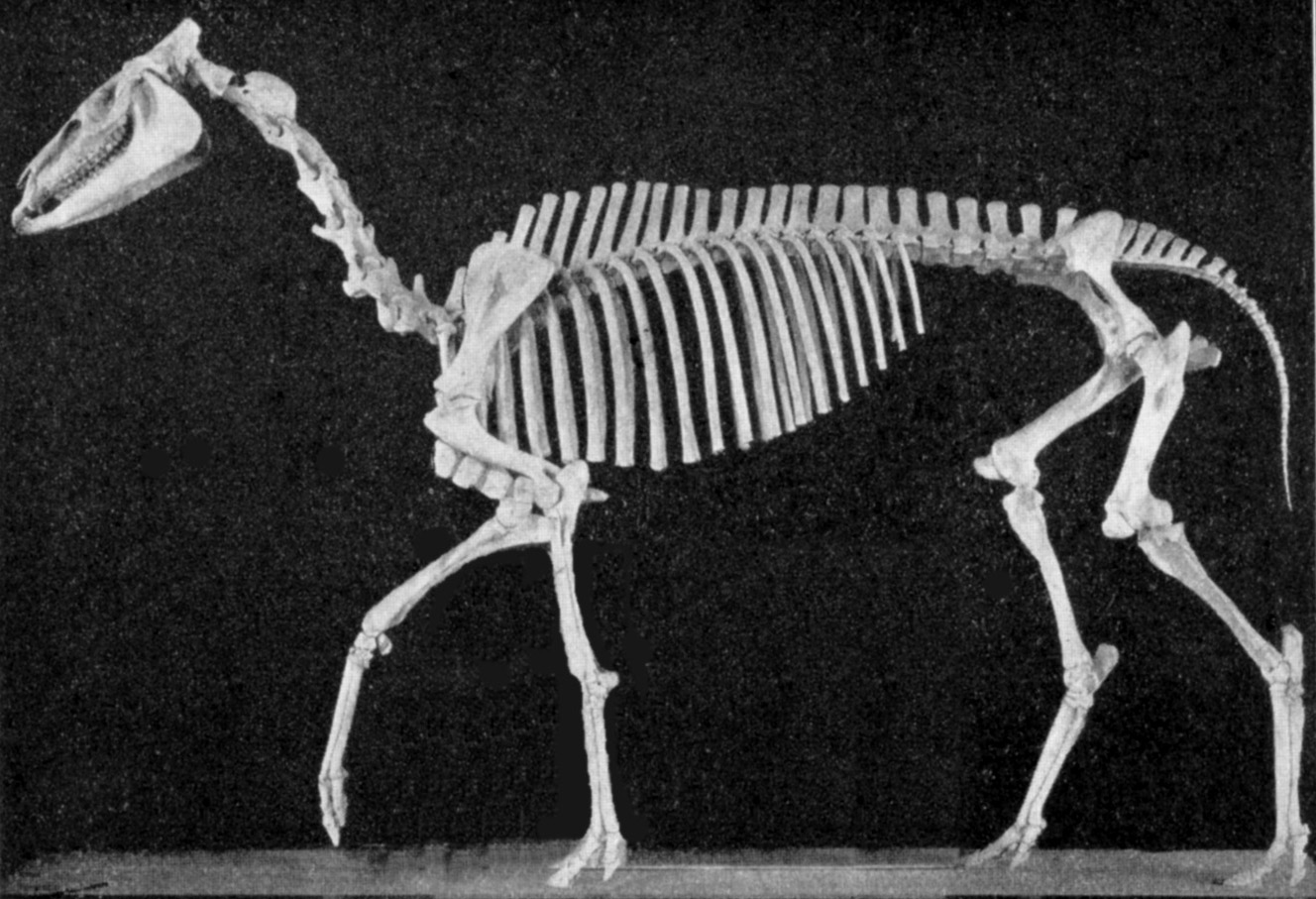
- Hypohippus osborni skeleton

Scientific classification
- Kingdom: Animalia
- Phylum: Chordata
- Class: Mammalia
- Infraclass: Placentalia
- Order: Perissodactyla
- Family: Equidae
- Subfamily: †Anchitheriinae
- Genus: †Hypohippus; Leidy, 1858

Species
- H. affinis Leidy 1858; H. osborni

= Hypohippus =

Hypohippus Temporal range: Barstovian-Clarendonian ~15.97–10.3 Ma

Extinct genus of mammals

Hypohippus is an extinct genus of three-toed horse, which lived 17–11 million years ago. It was the largest anchitherine equid about the size of a modern domestic horse, at 403–600 kg (888–1,323 lb) and 1.8 m (5.9 ft) long. It was a long-necked, high-shouldered browser with sub-hypsodont, lophodont (rhino-like) dentition, that fed on the tough vegetation of forest understory and shrubs. Its deep preorbital fossae and retraction of the nasal notch hint at the presence of a long, muscular and prehensile upper lip that would aid during selective browsing. Overall its ecology would have been more comparable to modern okapi than to grazing horses. Fossils of it have been found in Nebraska, Colorado, and Montana.

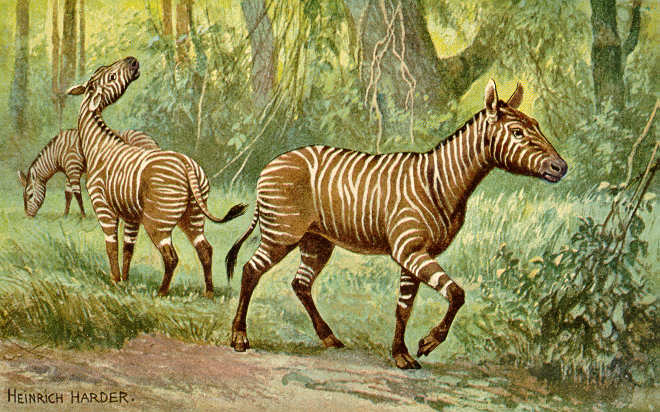
20th century restoration by Heinrich Harder.

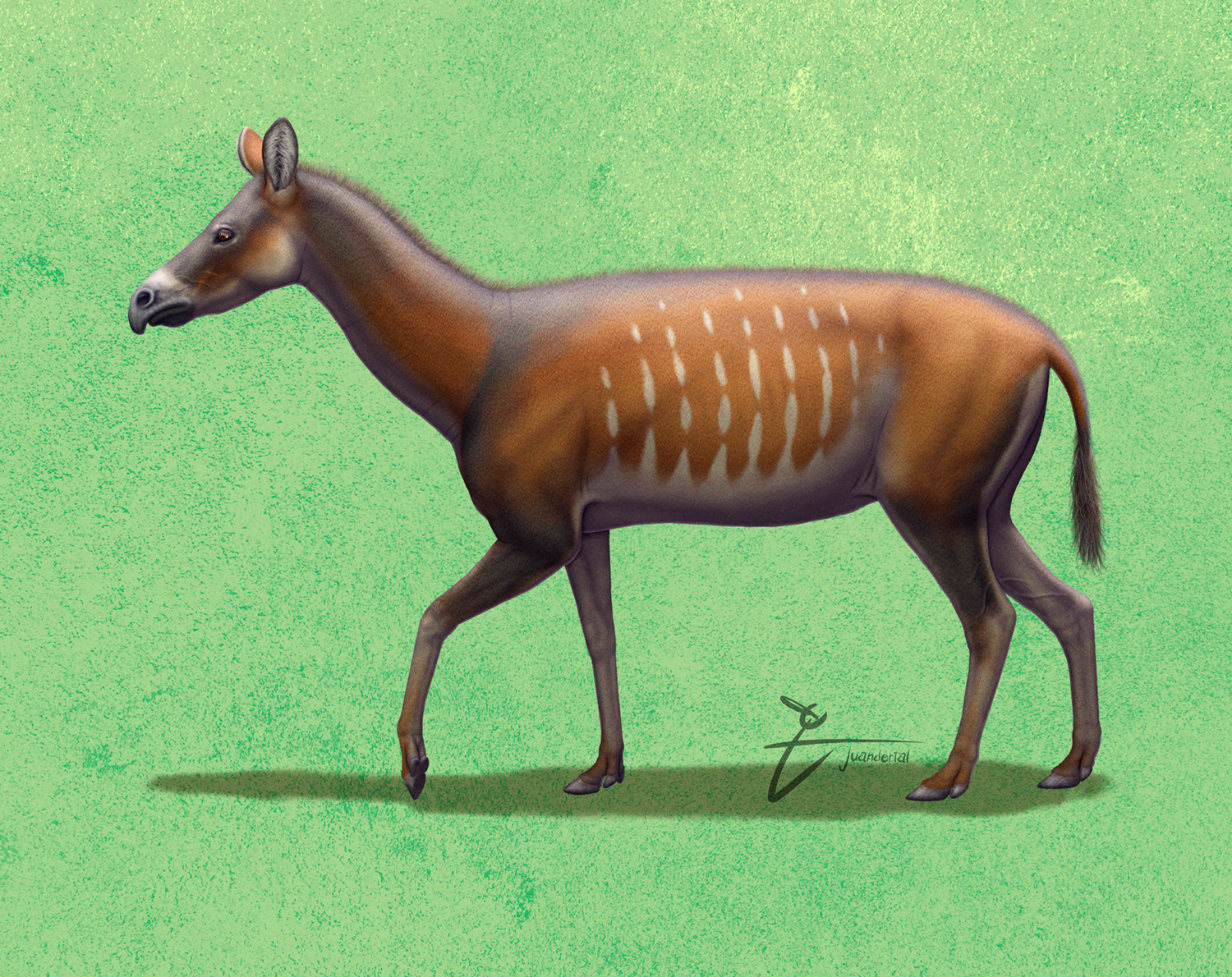
Life restoration showing a prominent, prehensile upper lip.
