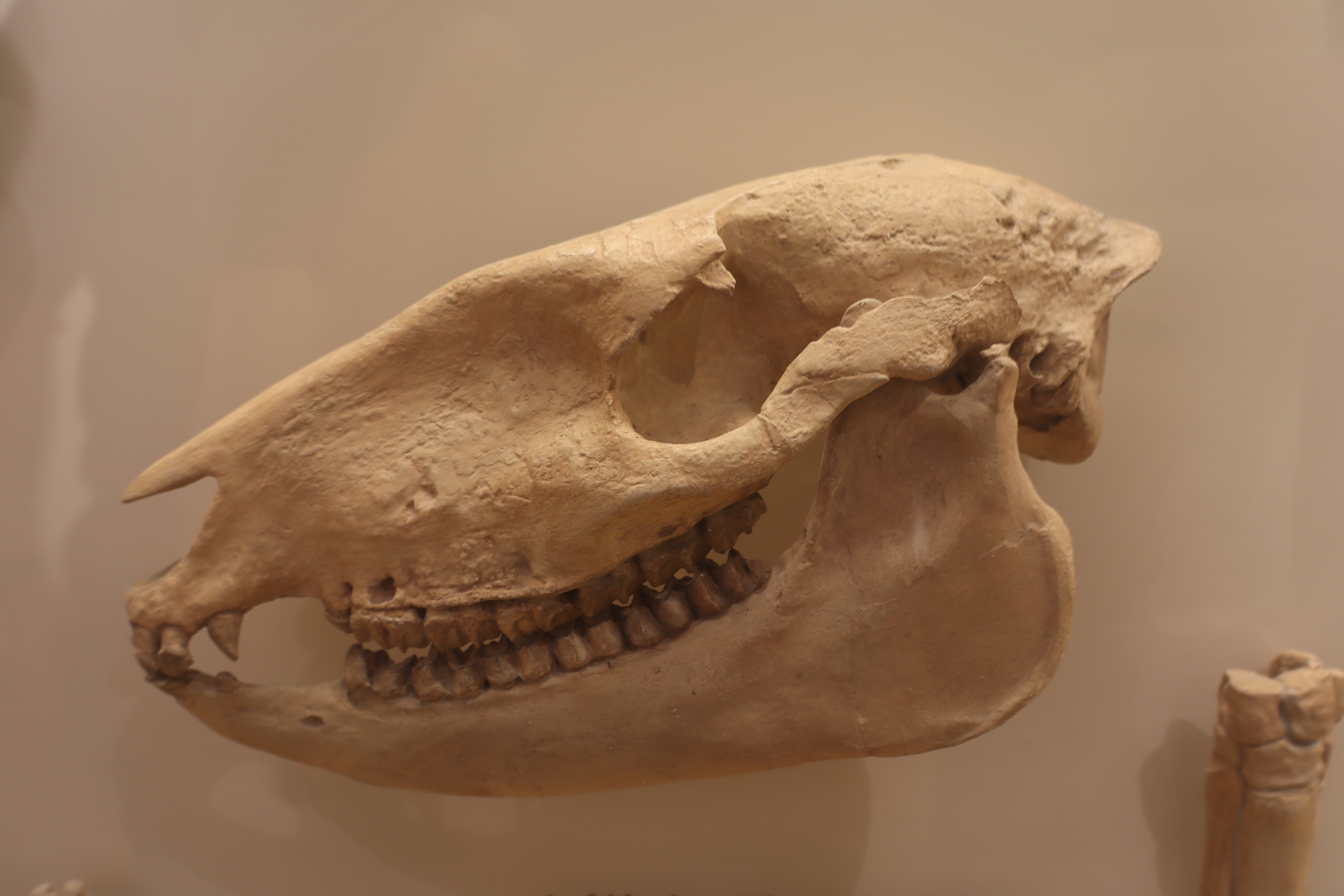
- Fossil skull, Harvard Museum of Natural History

Scientific classification
- Kingdom: Animalia
- Phylum: Chordata
- Class: Mammalia
- Infraclass: Placentalia
- Order: Perissodactyla
- Family: Equidae
- Subfamily: †Anchitheriinae
- Genus: †Anchitherium von Meyer, 1844

Type species
- Anchitherium aurelianense

Species
- A. alberdiae; A. aurelianense; A. australis; A. castellanum; A. clarencei; A. corcolense; A. cursor; A. ezquerrae; A. gobiense; A. hippoides; A. matritense; A. navasotae; A. parequinum; A. procerum

= Anchitherium =

Anchitherium Temporal range: Miocene

Extinct genus of mammals

Anchitherium (meaning near beast) is a genus of extinct equid with a three-toed hoof.

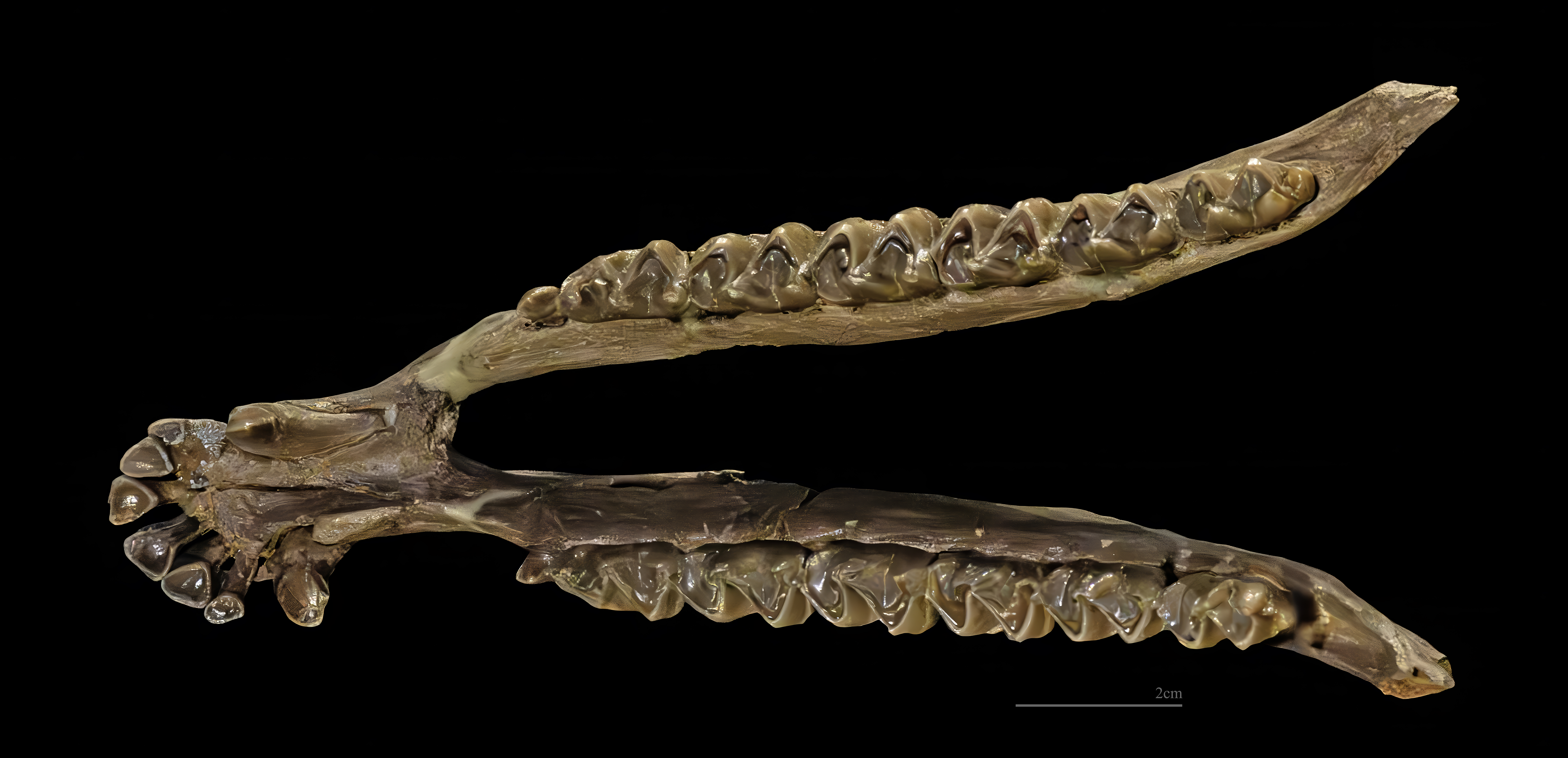
Mandibles

Anchitherium was a browsing (leaf eating) horse that originated in the early Miocene of North America, being found as far south as Panama, and subsequently dispersed to Europe and Asia, where it gave rise to the larger bodied genus Sinohippus. It was around 60 centimetres (24 in; 6 hands) high at the shoulder, and probably represented a side-branch of horse evolution that left no modern descendants.

== Palaeobiology ==
=== Life history ===
Compared to the modern plains zebra, Anchitherium had a lower daily secretion rate (DSR) of enamel, but a substantially faster enamel extension rate (EER) in the cusps of its teeth. However, the EER of Anchitherium was substantially lower than that of the plains zebra in the cervical and middle regions of the crown.

=== Palaeoecology ===
The dental microwear and mesowear of Anchitherium aurelianense show that it had a browsing diet.
