= Astrohippus =

Astrohippus Temporal range: 16.3–4.9 Ma Barstovian to Late Hemphillian

Scientific classification
- Kingdom: Animalia
- Phylum: Chordata
- Class: Mammalia
- Order: Perissodactyla
- Family: Equidae
- Subfamily: Equinae
- Tribe: Equini
- Genus: †Astrohippus; Quinn, 1955

Species
- †A. ansae; †A. stockii (syn. A. albidens)

Extinct genus of mammals

Astrohippus is an extinct member of the Equidae tribe Equini, the same tribe that contains the only living equid genus, Equus. Fossil remains have been found in the central United States, Florida, and the Mexican states of Chihuahua, Jalisco, and Guanajuato. The fossils date in time from the oldest dating from the Barstovian in the Miocene to the youngest dating in the Hemphillian faunal stage of the early Pliocene.

Based on study of the tooth morphology it is considered unlikely that Astrohippus could be an ancestor of modern horses, with the most likely ancestor of Astrohippus being Pliohippus.

The species Astrohippus ansae was originally described by W. D. Matthew and R. A. Stirton based on several cheek teeth found in the Coffee Ranch quarry, Hemphill County, Texas. This quarry has produced the remains of six other equid genera including Dinohippus and Nannippus. Astrohippus stockii was described from the Yepómera locality in Chihuahua, Mexico, by J.F. Lance in 1950 as Pliohippus stockii. The species was moved to Astrohippus five years later by Quinn. The species Astrohippus albidens was named by O. Mooser in 1965 from Mexico, the taxon was reassigned to the genus Dinohippus in 1988 by T. S. Kelly and E. B. Lander. In 1998 A. stockii and A. albidens were combined by T. S. Kelly, with the older A. stockii name being retained and A. albidens becoming a junior synonym.

Both species of Astrohippus were reported in the Ocote Local Fauna of Guanajuato, Mexico by O. Mooser in 1973.

== Palaeobiology ==
=== Palaeoecology ===
With remains of A. ansae from the Coffee Ranch site of Texas having a dental mesowear score of 2.53, palaeodietary analysis concludes that A. ansae was a grazer. Additionally, combined mesowear and microwear analysis of A. stockii from Arroyo La Carreta, a site in Guanajuato dating back to the latest Hemphillian, has shown it mainly ate abrasive foods such as grasses, while δ^{13}C analysis has found that it ate a mixture of both C_{3} and C_{4} plants, with a preference for the latter. This suggests a high degree of dietary flexibility in this species.
