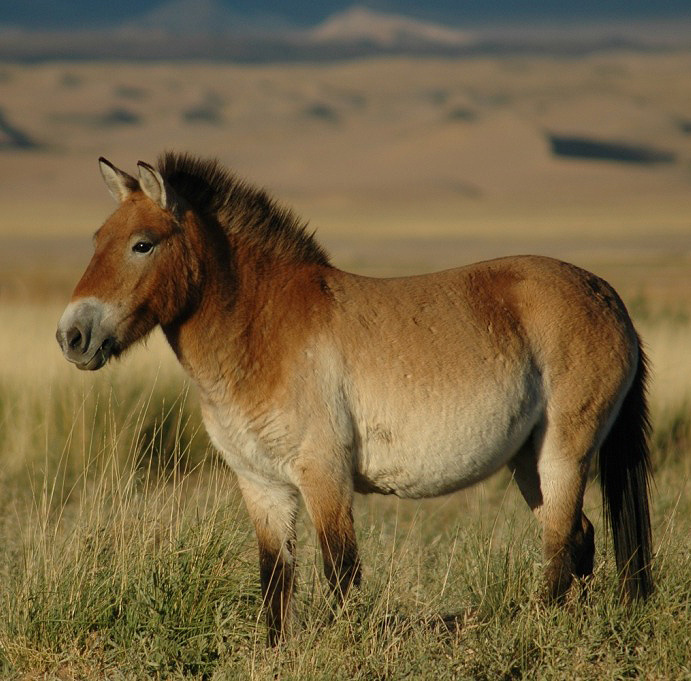
- Przewalski's horse
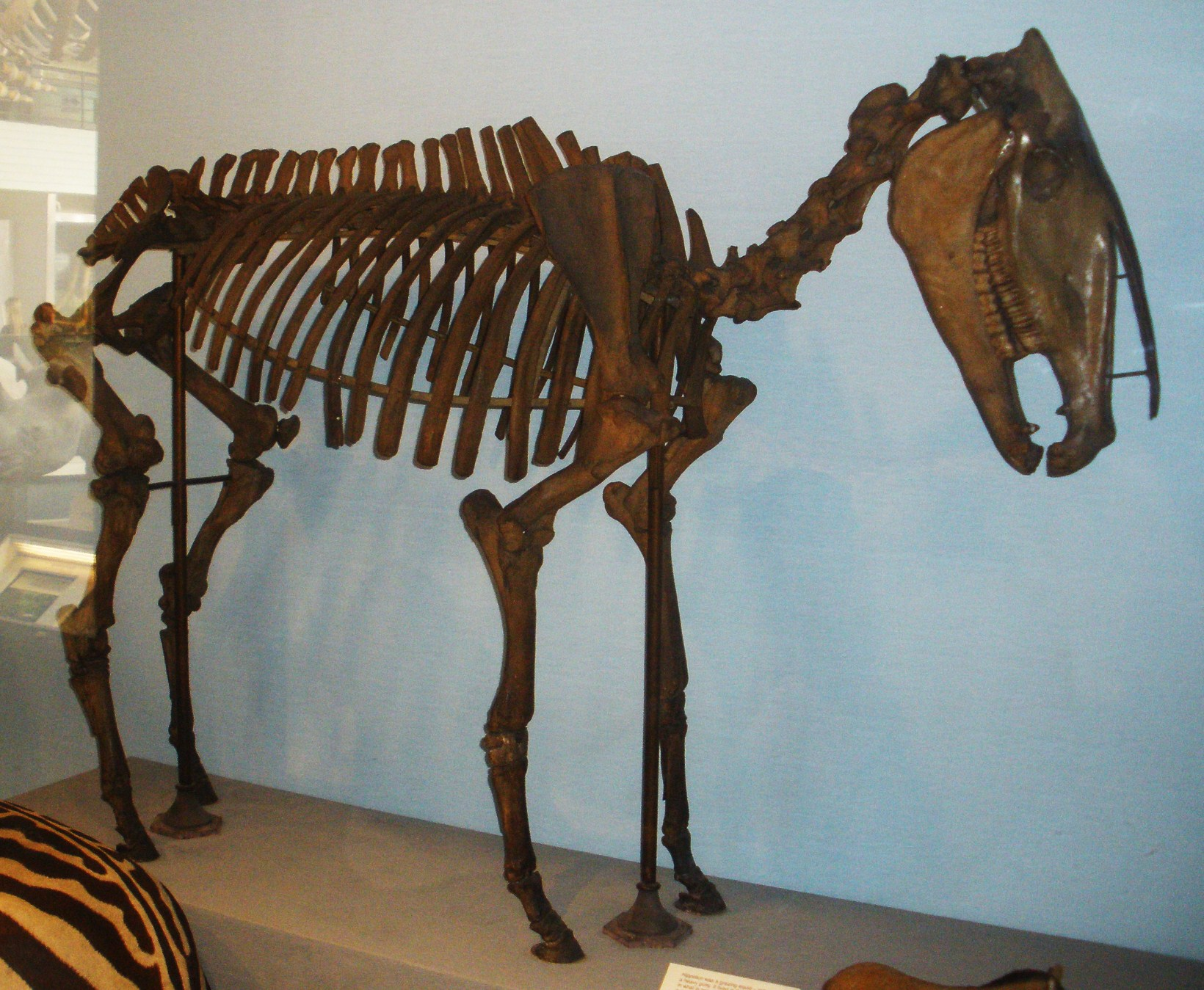
- Skeleton of Hippidion

Scientific classification
- Kingdom: Animalia
- Phylum: Chordata
- Class: Mammalia
- Order: Perissodactyla
- Family: Equidae
- Subfamily: Equinae
- Tribe: Equini; Quinn, 1955

Genera
- †Astrohippus; †Calippus; †Dinohippus; Equus; †Haringtonhippus; †Hippidion; †Pliohippus; †Protohippus

= Equini =

Equini Temporal range: 15.97–0 Ma Middle Miocene to present

Extinct tribe of mammals

Equini is the only living tribe of the subfamily Equinae, which has lived worldwide (except Australia) since the Hemingfordian stage of the Middle Miocene (16–0 mya). It is considered to be a monophyletic clade.

== Taxonomy ==
Tribe: Equini

- Genus: † Astrohippus
- Genus: † Calippus
- Genus: † Dinohippus
- Genus: Equus – living horses, asses, and zebras
- Genus: † Haringtonhippus North America extinct. c. 11,000 years ago
- Genus: † Hippidion South America extinct. c. 11,000 years ago
- Genus: † Pliohippus
- Genus: † Protohippus
