= Streptomyces atriruber =

Scientific classification
- Domain: Bacteria
- Kingdom: Bacillati
- Phylum: Actinomycetota
- Class: Actinomycetes
- Order: Streptomycetales
- Family: Streptomycetaceae
- Genus: Streptomyces
- Species: S. atriruber

Binomial name
- Streptomyces atriruber Labeda et al. 2009

Type strain
- DSM 41860, LDDC 6330-99, NRRL B-24165

Species of bacterium

Streptomyces atriruber is a bacterium species from the genus Streptomyces which has been isolated from an equine placenta in Lexington in Kentucky in the United States.

== See also ==
- List of Streptomyces species
