= Stay apparatus =

Feature of equine anatomy

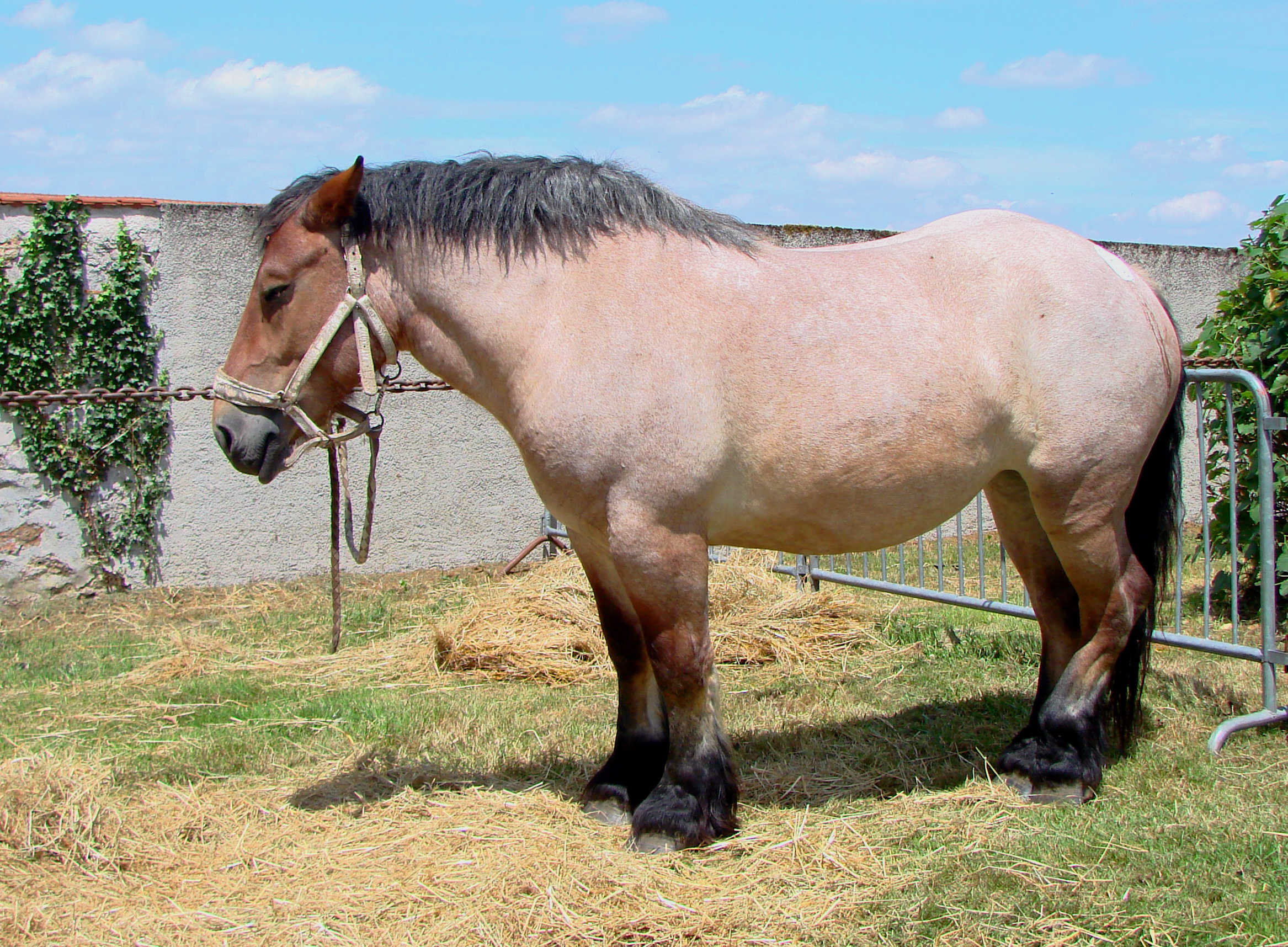
A draft horse sleeping while standing up

The stay apparatus is an arrangement of muscles, tendons, and ligaments that work together so that an animal can remain standing with virtually no muscular effort. It is best known as the mechanism by which horses can enter a light sleep while still standing up. The effect is that an animal can distribute its weight on three limbs while resting a fourth in a flexed, non-weight-bearing position. The animal can periodically shift its weight to rest a different leg, and thus all limbs are able to be individually rested, reducing overall wear and tear. The relatively slim legs of certain large mammals, such as horses and cows, would be subject to dangerous levels of fatigue if not for the stay apparatus.

The lower part of the stay apparatus consists of the suspensory apparatus, which is the same in both front and hind legs, while the upper portion of the stay apparatus is different between the fore and hind limbs.

In the front legs, the stay apparatus engages when the animal's muscles relax. The upper portion of the stay apparatus in the forelimbs includes the major attachment, extensor, and flexor muscles and tendons. In essence, the accessory check ligaments act as tension bands, they stabilize the carpus (called the "knee" in horses), fetlock and bones of the foot. In the upper portion, the shoulder and elbow joints have several musculo-tendinous structures that keep these joints in passive extension.

In the hind limbs, the major muscles, ligaments and tendons along with the reciprocal joints of the hock and stifle, form a reciprocal apparatus that forces the hock and stifle to flex and extend in unison. The medial patellar ligament latches over an enlargement on the femur to "lock" the patella ("kneecap") in place, preventing flexion in the stifle and (via the reciprocal apparatus) the hock.

Cattle have a stay apparatus which allows them to rest individual limbs, but generally do not sleep standing up.

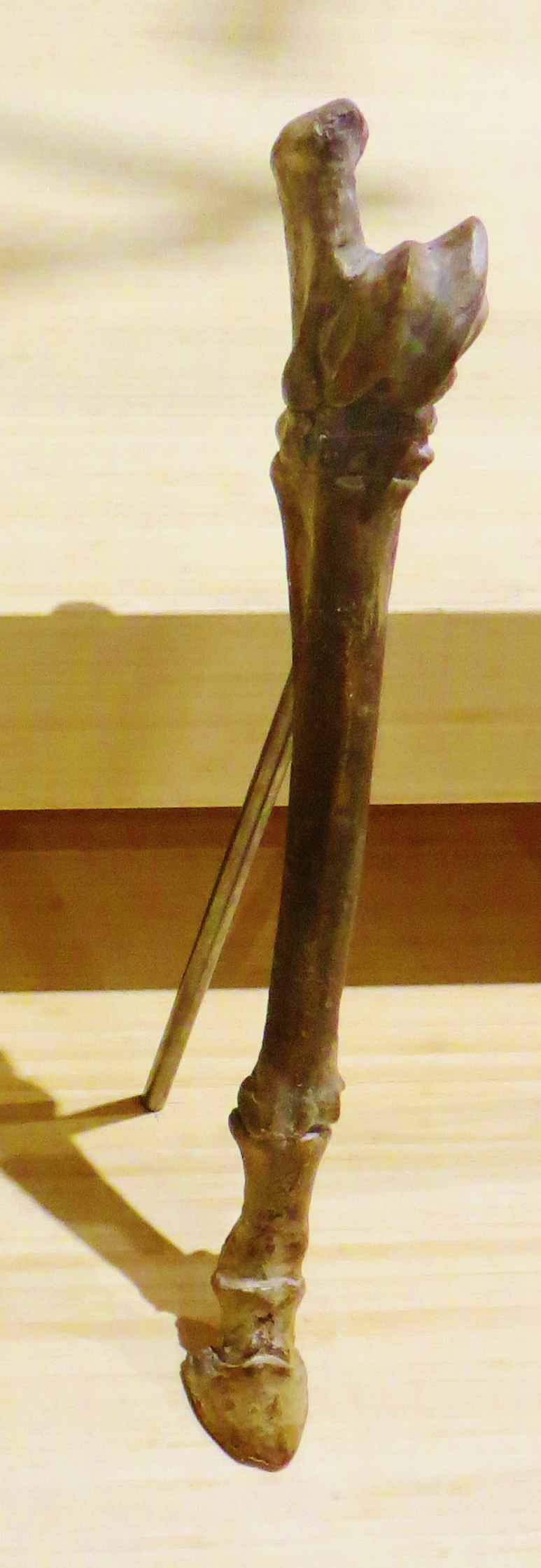
The ancient Dinohippus had a rudimentary stay apparatus

Anatomical structures important in the stay apparatus include:

- The suspensory apparatus consists of the suspensory ligament, originating at the top of the cannon bone, sesamoid bones, and the distal sesamoidean ligaments, which insert onto the two proximal pastern bones.
- Biceps brachii: Primary flexor of elbow. Originates from the cranial side of the scapula and inserts primarily into the radial tuberosity, with an extension called the lacertus fibrosus which joins the extensor carpi radialis tendon, forming the part of the stay apparatus that keeps the elbow and shoulder from bending.
- Triceps brachii: Primary extensor of the elbow, consisting of three heads with a common insertion on the olecranon: the lateral and medial heads, originating on the lateral and medial aspects of the humerus, and the long head, originating on the caudal border of the scapula. Important part of the stay apparatus to keep the elbow fixed.
- Extensor carpi radialis: originates from the humerus, continues distally along the dorsal side of the radius, and inserts on the metacarpal tuberosity. Flexes the elbow, extends the carpus. Also used in the stay apparatus to fix the carpus.
- The patella and patellar ligaments.

The most common of the ancient, now-extinct wild horse species in North America, Dinohippus, had a distinctive passive stay apparatus that helped it conserve energy while standing for long periods. Dinohippus was the first horse to show a rudimentary form of this characteristic, and its existence provided additional evidence of the close relationship between Dinohippus and the modern Equus.
