= Bicipitoradial bursa =

Details

Identifiers
- Latin: Bursa bicipitoradialis
- TA98: A04.8.03.014
- TA2: 2567
- FMA: 42281

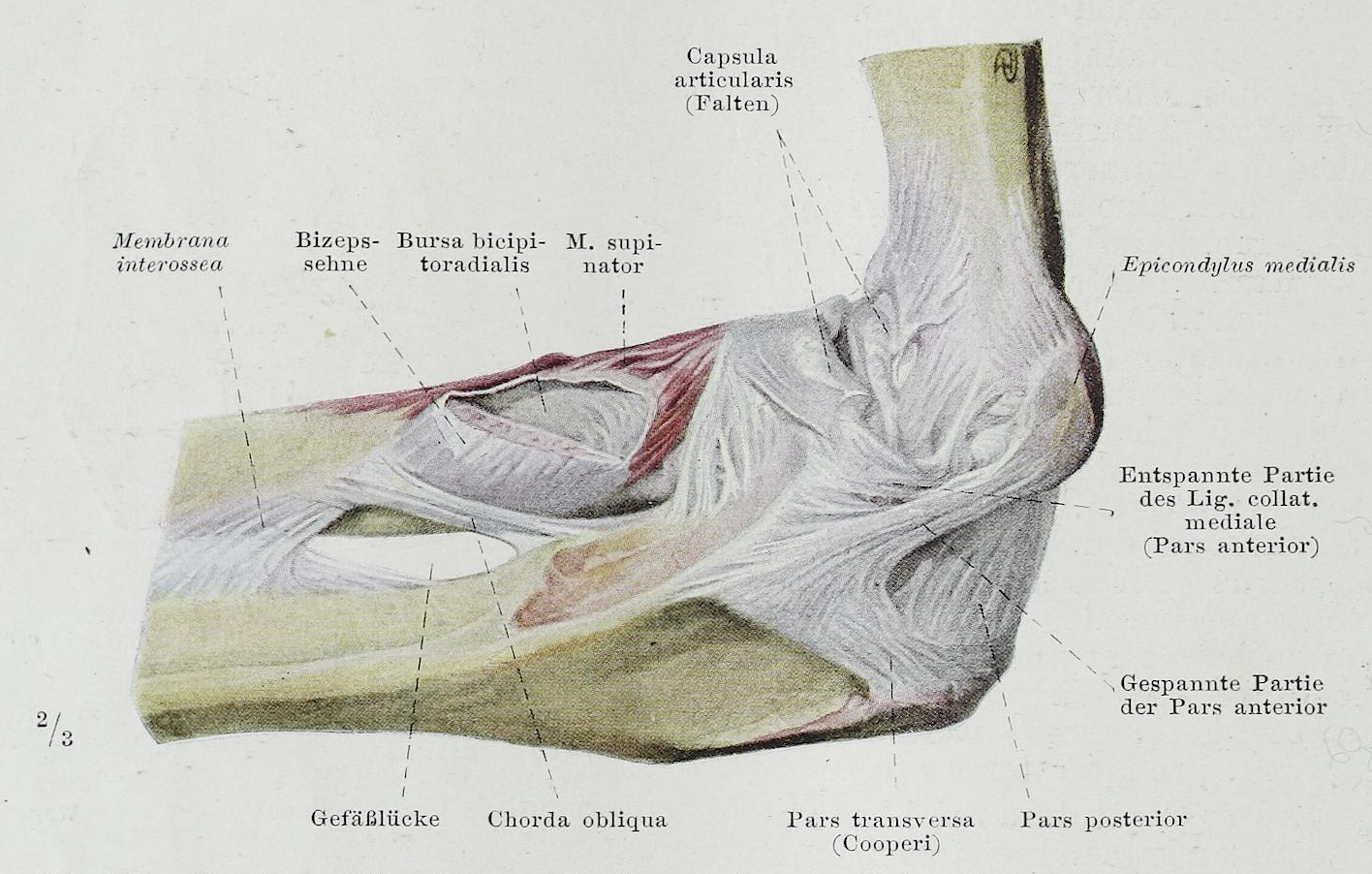
Right cubital joint seen from the medial site.

The bicipitoradial bursa is a bursa located between the distal tendon of the biceps brachii muscle and the anterior part of the tuberosity of the radius. It partially or completely wraps around the biceps tendon. It ensures frictionless motion between the biceps tendon and the proximal radius during pronation and supination of the forearm. With pronation, the tuberosity of the radius rotates posteriorly, causing compression of the bursa between the biceps tendon and the radial tuberosity.

The bicipitoradial bursa is one of the two bursae in the cubital fossa, the other being the interosseous bursa.

Inflammation of the bicipitoradial bursa or bicipitoradial bursitis is a rare condition and only few reports can be found in literature. In severe cases, the bursa is distended by synovial debris and can cause compression of the posterior interosseous nerve.
