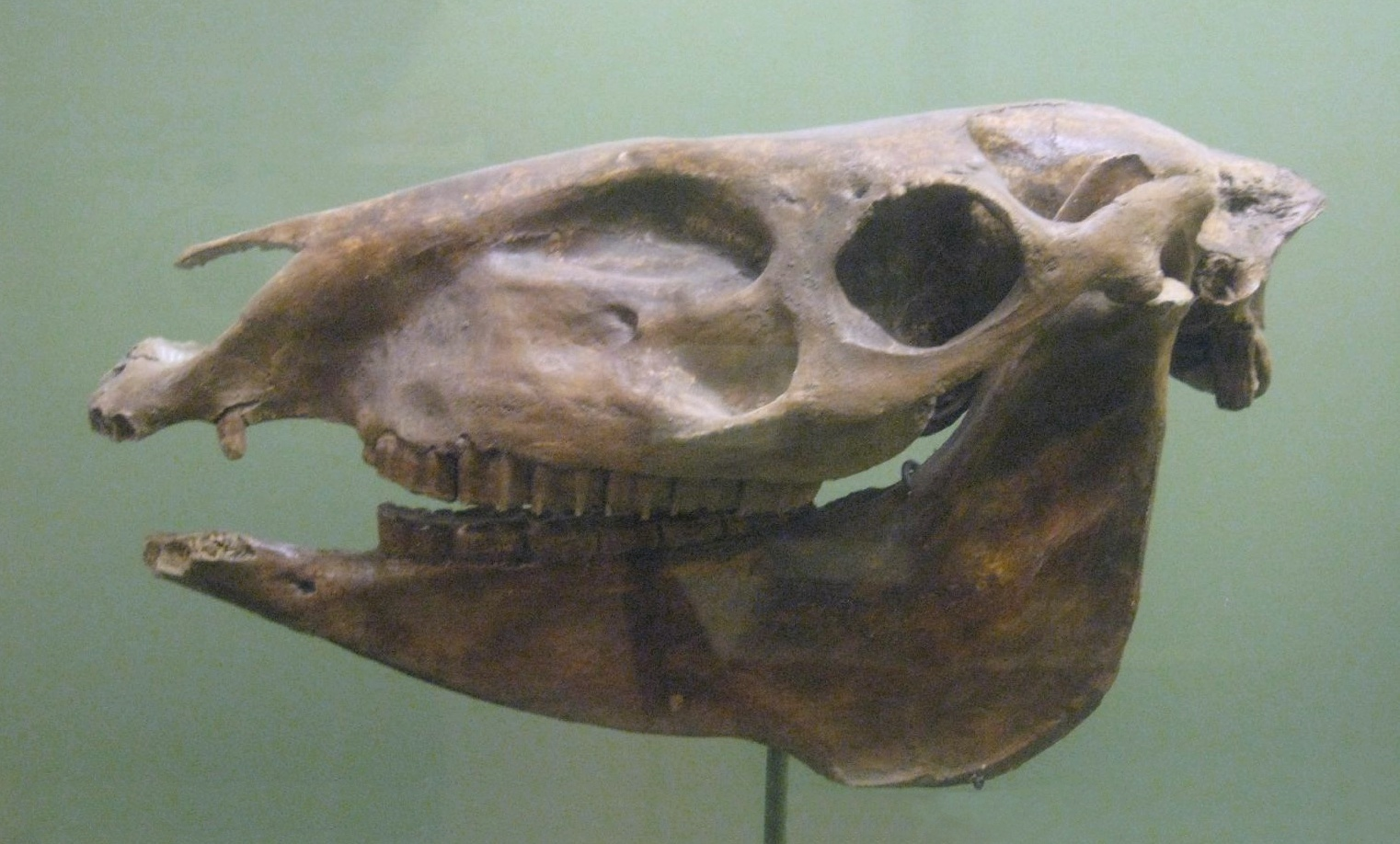
- Pliohippus pernix skull

Scientific classification
- Kingdom: Animalia
- Phylum: Chordata
- Class: Mammalia
- Order: Perissodactyla
- Family: Equidae
- Subfamily: Equinae
- Tribe: Equini
- Genus: †Pliohippus; Marsh, 1874

Species
- P. castilli; P. fossulatus; P. mirabilis; P. nobilis; P. pernix; P. tantalus; P. tehonensis

= Pliohippus =

Pliohippus Temporal range: Barstovian-Hemphillian ~15.97–4.9 Ma

Extinct genus of mammals

Pliohippus (from Ancient Greek πλείων (pleíon), meaning "more", and ἵππος (híppos), meaning "horse") is an extinct genus of Equidae, the horse family. Pliohippus arose in the middle Miocene, around 15 million years ago. The long and slim limbs of Pliohippus reveal a quick-footed steppe animal. While some specimens have one toe per leg, others have three (the main toe and two non-functional side toes).

Because of its many anatomical similarities, Pliohippus was initially believed to be the ancestor of the present-day horse and its relatives in Equus. Although Pliohippus clearly is an equid and thus related to Equus, its skull had deep facial fossae, a feature not found in any member of Equus. Additionally, its teeth were strongly curved, unlike the very straight teeth of modern horses. Consequently, it is unlikely to be the ancestor of the modern horse; instead, it is likely to be the ancestor of Astrohippus. Pliohippus stood approximately 1.25 metres, similar to the modern horse. Also like the modern horse, Pliohippus was a grazer that fed on steppe grasses of the North American plains it inhabited.

Fossils of Pliohippus have been found at many late Miocene localities in Colorado, the Great Plains (Nebraska, including Ashfall Fossil Beds and the Dakotas) and also Canada. Pliohippus has been found beside Neohipparion.

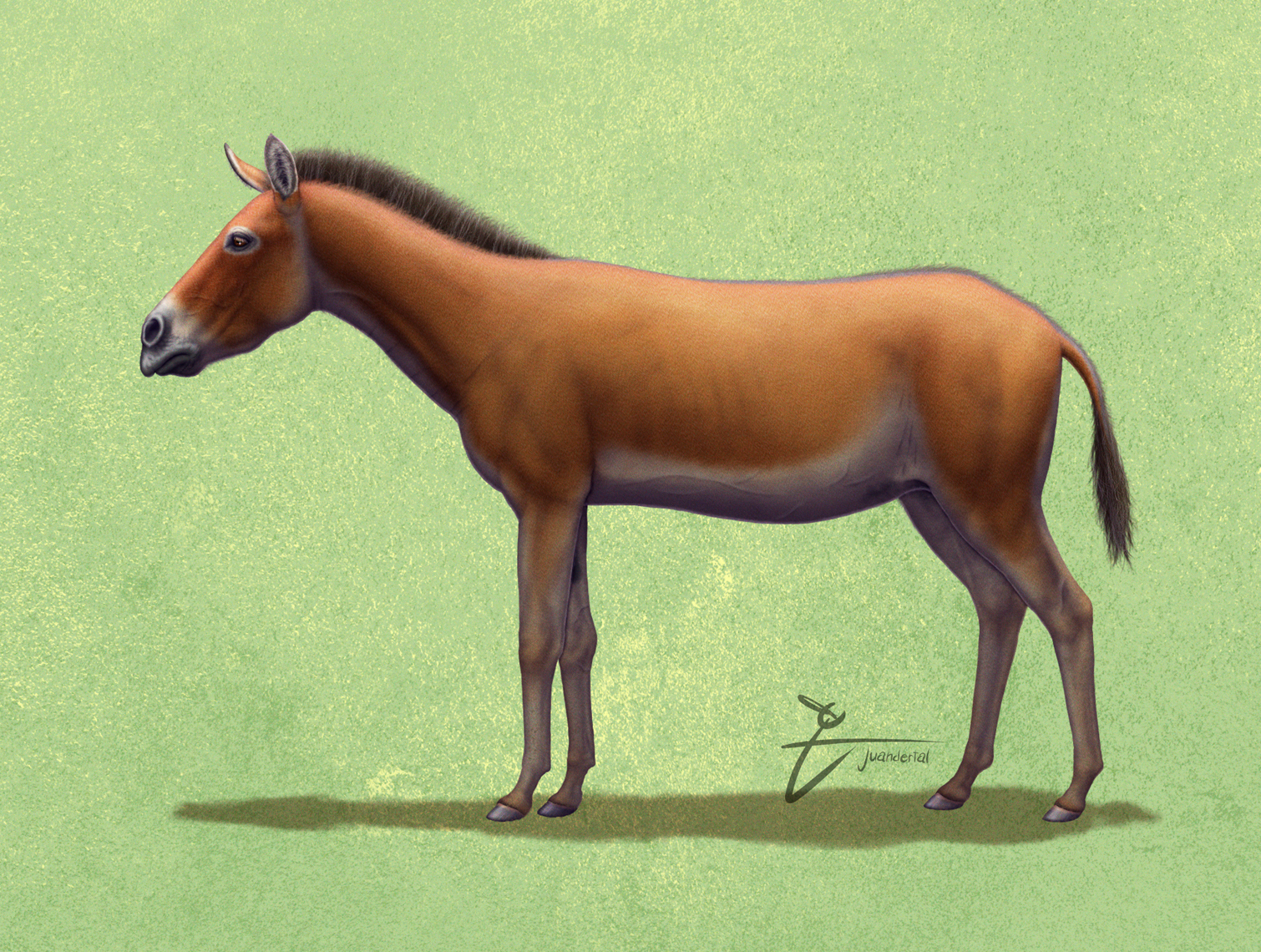
Life reconstruction of P. pernix
