= Biceps =

Muscle on the front of the upper arm

Biceps brachii
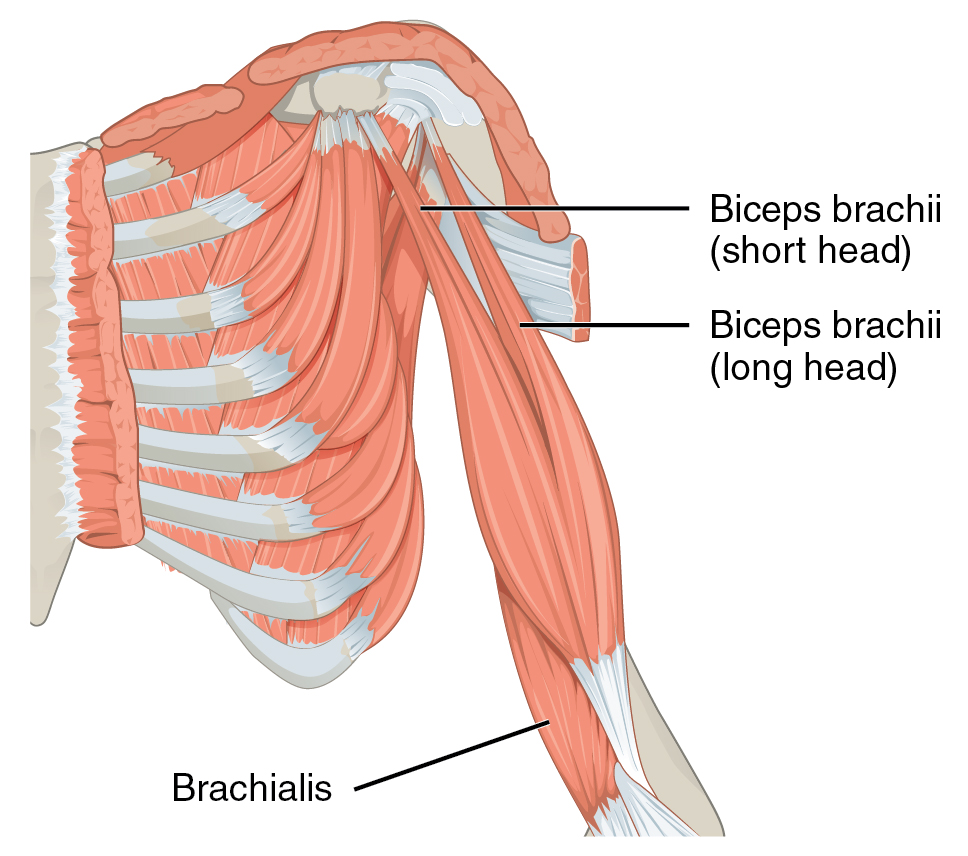
- The biceps is a two-headed muscle and is one of the chief flexors of the forearm. Here is the left side, seen from the front.

Details
- Pronunciation: /ˈbaɪsɛps ˈbreɪkiaɪ/
- Origin: Short head: coracoid process of the scapula. Long head: supraglenoid tubercle
- Insertion: Radial tuberosity and bicipital aponeurosis into deep fascia on medial part of forearm
- Artery: Brachial artery
- Nerve: Musculocutaneous nerve (C5–C7)
- Actions: Flexes elbow; flexes and abducts shoulder; supinates radioulnar joint in the forearm
- Antagonist: Triceps brachii muscle

Identifiers
- Latin: musculus biceps brachii
- TA98: A04.6.02.013
- TA2: 2464

The biceps or biceps brachii (Latin: musculus biceps brachii, "two-headed muscle of the arm") is a large muscle that lies on the front of the upper arm between the shoulder and the elbow. Both heads of the muscle arise on the scapula and join to form a single muscle belly which is attached to the upper forearm. While the long head of the biceps crosses both the shoulder and elbow joints, its main function is at the elbow where it flexes and supinates the forearm.

== Structure ==
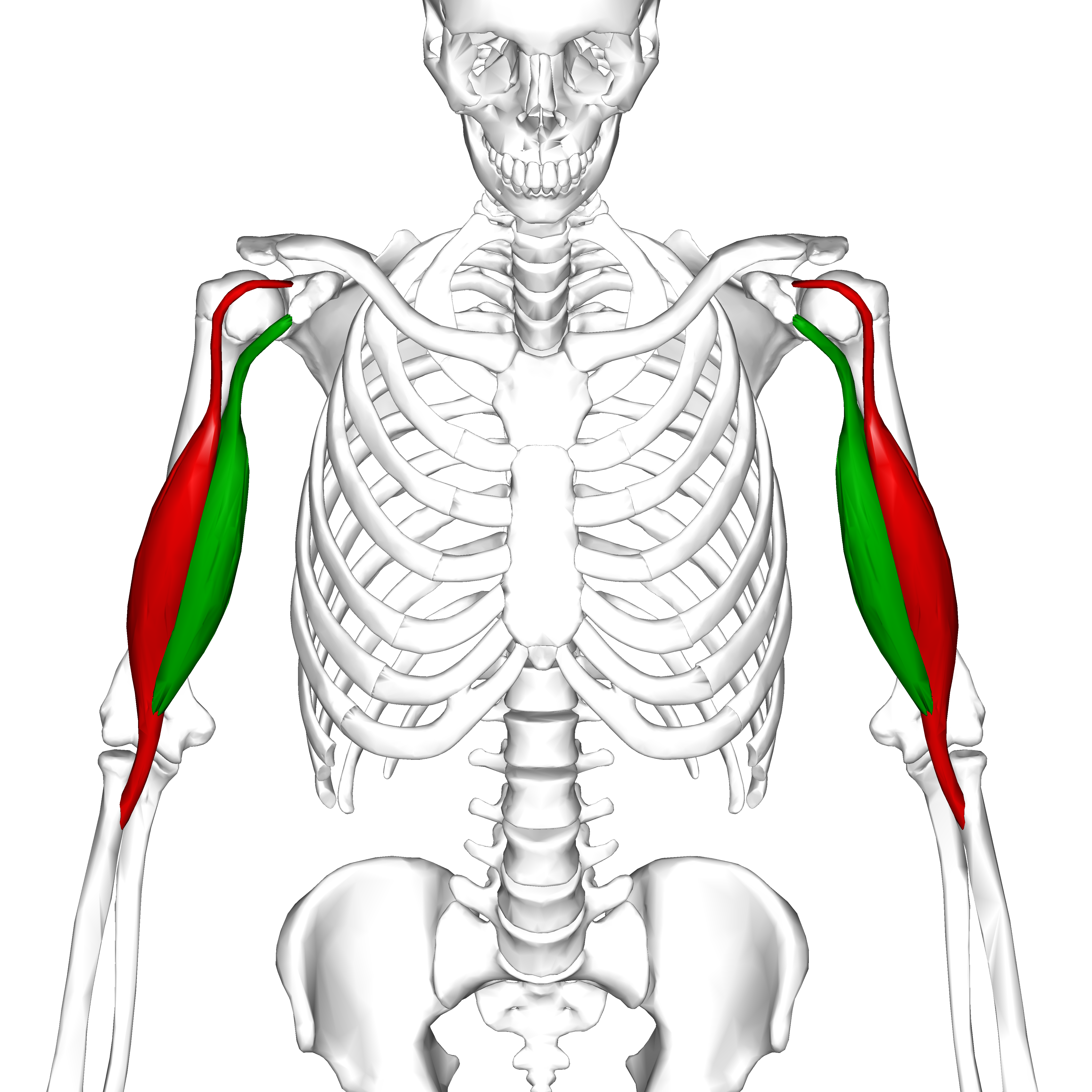
Location of biceps. Two different colors represent two different bundles which compose biceps. Short head Long head

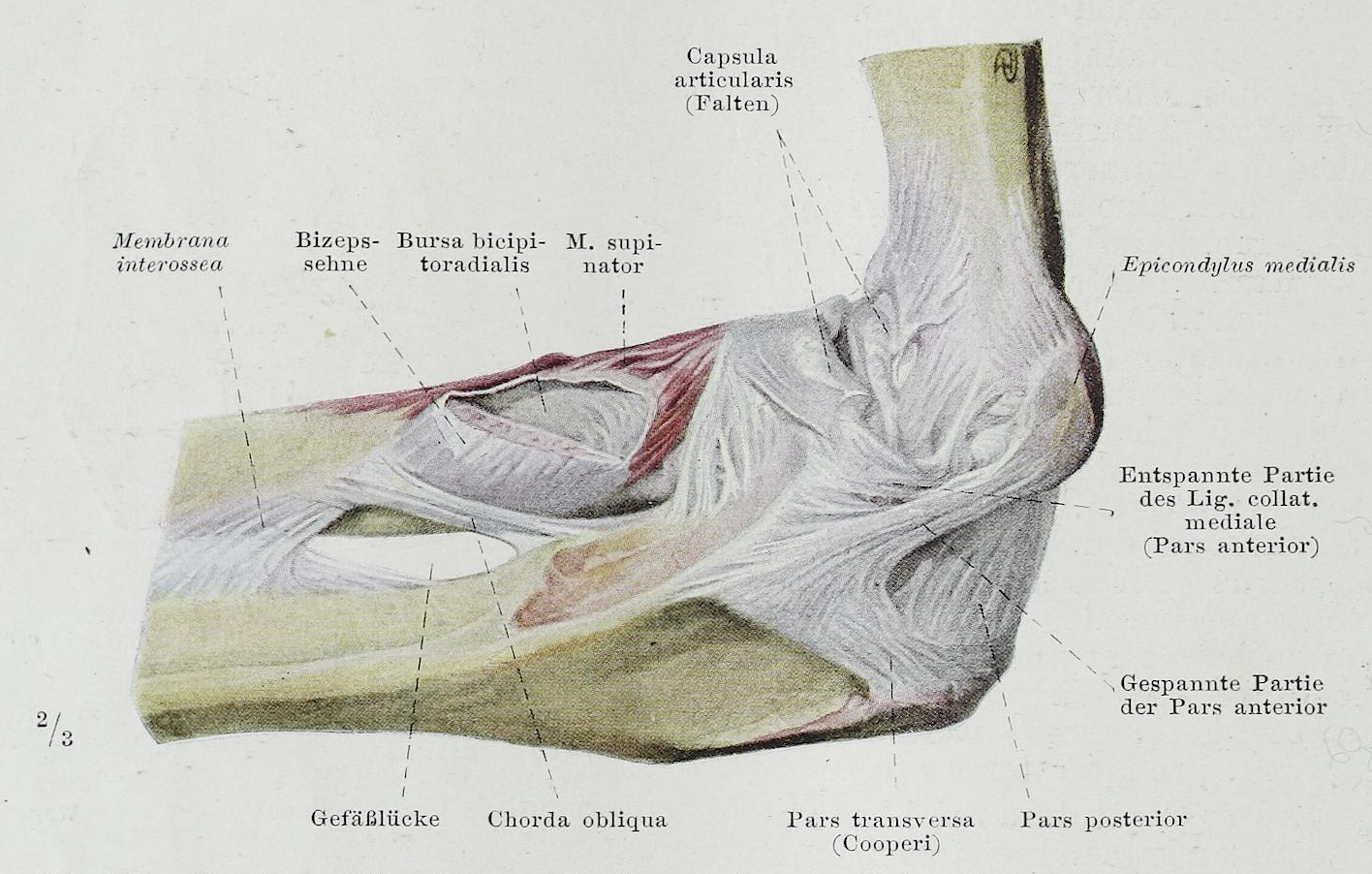
Attachment to the radial tuberosity and Bursa bicipitoradialis.

The biceps is one of three muscles in the anterior compartment of the upper arm, along with the brachialis muscle and the coracobrachialis muscle, with whom the biceps shares a nerve supply. The biceps muscle has two heads, the short head and the long head, distinguished according to their origin at the coracoid process and supraglenoid tubercle of the scapula, respectively. From its origin on the glenoid, the long head remains tendinous as it passes through the shoulder joint and through the intertubercular groove of the humerus. Extending from its origin on the coracoid, the tendon of the short head runs adjacent to the tendon of the coracobrachialis. Unlike the other muscles in the anterior compartment of the arm, the long head of the biceps muscle crosses two joints, the shoulder joint and the elbow joint.

Both heads of the biceps join in the middle upper arm to form a single muscle mass, usually near the insertion of the deltoid, to form a common muscle belly; although several anatomic studies have demonstrated that the muscle bellies remain distinct structures without confluent fibers. As the muscle extends distally, the two heads rotate 90 degrees externally before inserting onto the radial tuberosity. The short head inserts distally on the tuberosity while the long head inserts proximally closer to the apex of the tuberosity. The bicipital aponeurosis, also called the lacertus fibrosus, is a thick fascial band that organizes close to the musculotendinous junction of the biceps and radiates over and inserts onto the ulnar part of the antebrachial fascia.

The tendon that attaches to the radial tuberosity is partially or completely surrounded by a bursa, the bicipitoradial bursa, which ensures frictionless motion between the biceps tendon and the proximal radius during pronation and supination of the forearm.

Two muscles lie underneath the biceps brachii. These are the coracobrachialis muscle, which like the biceps originates from the coracoid process of the scapula, and the brachialis muscle which connects to the ulna and along the mid-shaft of the humerus. Besides those, the brachioradialis muscle is adjacent to the biceps and also inserts on the radius bone, though more distally.

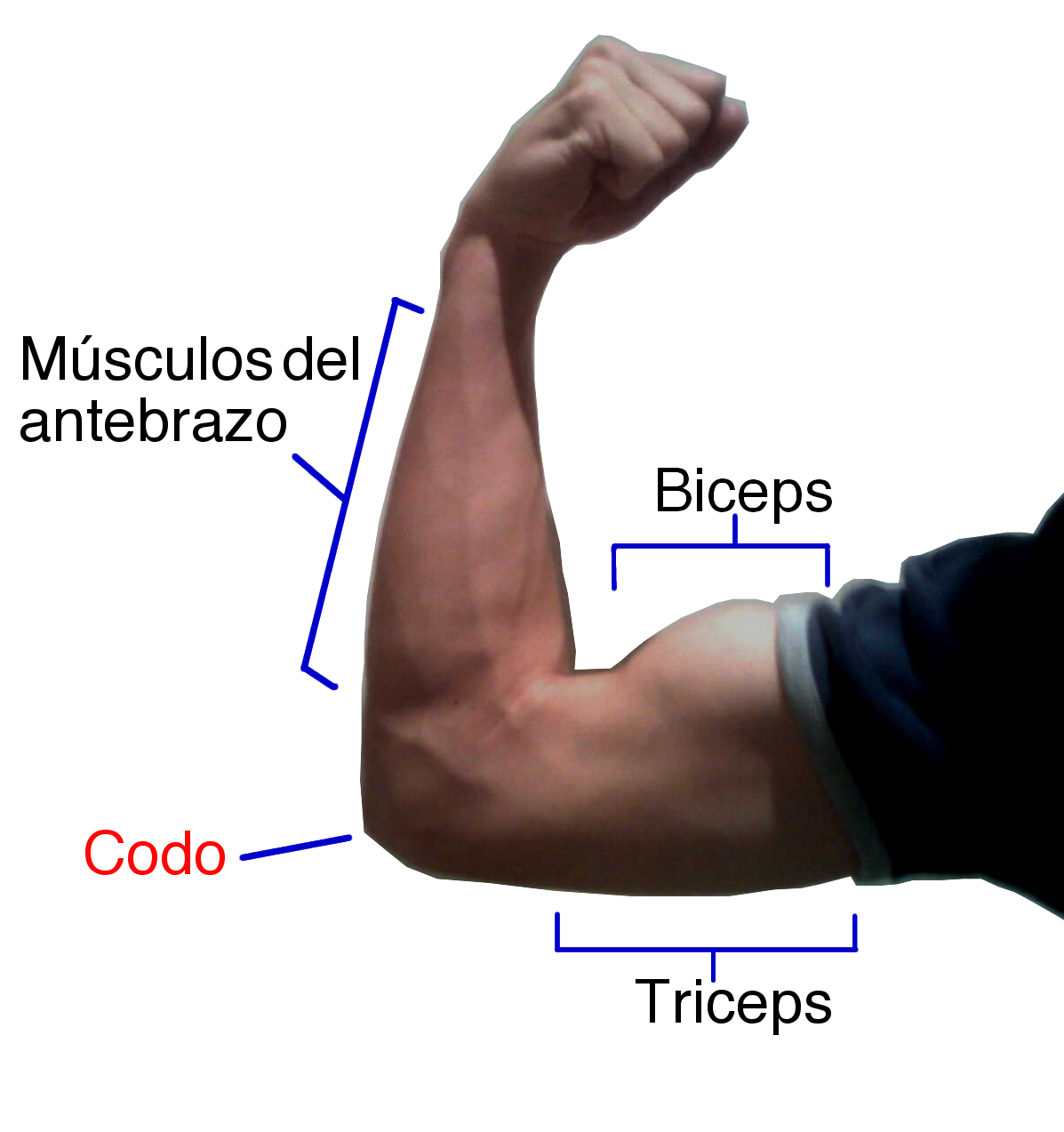
Biceps and triceps.

Movement of biceps and triceps when arm is flexing

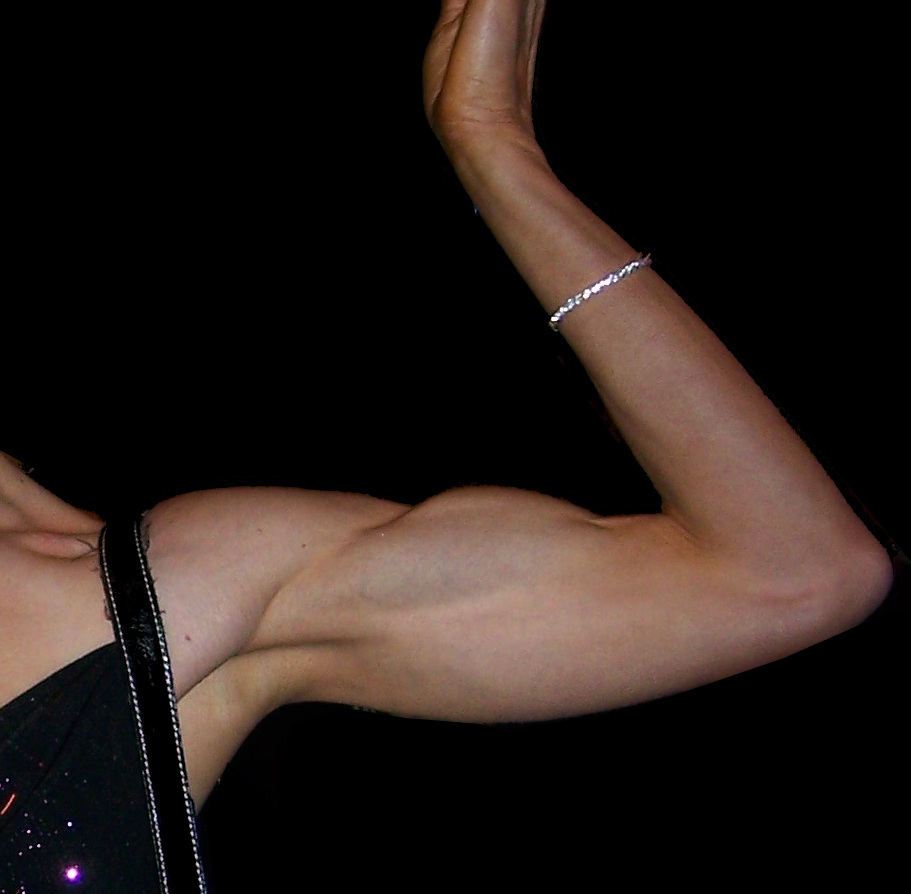
The split line between the long and short heads

=== Variation ===
Traditionally described as a two-headed muscle, biceps brachii is one of the most variable muscles of the human body and has a third head arising from the humerus in 10% of cases (normal variation)—most commonly originating near the insertion of the coracobrachialis and joining the short head—but four, five, and even seven supernumerary heads have been reported in rare cases.

One study found a higher than expected number of female cadavers with a third head of biceps brachii, equal incidence between sides of the body, and uniform innervation by musculocutaneous nerve.

The distal biceps tendons are completely separated in 40% and bifurcated in 25% of cases.

=== Nerve supply ===
The biceps shares its nerve supply with the other two muscles of the anterior compartment. The muscles are supplied by the musculocutaneous nerve. Fibers of the fifth, sixth and seventh cervical nerves make up the components of the musculocutaneous nerve which supply the biceps.

=== Blood supply ===
The blood supply of the biceps is the brachial artery. The distal tendon of the biceps can be useful for palpating the brachial pulse, as the artery runs medial to the tendon in the cubital fossa.

== Function ==
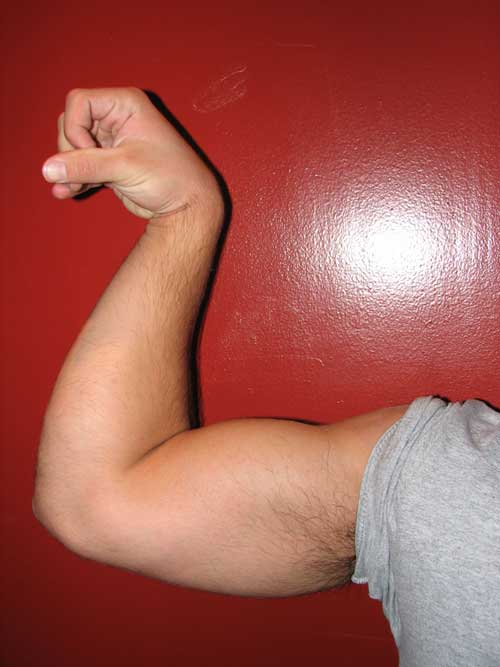
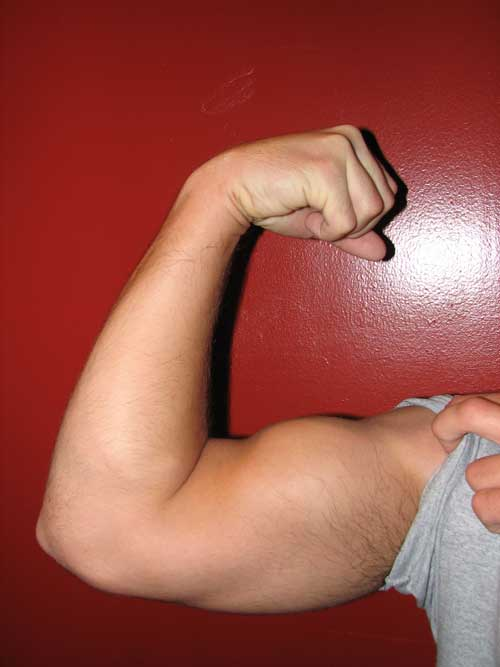
Flexed arm in the pronated position (left); with the biceps partially contracted and in a supinated position with the biceps more fully contracted, approaching minimum length (right.)

The biceps works across three joints. The most important of these functions is to supinate the forearm and flex the elbow. Besides, the long head of biceps prevents the upward displacement of the head of the humerus. In more detail, the actions are, by joint:

- Proximal radioulnar joint of the elbow – The biceps brachii functions as a powerful supinator of the forearm, i.e. it turns the palm upwards. This action, which is aided by the supinator muscle, requires the humeroulnar joint of the elbow to be at least partially flexed. If the humeroulnar joint is fully extended, supination is then primarily carried out by the supinator muscle. The biceps is a particularly powerful supinator of the forearm due to the distal attachment of the muscle at the radial tuberosity, on the opposite side of the bone from the supinator muscle. When flexed, the biceps effectively pulls the radius back into its neutral supinated position in concert with the supinator muscle.
- Humeroulnar joint of the elbow – The biceps brachii also functions as an important flexor of the forearm, particularly when the forearm is supinated. Functionally, this action is performed when lifting an object, such as a bag of groceries or when performing a biceps curl. When the forearm is in pronation (the palm faces the ground), the brachialis, brachioradialis, and supinator function to flex the forearm, with minimal contribution from the biceps brachii. Regardless of forearm position, (supinated, pronated, or neutral) the force exerted by the biceps brachii remains the same; however, the brachioradialis has a much greater change in exertion depending on position than the biceps during concentric contractions. That is, the biceps can only exert so much force, and as forearm position changes, other muscles must compensate.
- Glenohumeral joint (shoulder joint) – Several weaker functions occur at the glenohumeral joint. The biceps brachii weakly assists in forward flexion of the shoulder joint (bringing the arm forward and upwards). It may also contribute to abduction (bringing the arm out to the side) when the arm is externally (or laterally) rotated. The short head of the biceps brachii also assists with horizontal adduction (bringing the arm across the body) when the arm is internally (or medially) rotated. Finally, the short head of the biceps brachii, due to its attachment to the scapula (or shoulder blade), assists with stabilization of the shoulder joint when a heavy weight is carried in the arm. The tendon of the long head of the biceps also assists in holding the head of the humerus in the glenoid cavity and prevents an impingement of the supraspinatus tendon.

Motor units in the lateral portion of the long head of the biceps are preferentially activated during elbow flexion, while motor units in the medial portion are preferentially activated during forearm supination.

The biceps are usually attributed as representative of strength within a variety of worldwide cultures.

== Clinical significance ==
The proximal tendons of the biceps brachii are commonly involved in pathological processes and are a frequent cause of anterior shoulder pain. Disorders of the distal biceps brachii tendon include insertional tendonitis and partial or complete tears of the tendon. Partial tears are usually characterized by pain and enlargement and abnormal contour of the tendon. Complete tears occur as avulsion of the tendinous portion of the biceps away from its insertion on the tuberosity of the radius, and is often accompanied by a palpable, audible "pop" and immediate pain and soft tissue swelling.

A soft-tissue mass is sometimes encountered in the anterior aspect of the arm, the so-called reverse Popeye deformity, which paradoxically leads to a decreased strength during flexion of the elbow and supination of the forearm.

=== Tendon rupture ===
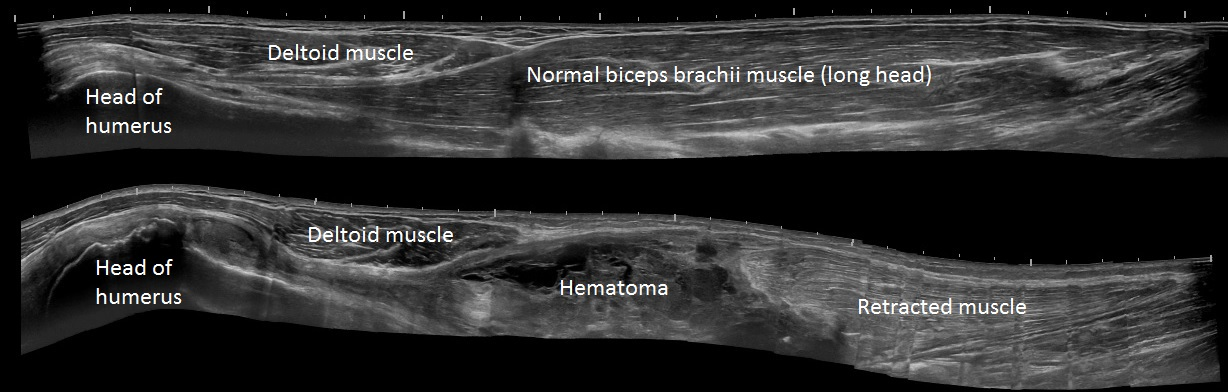
Panoramic ultrasonography of a proximal biceps tendon rupture. Top image shows the contralateral normal side, and lower image shows a retracted muscle, with a hematoma filling out the proximal space.

Tears of the biceps brachii may occur during athletic activities, however avulsion injuries of the distal biceps tendon are frequently occupational in nature and sustained during forceful, eccentric contraction of the biceps muscle while lifting.

Treatment of a biceps tear depends on the severity of the injury. In most cases, the muscle will heal over time with no corrective surgery. Applying cold pressure and using anti-inflammatory medications will ease pain and reduce swelling. More severe injuries require surgery and post-op physical therapy to regain strength and functionality in the muscle. Corrective surgeries of this nature are typically reserved for elite athletes who rely on a complete recovery.

=== Training ===
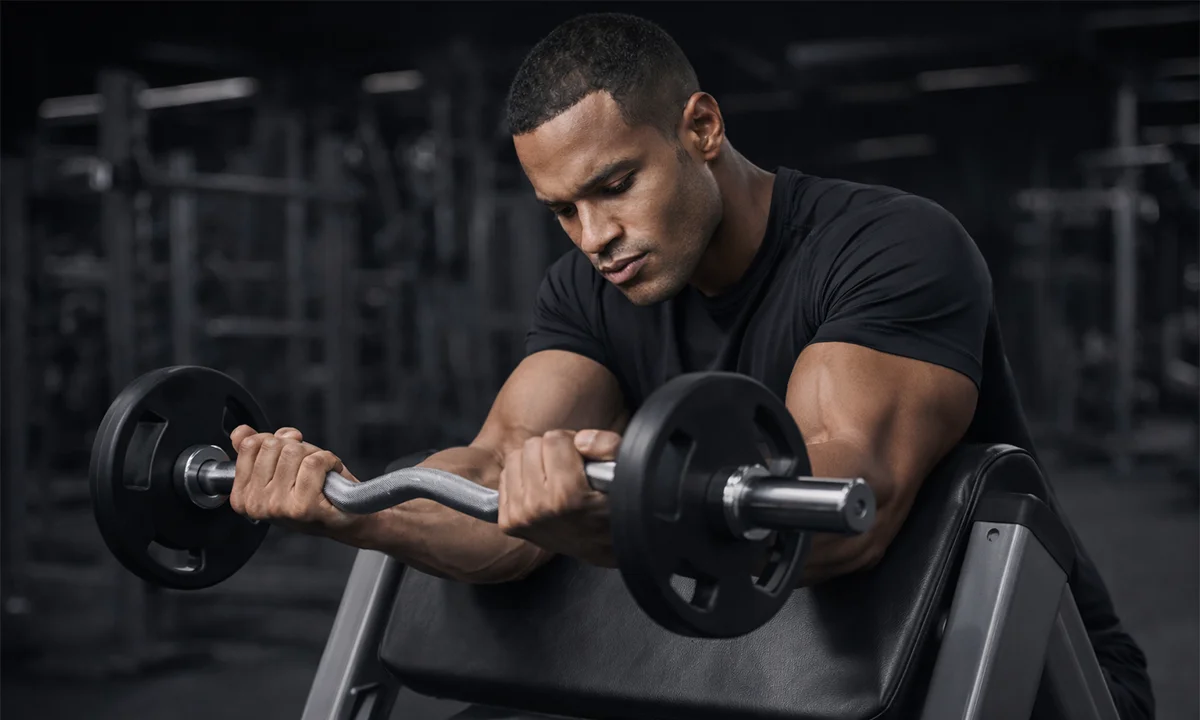
Biceps curl

The biceps can be strengthened using weight and resistance training. Examples of well known biceps exercises are the chin-up and biceps curl. The majority of weightlifters separate bicep exercises into two categories: exercises which focus on the short-head of the biceps brachii and those which work the long-head. Bicep curls, barbell curls, and concentration curls primarily focus on the short-head of the biceps brachii, while dumbbell waiter curls and close-grip barbell curls work the long-head of the biceps. In addition to these, weightlifters include exercises for the brachialis muscle, such as hammer curls, to increase the size of the upper arm.

== Etymology and grammar ==
The term biceps brachii is a Latin phrase meaning "two-headed [muscle] of the arm", in reference to the fact that the muscle consists of two bundles of muscle, each with its own origin, sharing a common insertion point near the elbow joint. The proper plural form of the Latin adjective biceps is bicipites, a form not in general English use. Instead, biceps is used in both singular and plural (i.e., when referring to both arms).

The English form bicep, attested from 1939, is a back formation derived from misinterpreting the s of biceps as the English plural marker -s.

Adriaan van den Spiegel called the biceps a Pisciculus due to its fusiform shape, which is why in the Italian-language medical literature it is sometimes called il pescetto, "the small fish".

== History ==
Leonardo da Vinci expressed the original idea of the biceps acting as a supinator in a series of annotated drawings made between 1505 and 1510; in which the principle of the biceps as a supinator, as well as its role as a flexor to the elbow were devised. However, this function remained undiscovered by the medical community as da Vinci was not regarded as a teacher of anatomy, nor were his results publicly released. It was not until 1713 that this movement was re-discovered by William Cheselden and subsequently recorded for the medical community. It was rewritten several times by different authors wishing to present information to different audiences. The most notable recent expansion upon Cheselden's recordings was written by Guillaume Duchenne in 1867, in a journal named Physiology of Motion. It remains one of the major references on supination action of the biceps brachii.

== Other species ==
=== Neanderthals ===
In Neanderthals, the radial bicipital tuberosities were larger than in modern humans, which suggests they were probably able to use their biceps for supination over a wider range of pronation-supination. It is possible that they relied more on their biceps for forceful supination without the assistance of the supinator muscle like in modern humans, and thus that they used a different movement when throwing.

=== Horses ===
In the horse, the biceps' function is to extend the shoulder and flex the elbow. It is composed of two short-fibred heads separated longitudinally by a thick internal tendon which stretches from the origin on the supraglenoid tubercle to the insertion on the medial radial tuberosity. This tendon can withstand very large forces when the biceps is stretched. From this internal tendon a strip of tendon, the lacertus fibrosus, connects the muscle with the extensor carpi radialis -- an important feature in the horse's stay apparatus (through which the horse can rest and sleep whilst standing.)
