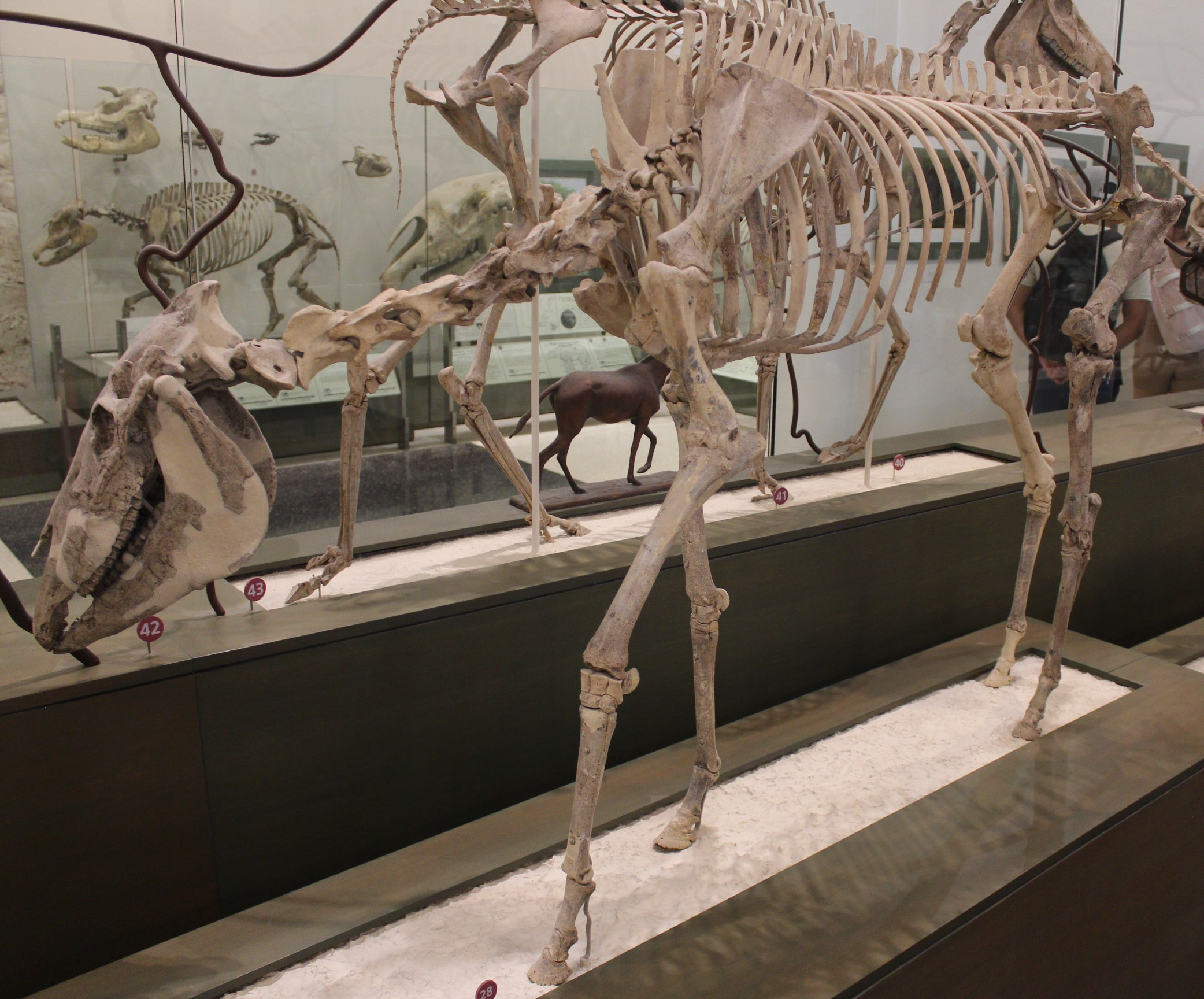
- Holotype skeleton of Dinohippus leidyanus (AMNH 17224)

Scientific classification
- Kingdom: Animalia
- Phylum: Chordata
- Class: Mammalia
- Order: Perissodactyla
- Family: Equidae
- Subfamily: Equinae
- Tribe: Equini
- Genus: †Dinohippus; Quinn, 1955

Type species
- †Pliohippus leidyanus

Species
- †D. edensis Frick, 1924; †D. interpolatus Cope, 1893; †D. leardi Drescher, 1941; †D. leidyanus Osborn, 1918; †D. mexicanus Lance, 1950; †D. osborni Frick, 1924; †D. pachyops Cope, 1893; †D. subvenus Quinn, 1955

= Dinohippus =

Dinohippus Temporal range: Middle Miocene-Late Pliocene (Hemphillian-Blancan) ~10.3–3.6 Ma

Extinct genus of mammals

Dinohippus (from Ancient Greek δεινός (deinós), meaning "terrible", and ἵππος (híppos), meaning "horse") is an extinct equid which was endemic to North America from the late Hemphillian stage of the Miocene through the Zanclean stage of the Pliocene (10.3—3.6 mya) and in existence for approximately 6.7 million years. Fossils are widespread throughout North America, being found at more than 30 sites from Florida to Alberta and from Mexico all the way down to Panama (Alajuela Formation). The majority of fossils of Dinohippus have been unearthed in the Western United States in Nevada, New Mexico, Utah, and California.

== Taxonomy ==
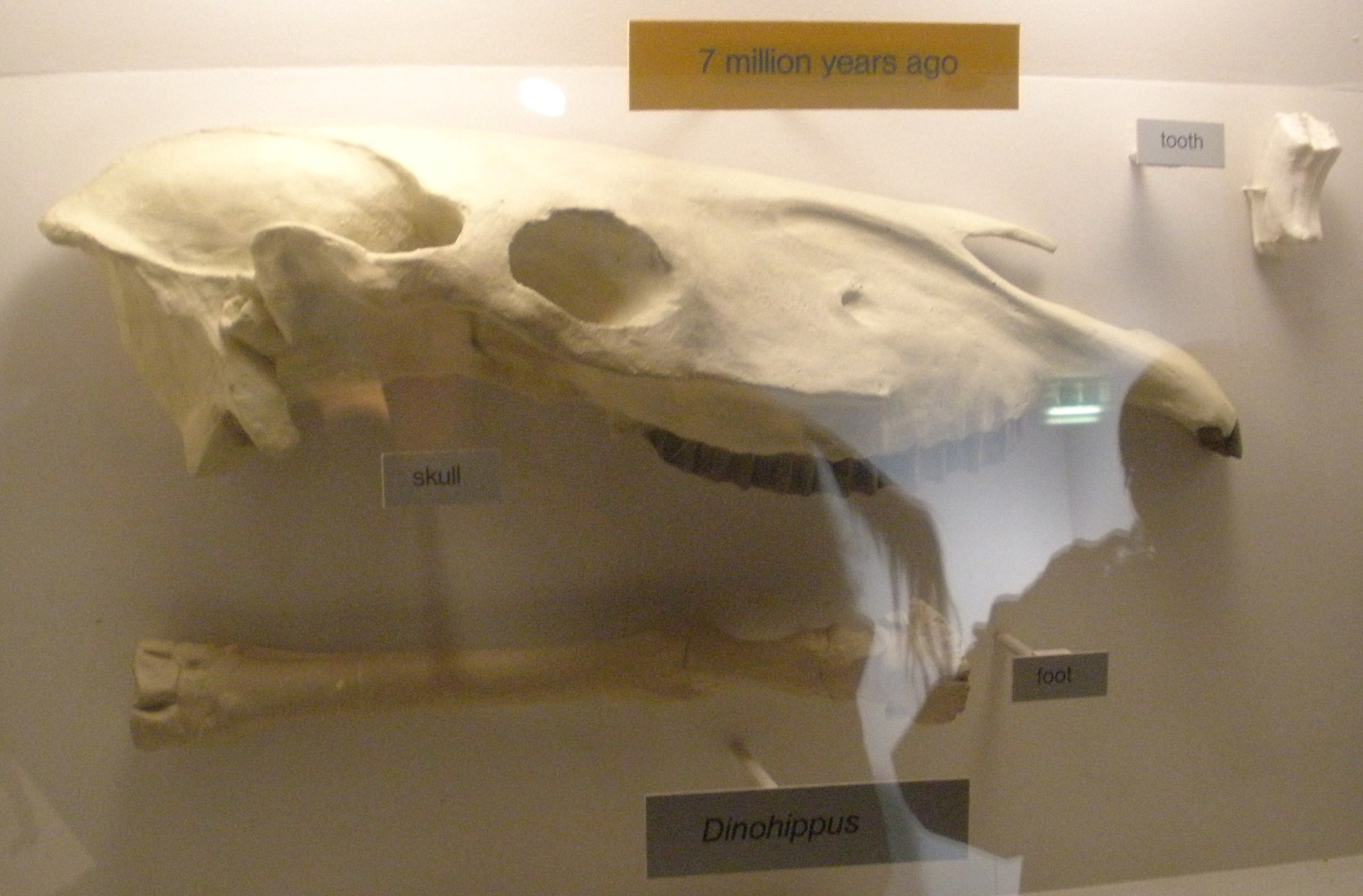
Skull

Quinn originally referred "Pliohippus" mexicanus to Dinohippus, but unpublished cladistic results in an SVP 2018 conference abstract suggest that mexicanus is instead more closely related to extant horses than to Dinohippus.

== Description ==
Dinohippus was the most common horse in North America and like Equus, it did not have a dished face (i.e. the head profile did not have a concave section). It has a distinctive passive "stay apparatus" formed from bones and tendons to help it conserve energy while standing for long periods. Dinohippus was the first horse to show a rudimentary form of this character, providing additional evidence of the close relationship between Dinohippus and Equus. Dinohippus was originally thought to be a monodactyl horse, but a 1981 fossil find in Nebraska shows that some were tridactyl. The species D. leidyanus had an estimated body mass of approximately 200 kilograms (440 lb).

== Diet ==
D. mexicanus fed primarily on C_{3} plants in rainforest clearings based on paired carbon and oxygen isotope analysis.

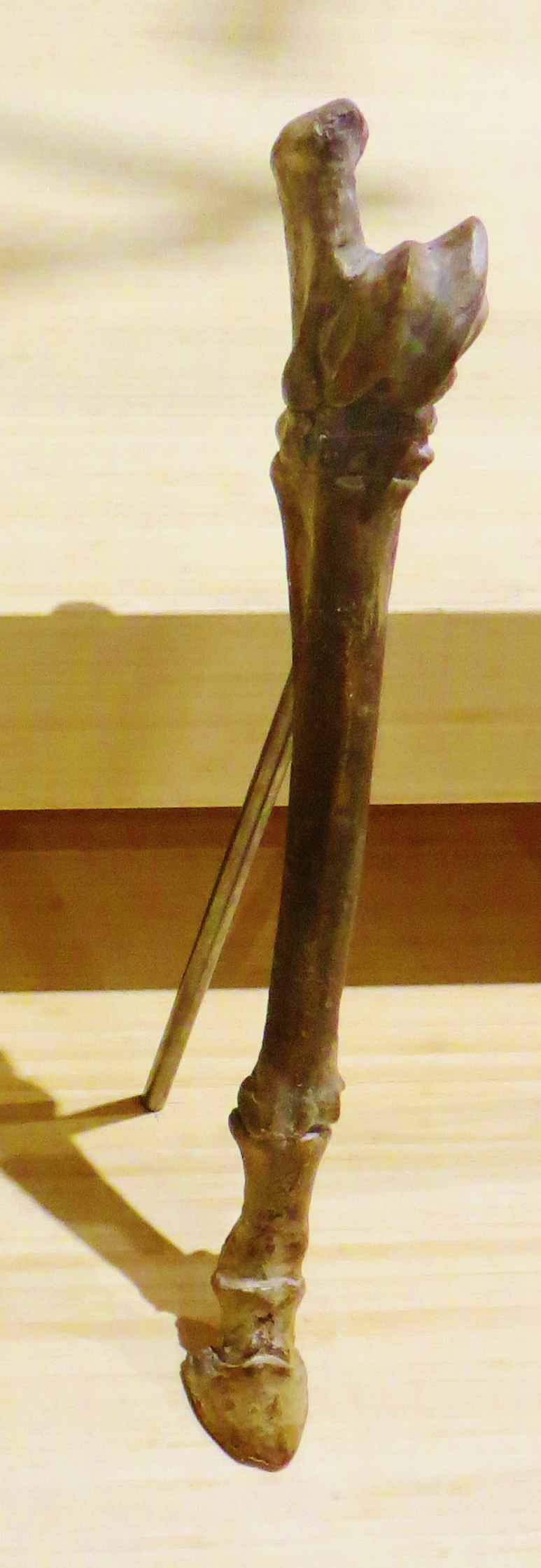
Foot bones

At the Optima site in Oklahoma, dating to the Messinian, D. interpolatus had a greater proportion of light carbon isotopes in its tooth enamel than the other equid taxa but still a significantly smaller one than any of the other herbivore taxa. This suggests that it had a diet rich in C_{4} plants but that it was not as heavily specialised as its contemporary equids. It also had dental mesowear indicative of a more mixed diet than the other equids.
