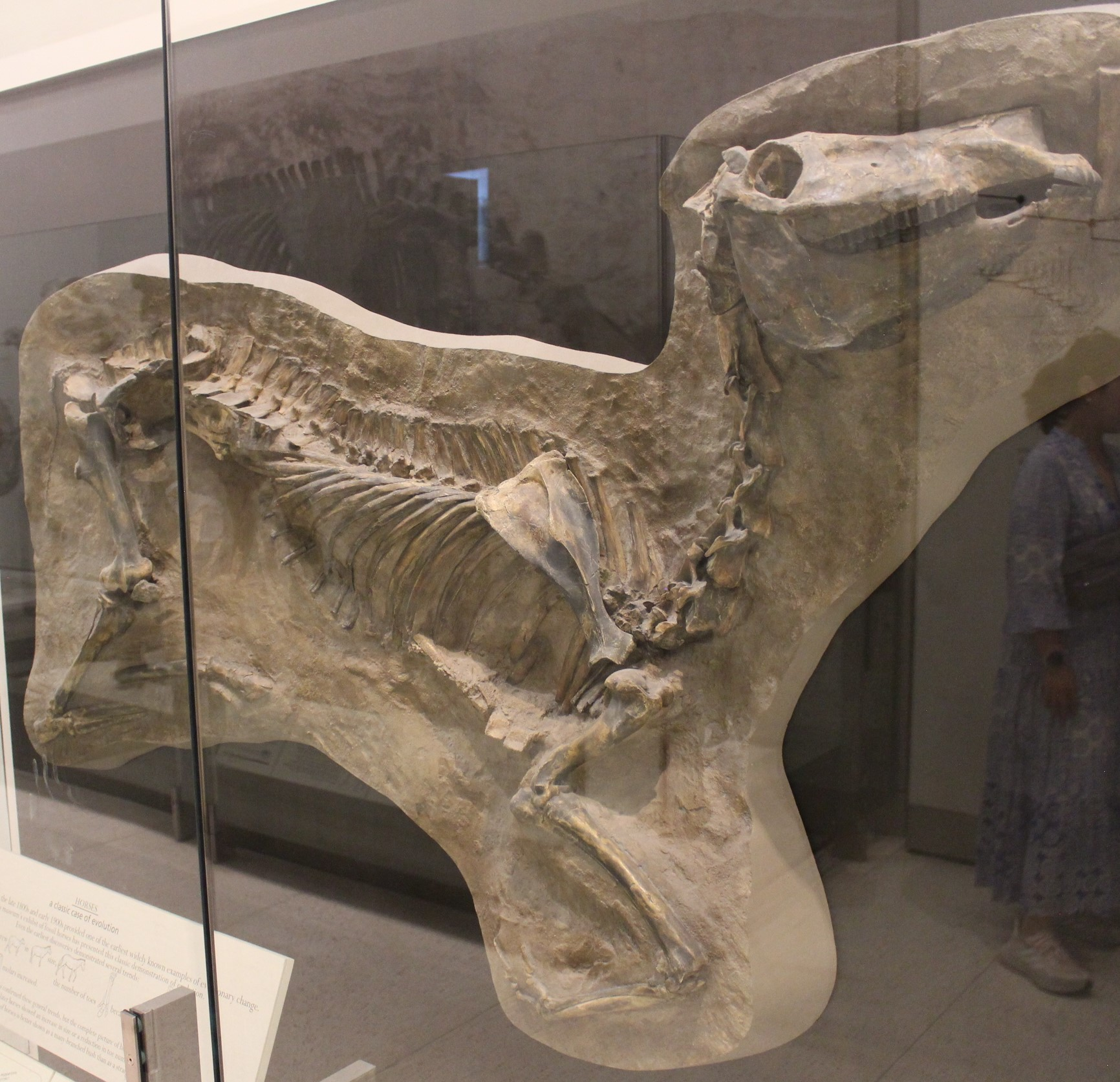
- Protohippus simus skeleton

Scientific classification
- Kingdom: Animalia
- Phylum: Chordata
- Class: Mammalia
- Order: Perissodactyla
- Family: Equidae
- Subfamily: Equinae
- Genus: †Protohippus; Leidy, 1858

Type species
- Equus (Protohippus) perditus Leidy, 1858

= Protohippus =

Protohippus Temporal range: Clarendonian-Hemphillian ~13.6–5.3 Ma

Extinct genus of mammals

Protohippus is an extinct three-toed genus of horse. It was roughly the size of a modern donkey. Fossil evidence suggests that it lived during the Late Miocene (Clarendonian to Hemphillian), from about 13.6 Ma to 5.3 Ma.

Analysis of Protohippus' skull and teeth suggests that it is most closely related to the genus Calippus.

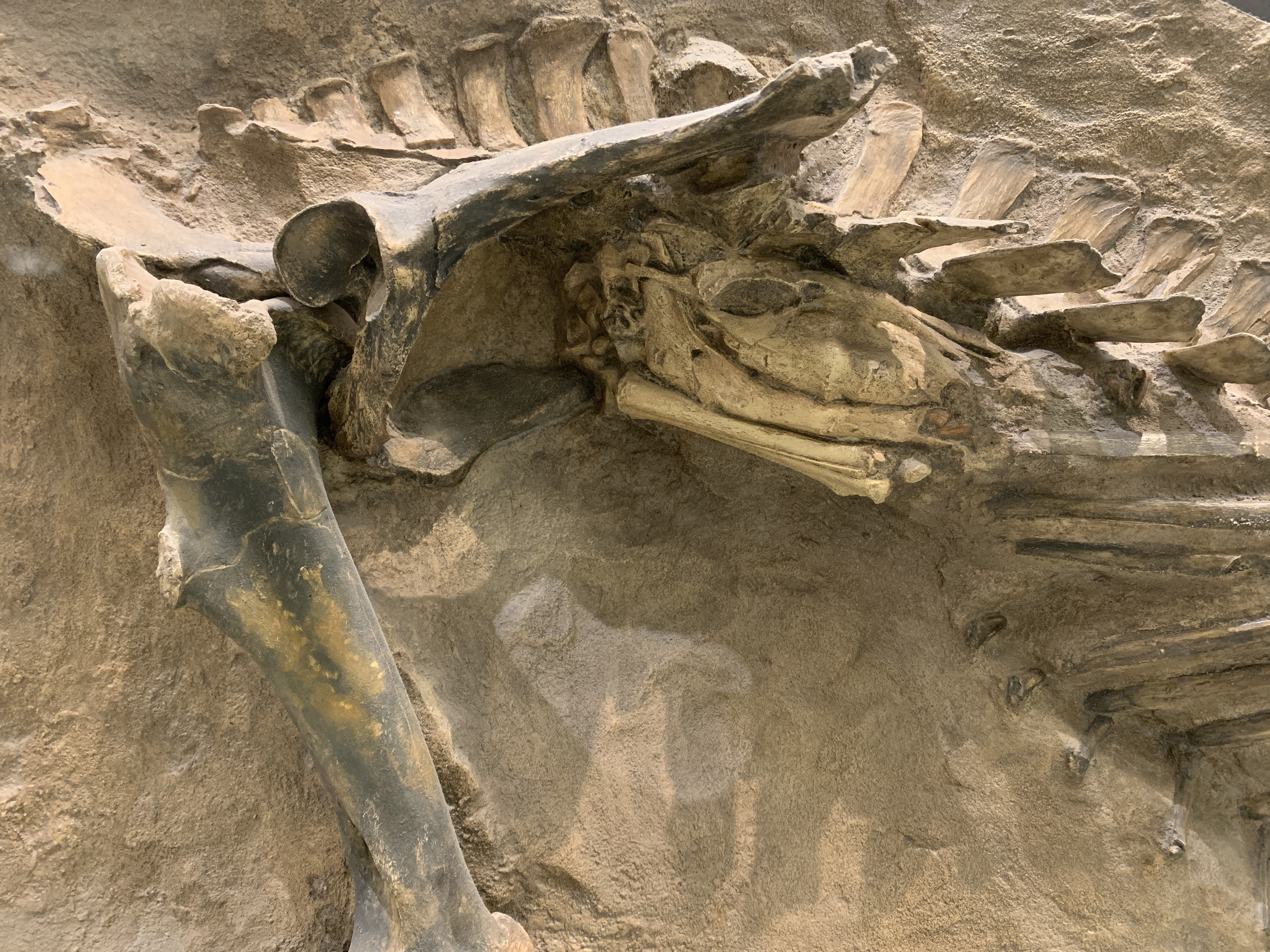
Fetus

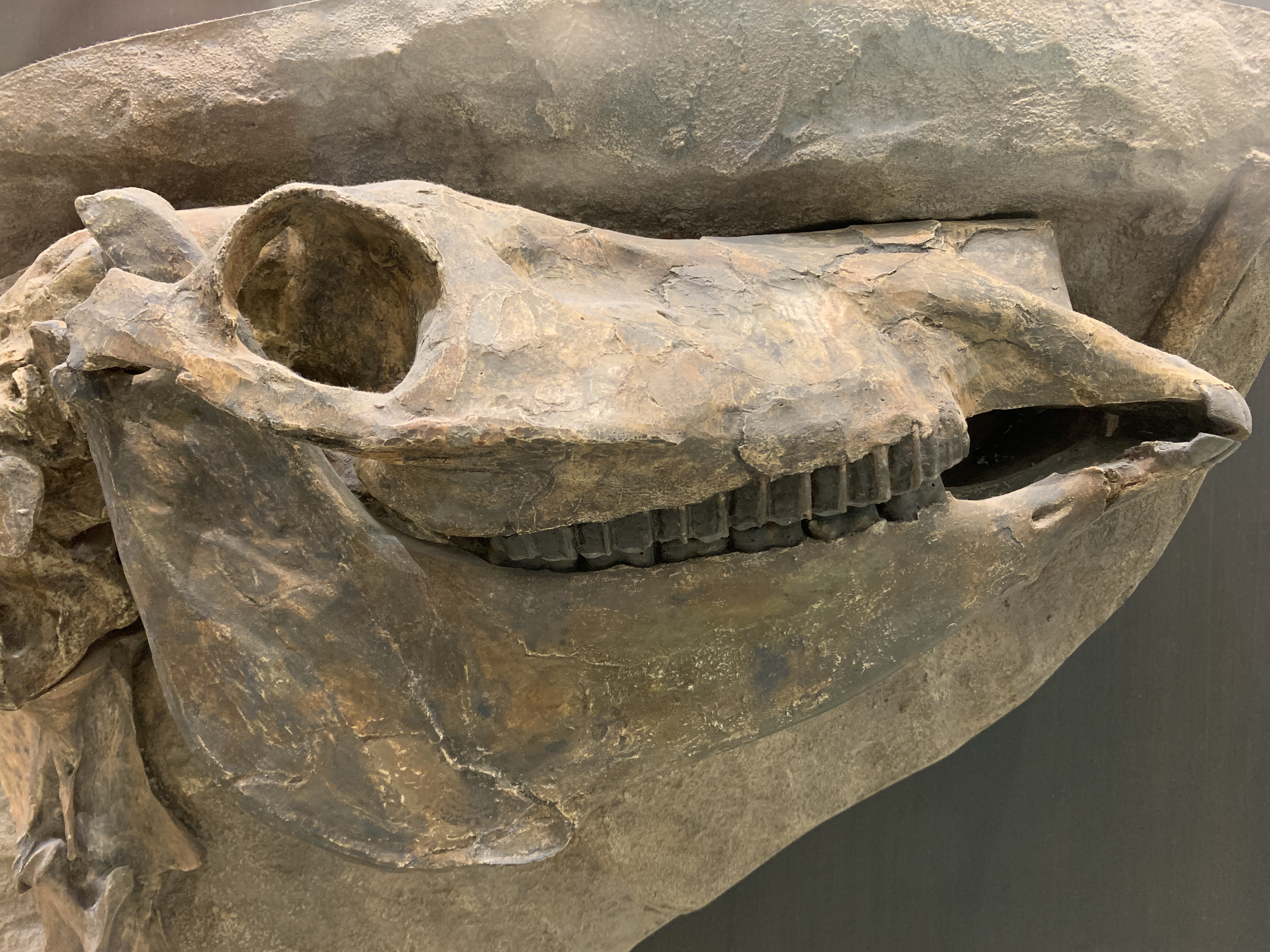
Skull

P. simus. This animal died from a breech birth, where the hind feet instead of the head of the foal emerges first. As the foal did not fully emerge, infection may have ensued, killing the mother. From Cherry County, Nebraska. At the AMNH.

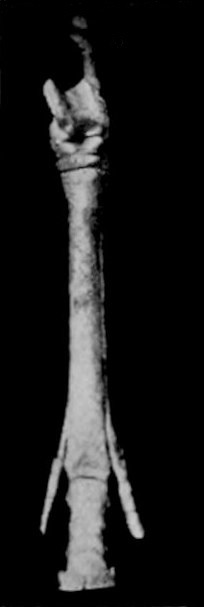
Protohippus foot.

== Species ==
- P. vetus
- P. perditus
- P. supremus (also P. simus)
- P. gidleyi

== See also ==
- Eohippus
- Mesohippus
