= Extensor carpi radialis muscle =

Extensor carpi radialis muscle may refer to:

- Extensor carpi radialis brevis muscle
- Extensor carpi radialis longus muscle
