= Radial tuberosity =

Bony eminence on the radius

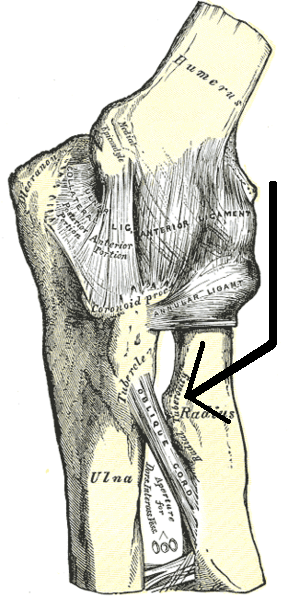
- Left elbow-joint, showing anterior and ulnar collateral ligaments. (Radial tuberosity visible at center right.)

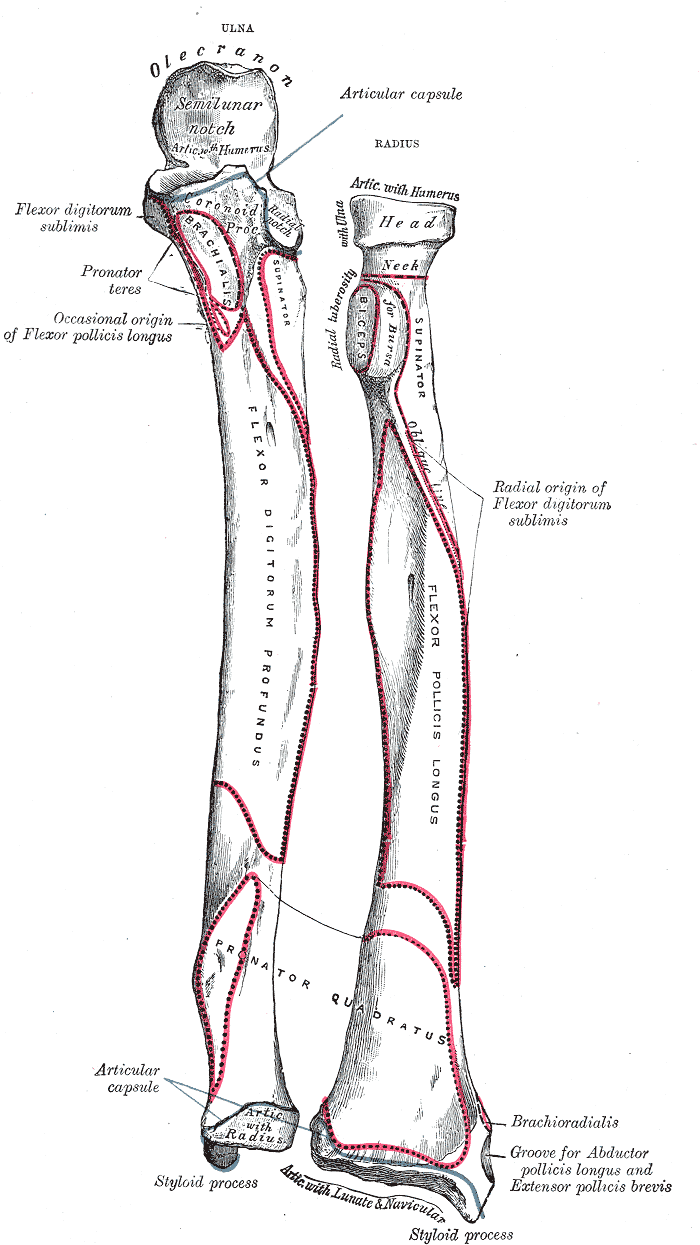
- Bones of left forearm. Anterior aspect. (Radius is bone on right. Radial tuberosity is visible at upper left of radius.)

Details

Identifiers
- Latin: tuberositas radii
- TA98: A02.4.05.007
- TA2: 1216
- FMA: 23489

Beneath the neck of the radius, on the medial side, is an eminence, the radial tuberosity, or bicipital tuberosity; its surface is divided into:

- a posterior, rough portion, for the insertion of the tendon of the biceps brachii.
- an anterior, smooth portion, on which a bursa is interposed between the tendon and the bone.

Ligaments that support the elbow joint also attach to the radial tuberosity.

== Additional images ==
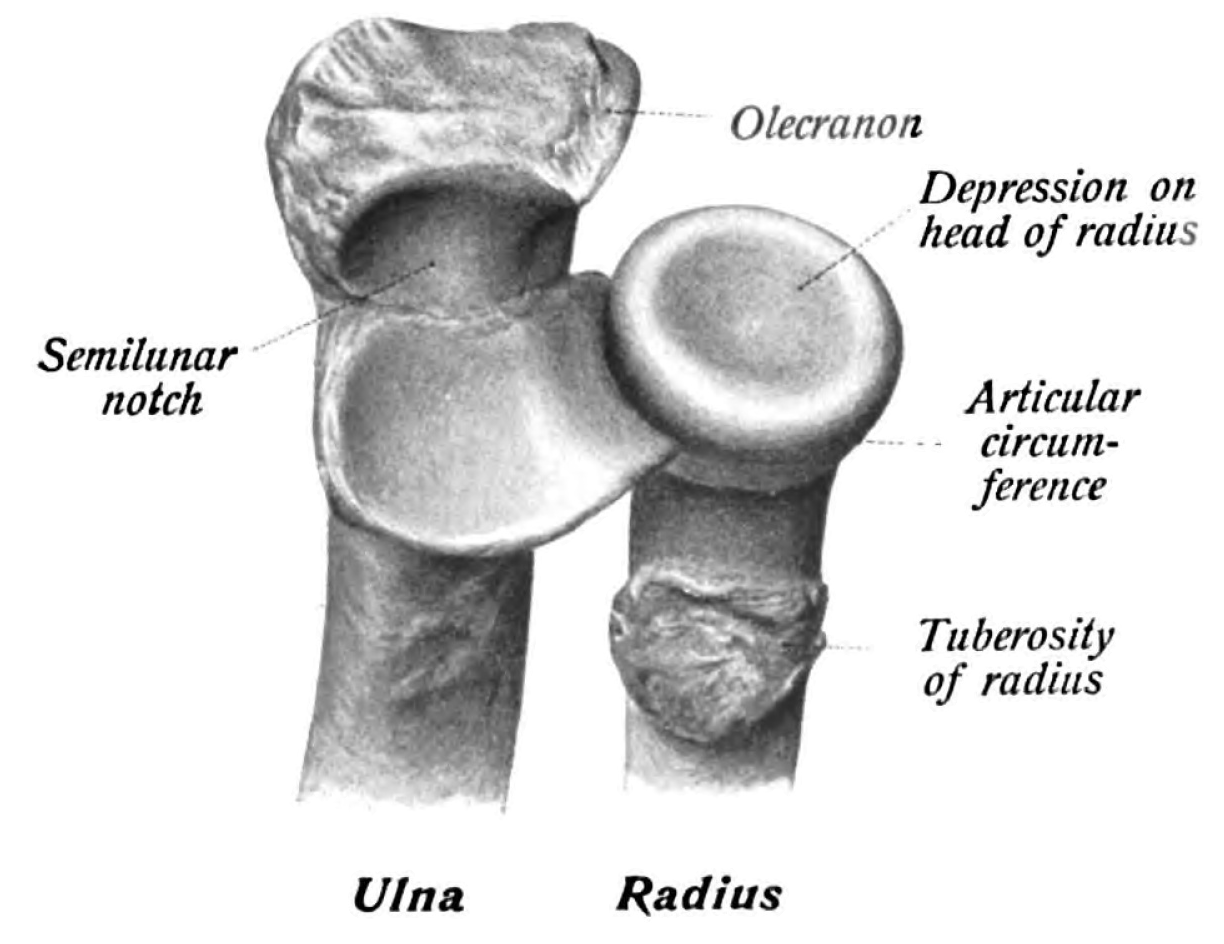
Radial tuberosity shown.

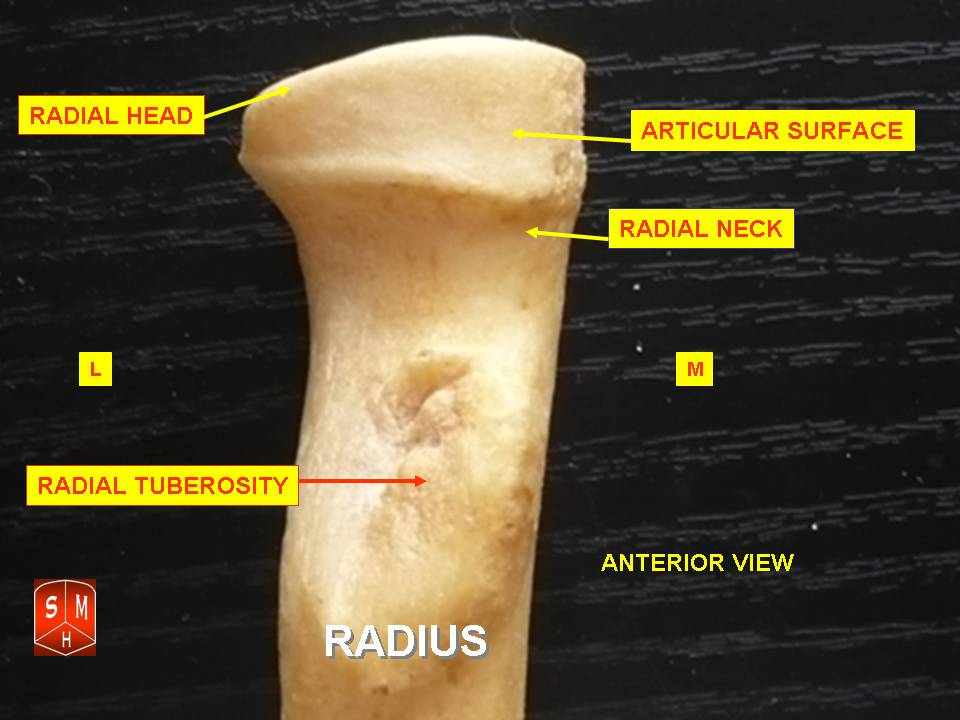
Anterior view. Radial tuberosity.

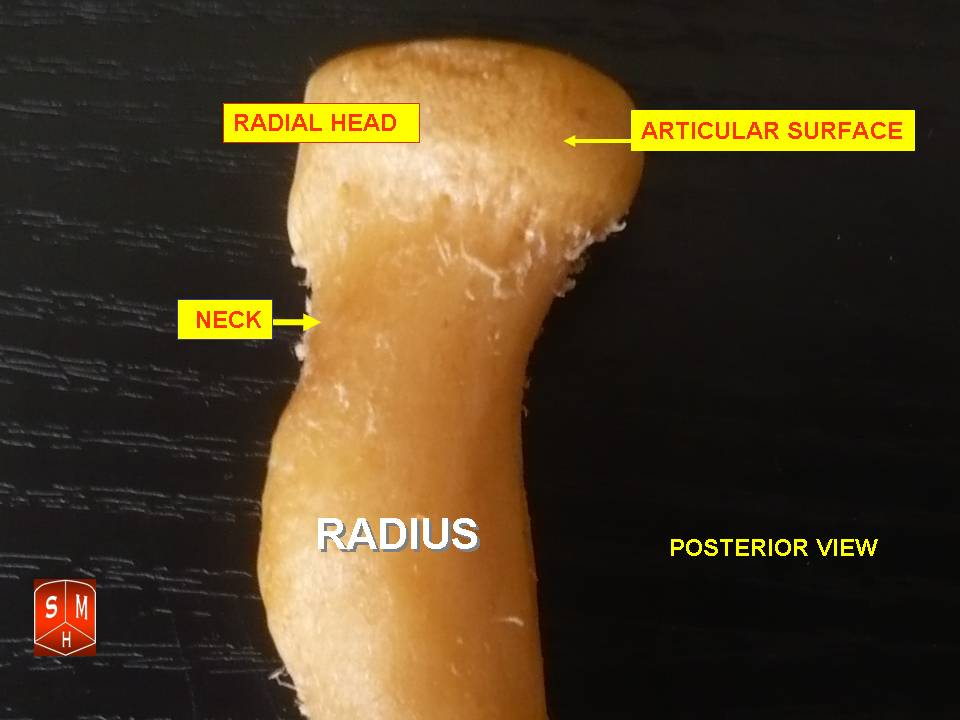
Posterior view. Radial tuberosity.
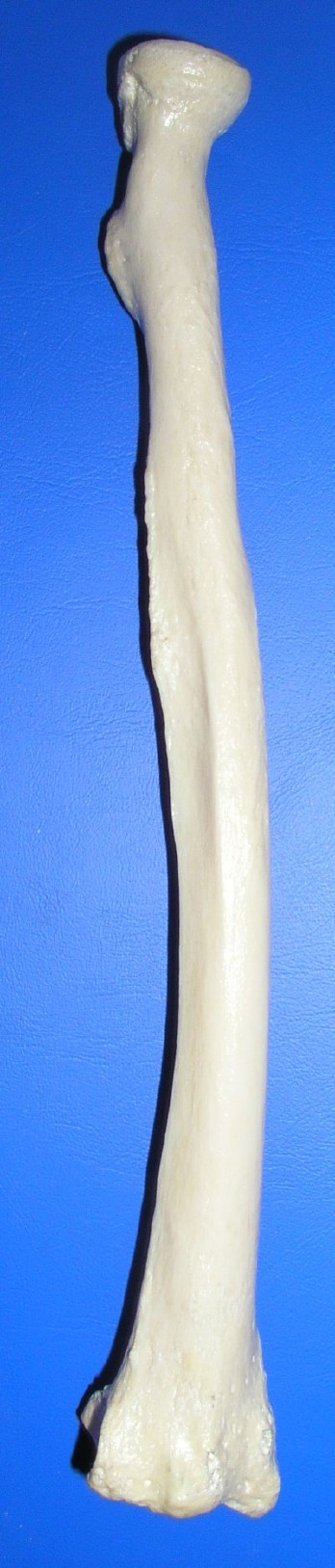
Radial tuberosity below neck.

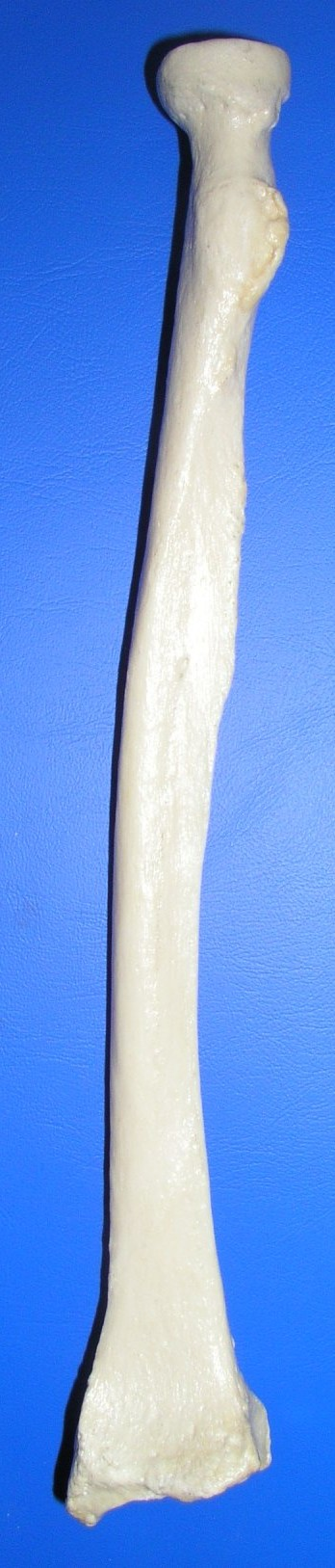
Radial tuberosity below neck.

Left radius - close-up - animation.
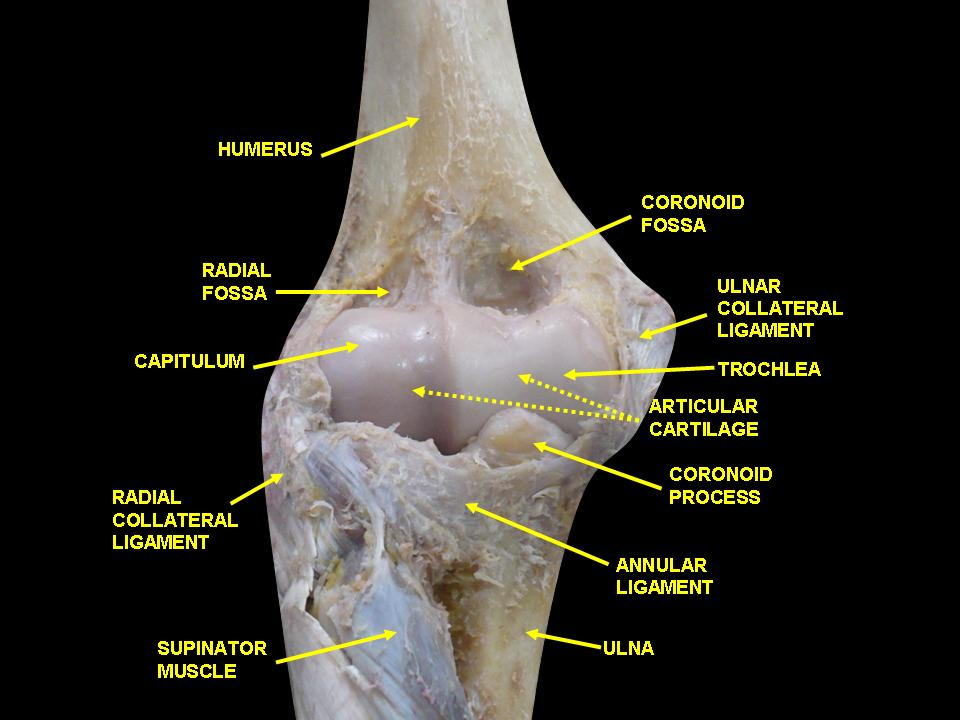
Elbow joint - deep dissection (anterior view, human cadaver)

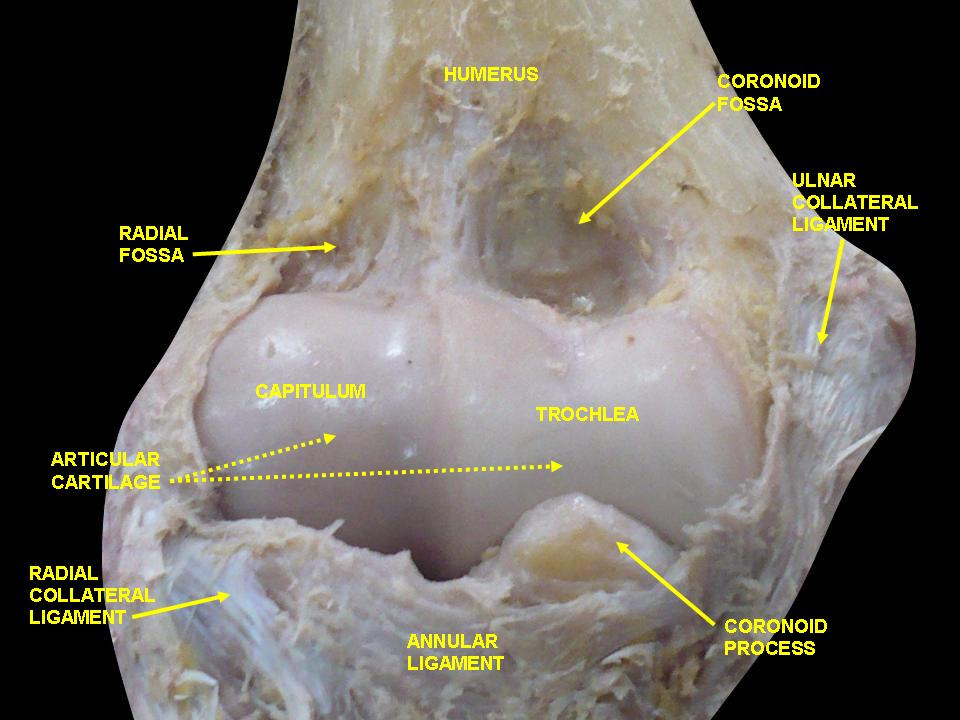
Elbow joint - deep dissection (anterior view, human cadaver)

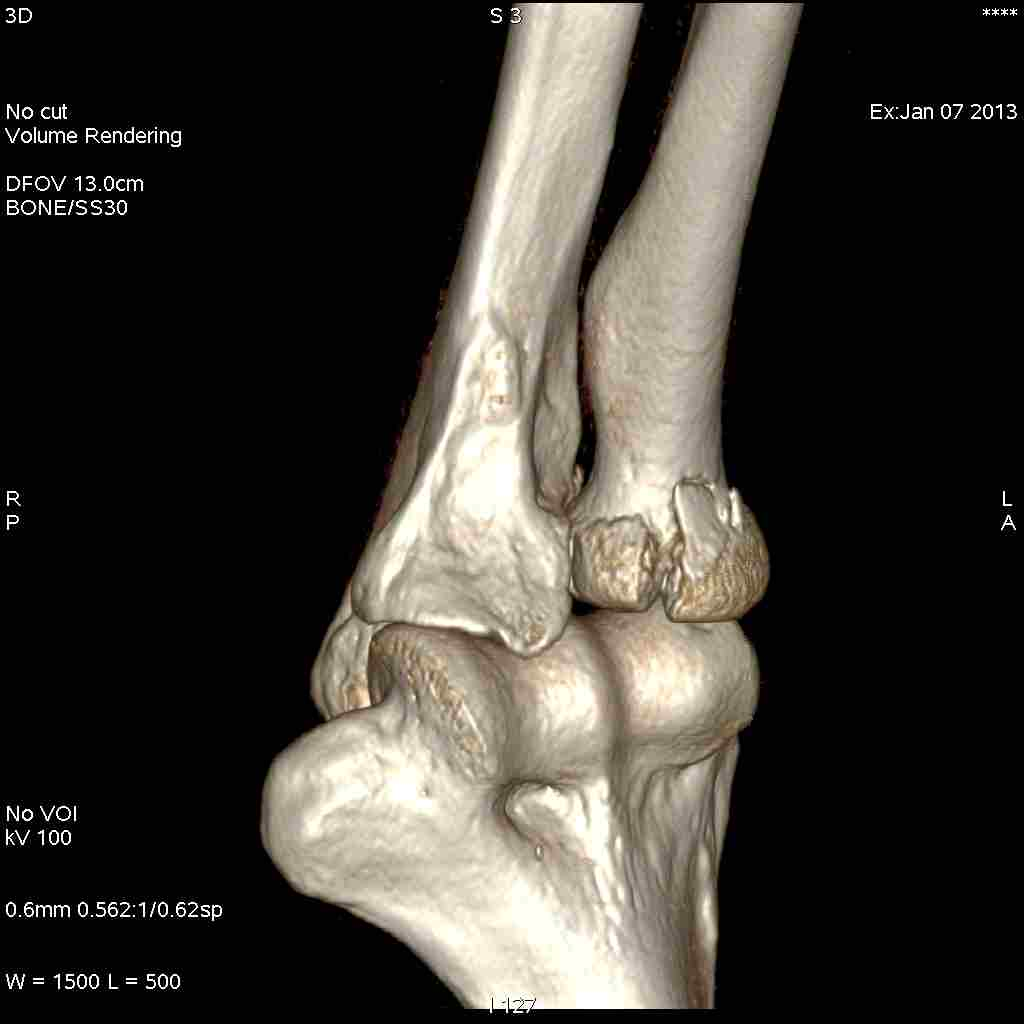
