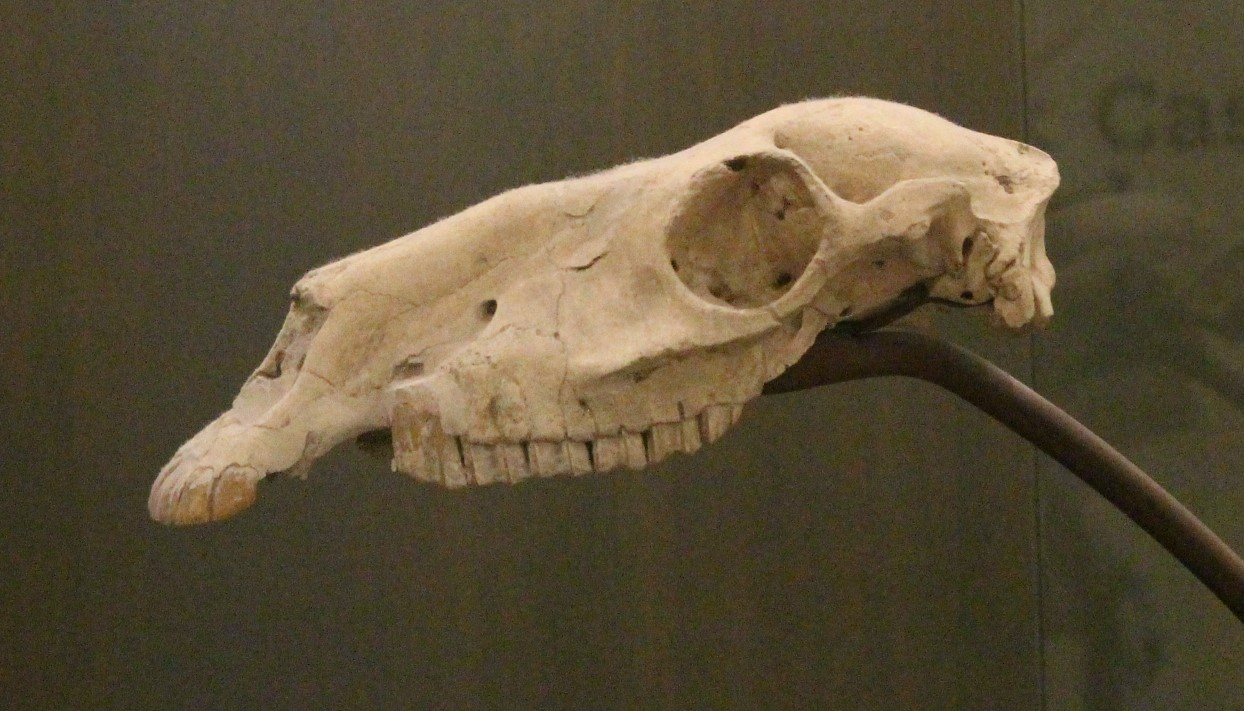
- C. placidus skull, American Museum of Natural History

Scientific classification
- Kingdom: Animalia
- Phylum: Chordata
- Class: Mammalia
- Order: Perissodactyla
- Family: Equidae
- Subfamily: Equinae
- Genus: †Calippus; Matthew & Stirton 1930

Type species
- Calippus placidus (Leidy, 1858)

Species
- C. martini Hesse 1936; C. regulus Johnston 1937

= Calippus (mammal) =

Calippus Temporal range: Barstovian–Blancan ~16–1.8 Ma

Extinct family of mammals

Calippus is an extinct genus of hoofed mammals in the horse family (Equidae), known from the Middle Miocene through the Early Pliocene of North and Central America. Fossils have been found in the Central United States and the Eastern United States, ranging south to Honduras. These equines had high crowned teeth and a quadrangular, wide muzzle, and were small compared to their contemporary relatives, with C. elachistus weighing 49 kg, C. cerasinus weighing 102 kg, 132 kg for C. theristes and 73 kg for C. mccartyi.
