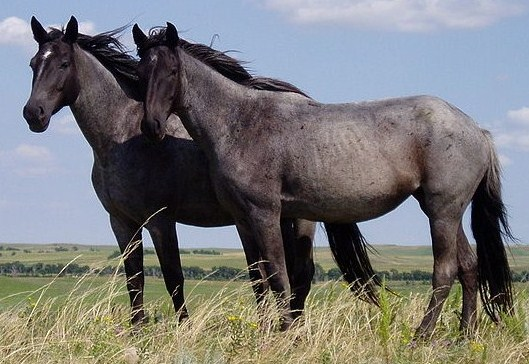
- The Equini Equus caballus (Domestic horse)
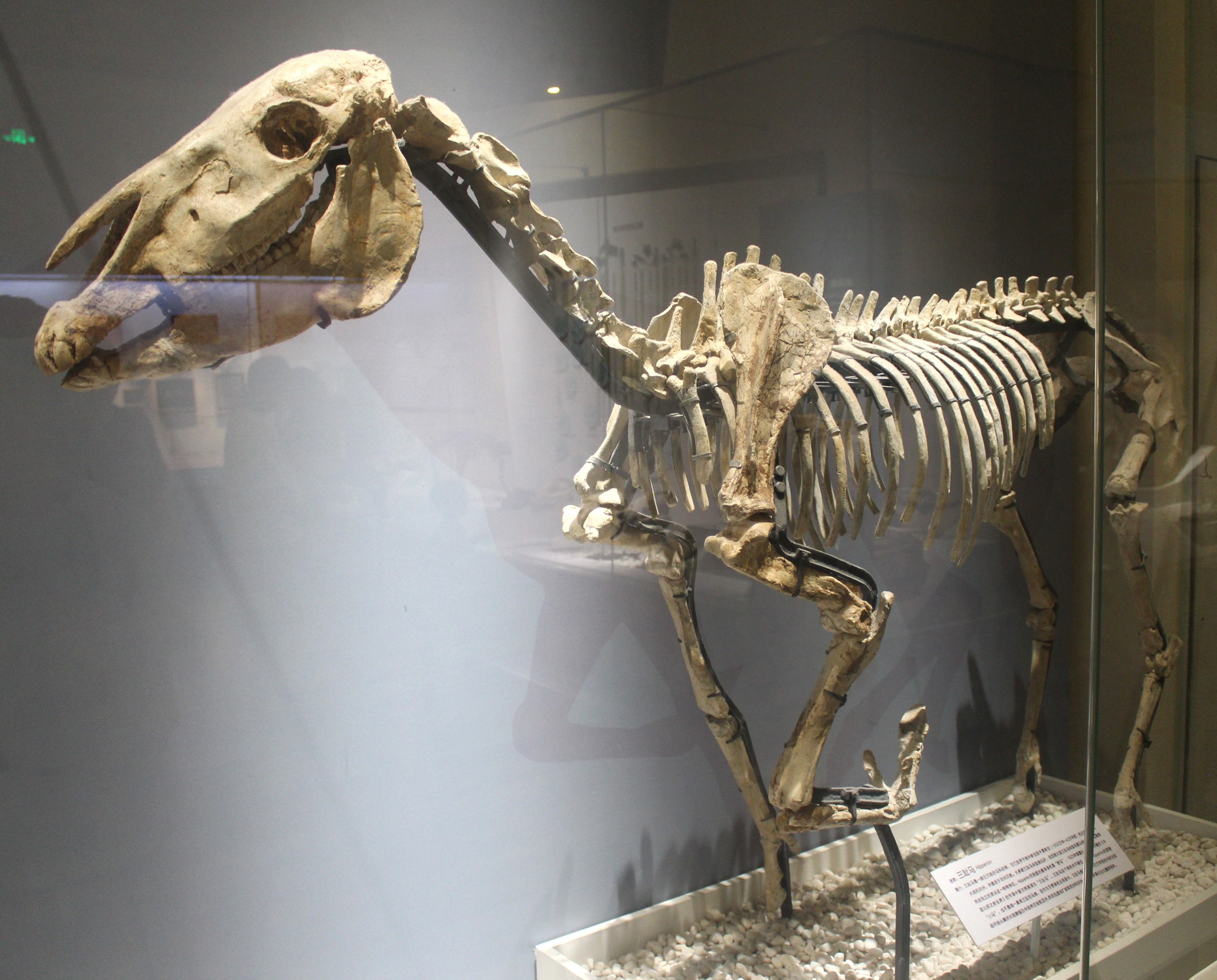
- Skeleton of the three-toed equine †Hipparion (†Hipparionini)

Scientific classification
- Kingdom: Animalia
- Phylum: Chordata
- Class: Mammalia
- Order: Perissodactyla
- Family: Equidae
- Subfamily: Equinae; Steinmann & Döderlein 1890

Tribes
- Equini; †Hipparionini; †Protohippini; †Scaphohippus; †Protohippus; †Calippus; †Merychippus (non-monophyletic)

= Equinae =

Equinae Temporal range: Early Miocene–Recent

Subfamily of mammals

Equinae is a subfamily of the family Equidae, known from the Hemingfordian stage of the Early Miocene (16 million years ago) onwards. Members of the subfamily are referred to as equines; the only extant equines are the horses, asses and zebras of the genus Equus, with two other genera Haringtonhippus and Hippidion becoming extinct at the beginning of the Holocene, around 11–12,000 years ago. They originated in North America, before dispersing via Bering Strait to every continent (except Australia and Antarctica) where some equines eventually became domesticated. Equinae are thought to be a monophyletic grouping.

The subfamily contains three tribes, the extant Equini as well as the extinct Hipparionini and Protohippini. Members of the family ancestrally had three toes, while members of the tribe Equini from the Middle Miocene onwards developed monodactyl feet. They belong to the order Perissodactyla, meaning they are odd-toed animals.

== Sister taxa ==
- Anchitheriinae
- Hyracotheriinae
