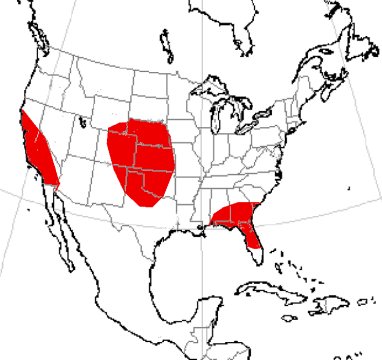
- Range of Yumaceras based on fossil finds

Scientific classification
- Domain: Eukaryota
- Kingdom: Animalia
- Phylum: Chordata
- Class: Mammalia
- Order: Artiodactyla
- Family: †Dromomerycidae
- Tribe: †Cranioceratini
- Genus: †Yumaceras; Frick, 1937

= Yumaceras =

Yumaceras Temporal range: Miocene

Extinct genus of mammals

Yumaceras is an extinct genus of antelope-like palaeomerycid artiodactyl endemic to North America from the Miocene epoch, 13.6—5.33 Ma, existing for approximately 8.27 million years.

== Taxonomy ==
Yumaceras was named by Frick (1937). It was synonymized subjectively with Pediomeryx by Savage (1941) and Janis and Manning (1998); it was reranked as Pediomeryx (Yumaceras) by Webb (1983); it was synonymized subjectively with Cranioceras by Tedford et al. (1987). It was assigned to Pediomeryx by Webb (1983); and to Cranioceratini by Prothero and Liter (2007).

== Fossil distribution ==
- Norris Canyon, Contra Costa County, California
- Cambridge Site, Frontier County, Nebraska
- Haile V/XIXA, Alachua County, Florida
