= List of organisms named after the Star Wars series =

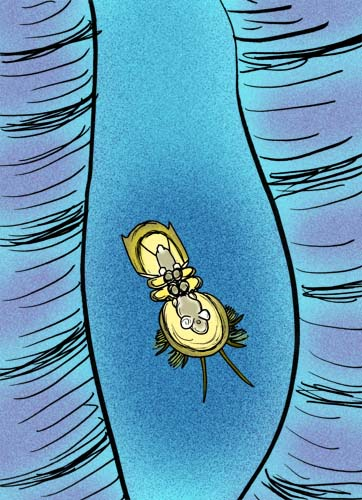
Artist's reconstruction of Han solo, a trilobite species named in-part after Han Solo

Newly created taxonomic names in biological nomenclature often reflect the discoverer's interests or honour those the discoverer holds in esteem, including fictional elements from works like Star Wars. This is a list of real organisms with scientific names chosen to reference the fictional Star Wars franchise.

== Named after Darth Vader ==
Taxon	Type	Notes	Ref
Polemistus vaderi Menke & Vincent, 1983	Wasp	Menke stated that he "wanted to add a little humor in the otherwise rather dry subject of taxonomy".	
Darthvaderum Hunt, 1996	Mite	"When I saw the SEM of the gnathosoma I immediately thought of Darth Vader, evil antihero of Star Wars."	
Adelomyrmex vaderi Fernández, 2003	Ant	"The dark aspect of these ants evokes Darth Vader, the malign character in the Star Wars series, for whom this species is named."	
Thricops vaderi Savage, 2003	Fly		
Agathidium vaderi Miller and Wheeler, 2005	Beetle	Darth Vader "shares with A. vaderi a broad, shiny, helmetlike head."	
Garthambrus darthvaderi McLay & S.H.Tan, 2009	Crab	The specific epithet "alludes to the helmet-like appearance of the front of this species."	
Zoosphaerium darthvaderi Wesener & Bespalova, 2010	Millipede	"From the Star Wars character Darth Vader, whose helmet strongly resembles the anal shield of this species."	
Begonia darthvaderiana Lin, et al	Begonia	"The epithet refers to the resemblance of the unique dark appearance of this new Begonia to that of warrior Darth Vader"	
Diastolinus vaderi Hart and Ivie, 2016	Beetle	The species has a "shiny black head and pronotum that bear a striking resemblance to the helmet" of Darth Vader.	
Lepidogryllus darthvaderi Desutter-Grandcolas & Anso, 2016	Cricket	"Species named after its striking coloration within the genus: wholly dark (bad) with some light patches (good), as the bad fictional character Darth Vader"	
Ricinus vaderi Valan, 2016	Louse	"The first author's fiancée noticed a similarity between the head of the R. vaderi and Darth Vader's helmet."	
†Vaderlimulus Lerner et al., 2017	Horseshoe Crab	A fossil from the Triassic of Idaho, USA. "The generic name Vaderlimulus is suggested by a resemblance of the holotype prosoma to the helmet worn by Darth Vader, a well-known fictional character from the Star Wars film series."	
Epicratinus anakin Gonçalves & Brescovit, 2020	Spider	"Anakin is a character which change[s] from the light side to the dark side of the 'Force' and becomes evil in the plot. The two colors of the male carapace remind that change."	
Epicratinus vader Gonçalves & Brescovit, 2020	Spider	"Darth Vader is a character which wears a costume and black helmet, like the color of the male carapace."	
Leucothoe darthvaderi Cummings, White & Thomas, 2023	Amphipod	"Named for Darth Vader from the Star Wars movie series about the takeover of the Imperial rebel army, in reference to the rapid appearance and colonization of L. darthvaderi sp. nov. in the host sponge Cliona varians.	
Evarcha darthvaderi Yu & Zhang, 2024	Spider	"The specific epithet is from "Darth Vader", a character in the Star Wars franchise; it is a tribute to the production of this great film."	
Plutothrix skywalkeri Tselikh, Lee & Ku, 2024	Wasp	"The species is named in honour of George Lucas' "Star Wars" character – "Anakin Skywalker"."	
Apanteles darthvaderi Slater-Baker et al., 2025	Wasp	"The species was named by students from Back Plains State School. The students named the species for a fictional character from the Star Wars space opera franchise, "because this mean little wasp is from the dark side like Darth Vader, because it sucks the life out of the caterpillars.""	
Bathynomus vaderi Ng et al., 2025	Isopod	"The species named after the most famous Sith Lord in the Star Wars movie series, Darth Vader, whose helmet resembles the head of the new Bathynomus species."	
Eviota vader Greenfield, Erdmann & Ichida, 2025	Goby	"The specific epithet is derived from the fictional dark figure Darth Vader in the Star Wars movie franchise [...], referring to the fact that it is the darkest of all described dwarfgobies."	

== Named after Yoda ==
Taxon	Type	Notes	Ref
Polemistus yoda Menke & Vincent, 1983	Wasp	Menke stated that he "wanted to add a little humor in the otherwise rather dry subject of taxonomy".	
Albunione yoda Markham & Boyko, 2003	Isopod	Named "in recognition that the slightly curved long lateral extensions of the female's head resemble the head shape of Yoda with his long drooping ears."	
Yoda Priede, et al, 2012	Acorn worm	"Yoda refers to the lateral lips, which are shaped like the ears of Yoda, a character in the Star Wars universe."	
Meoneura yodai Stuke 2016	Fly	"This species is dedicated to Grand Master Yoda, the smallest Jedi of the Star Wars space opera"	
Phyllagathis yodae C.W. Lin, C.F. Chen & T.Y.A. Yang	Flowering plant	"The specific epithet was chosen afte "Yoda", a character in Star Wars movies, who has a furry, wrinkled and greenish appearance. This new species is characterized by the hairy, rugose and greenish leaves that resembles [sic] Yoda, therefore we choose this special character as the epithet."	
Yodanoe Bonifácio & Menot, 2018	Scale worm	"This genus is dedicated to Yoda, the Grand Master of the Jedi Order. The name is composed by Yoda and 'noe' from Polynoe, the ancient Greek nymph."	
Trigonopterus yoda Riedel, 2019	Weevil	The name "appears to fit to a small greenish forest-dwelling creature".	
Epicratinus yoda Gonçalves & Brescovit, 2024	Spider	The specific epithet is a noun taken in apposition and is in reference to Jedi Master Yoda, a fictional character in George Lucas film, "Star Wars". Yoda is the smallest of the Jedi Council in size, with three fingers in hand, just like his RTA.	
Plutothrix yodai Tselikh, Lee & Ku, 2024	Wasp	"The species is named in honour of George Lucas' "Star Wars" character – "Yoda" is the Grand Master of the Jedi Order."	

== Named after Luke Skywalker ==
Taxon	Type	Notes	Ref
Sclerobunus skywalkeri Derkarabetian & Hedin, 2014	Harvestman	"The specific epithet is in reference to the character Luke Skywalker and is used to recognize the multi-generational influence and significance of the original Star Wars trilogy. This name also reflects the fact that this species is found only at high elevations in 'sky island' montane habitats, and thus appears to 'walk the sky'."	
Hoolock tianxing Fan et al, 2017	Gibbon	"Tianxing constitutes the pinyin transliteration of 天行, meaning heaven's movement or skywalker [...] a name referring to the unique locomotory mode of gibbons" The species was given the common name "Skywalker hoolock gibbon".	
Romanogobio skywalkeri Friedrich et al, 2018	Ray-finned fish	"Named for Luke Skywalker, the hero of the movie 'Star Wars: Episode IV—A New Hope'"	
Epicratinus luke Gonçalves & Brescovit, 2024	Spider	The specific epithet is a noun taken in apposition and is in reference to Luke Skywalker, a fictional character in George Lucas film, "Star Wars", portrayed in films by Mark Hamill. Luke wields a lightsaber, as the long RTA of that species looks like.	

== Named after Chewbacca ==
Taxon	Type	Notes	Ref
Polemistus chewbacca Menke & Vincent, 1983	Wasp	Menke stated that he "wanted to add a little humor in the otherwise rather dry subject of taxonomy".	
Wockia chewbacca Adamski, 2009	Moth	"The species epithet, chewbacca, is named after the very large and hairy Wookiee character in the Star Wars movie series."	
Trigonopterus chewbacca Van Dam, Laufa and Ridel, 2016	Weevil	"This species has dense scales on the head and the legs, which reminds the authors of Chewbacca's dense fur."	
Urubaxia chewie Paladini & Carvalho, 2016	True bug	"[T]he epithet is relative to the big size of this species compared to other Urubaxia species — for its appearance we name it in honor of the sci-fi character Chewbacca, dearly known as Chewie"	
Austinograea chubacarc Guinot, 2025	Crab	"The expedition name CHUBACARC 2019 cruise rhymes with one Star Wars character; and the specific name chubacarc is an oblique reference to Chewbacca, the furry hero of the popular American Star Wars saga by George Lucas (Lucas film), alluding to the dense setae on the internal surface of the cheliped palm of the species."	
Iridogorgia chewbacca Xu, Watling & Xu, 2025	Coral	"named according to its shape resembling the wookie in the Star Wars movies."	

== Named after Han Solo ==
Taxon	Type	Notes	Ref
†Han solo Turvey, 2005	Trilobite	The fossil was discovered in southern China. It was purportedly named for the Han Chinese people and for being the only member of its genus. Turvey later stated he was dared by friends to name a species after a Star Wars character.	
Urubaxia solo Paladini & Carvalho, 2016	True bug	"the epithet is relative to the paramere with only one sclerotized spine, and in honor of the sci-fi character Han Solo from Star Wars © saga — we grieve his death in the movie The Force Awakens."	
Ceroptres soloi Nastasi, Smith, & Davis, 2024	Wasp	"Named for Han Solo, a character from the Star Wars franchise portrayed by Harrison Ford. Solo is portrayed as a smuggler, thief, and jack-of-all-trades that was instrumental in implementing the destruction of the Death Star."	

== Named after Leia Organa ==
Taxon	Type	Notes	Ref
Coptoborus leia Smith & Cognato, 2021	Bark beetle	"The species is setose and round like the character's bun-styled hair."	
Epicratinus leia Gonçalves & Brescovit, 2024	Spider	The specific epithet is a noun taken in apposition and is in reference to Princess Leia Organa, a fictional character in George Lucas film, "Star Wars", portrayed in films by Carrie Fisher. In her first appearance, Leia has her hair curled up like a headphone, which resembles the female's epigynum.	

== Named after Padmé Amidala ==
Taxon	Type	Notes	Ref
Begonia amidalae Lin, et al	Begonia	"With embellished silvery spots on dark sheen green foliages, the appearance of this new species is reminiscent of the starry sky. We have, therefore, ventured to choose a beautiful role of Star Wars as the epithet."	
†Xenokeryx amidalae Sánchez et al, 2015	Ruminant	"Referred to the fictional character Padmé Amidala from Star Wars, due to the striking resemblance that the occipital appendage of Xenokeryx bears to one of the hairstyles that the aforementioned character shows in The Phantom Menace feature film."	

== Named after Obi-Wan Kenobi ==
Taxon	Type	Notes	Ref
Tetramorium obiwan Hita Garcia & Fisher, 2014	Ant	"The name of the new species is inspired by a fictional character from George Lucas' Star Wars universe: the wise Jedi master Obi-Wan Kenobi."	
Plutothrix kenobii Tselikh, Lee & Ku, 2024	Wasp	"The species is named in honour of George Lucas' "Star Wars" character – "Obi-Wan Kenobi"."	

== Named after Jabba the Hutt ==
Taxon	Type	Notes	Ref
Osedax jabba Rouse et al, 2018	Annelid	"The trunk of the new species is reminiscent of the tail of the mythical creature Jabba the Hutt"	
Ceroptres jabbai Nastasi, Smith, & Davis, 2024	Wasp	"Named for Jabba the Hutt, a crimelord from the Star Wars franchise. Jabba is known for his indulgence in all senses, which is particularly showcased in the 1983 film Return of the Jedi. We apply this name to C. jabbai specifically because C. jabbai exhibits the most expansive host preferences of known Ceroptres species, with three known host gall species, therein displaying overindulgence in an inquiline gall wasp."	

== Named after Ewoks ==
Taxon	Type	Notes	Ref
Crocydocinus ewok Lee, Forges & Ng, 2019	Crab	"The species is name after a Star Wars movie character, Ewok, due to the fuzzy and woolly appearance of the new species."	
Trigonopterus ewok Narakusumo & Riedel, 2021	Weevil	"This epithet is a noun in apposition based on the fictional character of small bear-like creatures from Star Wars VI movie."	

== Named after Porgs ==
Taxon	Type	Notes	Ref
Crocydocinus porg Lee, Forges & Ng, 2019	Crab	"The species is named after a Star Wars movie character, Porg, due to its woolly appearance."	
Trigonopterus porg Narakusumo & Riedel, 2019	Weevil	Named after the "fictional penguin-like character Porg in the Star Wars movies. This species inhabiting a remote island has the same color combination of black, orange and white."	

== Named after other characters and elements ==
Taxon	Type	Named for	Notes	Ref
"Candidatus Midichloria mitochondrii"	Bacterium	Midi-chlorians	"Midichlorians are microscopic symbionts that reside within the cells of living things and 'communicate with the Force'." Candidatus Midichloria lives symbiotically in the ovary cells of female ticks.	
Aptostichus sarlacc Bond, 2012	Trapdoor spider	Sarlacc	"The specific epithet is a noun in apposition taken from the fictional creature in George Lucas' science fiction saga, Star Wars: Return of the Jedi."	
Tetramorium jedi Hita Garcia & Fisher, 2012	Ant	Jedi	"This new species is named after the fictional, noble, and wise guardians of peace from the Star Wars universe created by George Lucas."	
Peckoltia greedoi Armbruster, Werneke & M. Tan, 2015	Catfish	Greedo	"Named for Greedo of Rodia, a bounty hunter killed by Han Solo in Chalmun's Spaceport Cantina [...] with whom this species shares a remarkable resemblance."	
Ackbaria Campodonico & Zahniser, 2017	True bug	Admiral Ackbar	"This genus is named after Admiral Gial Ackbar"	
Tropostreptus droides Enghoff, 2017	Millipede	Battle Droid	"The name is an adjective and refers to the (rather remote) resemblance between the gonopod coxae of the new species and a pair of Star Wars battle droids."	
Kaytuesso Carjaval, Faundez & Rider, 2018	True bug	K-2SO	"Kaytuesso is named for K-2SO, a character (commonly known as "Kaytuesso") from "Rogue One: A Star Wars Story" movie. K-2SO was an imperial android that was reprogrammed by the rebel alliance; it was characterized by its dark color and yellowish lateral ornaments. This new genus shares with K-2SO the dark color with yellowish lateral ornaments, and the shield-like appearance of the dorsal sclerites."	
Stormtropis Perafán, Galvis & Pérez-Miles, 2019	Baldlegged spiders	Stormtroopers	"The stormtroopers are the soldiers of the main ground force of the Galactic Empire. These soldiers are very similar to each other, with some capacity for camouflage but with unskillful movements, like this group of spiders."	
†Cambroraster falcatus Moysiuk & Caron, 2019	Radiodont	Millennium Falcon	"The species name also relates to its field nickname 'spaceship' in reference to the H-element's resemblance to the fictional Millennium Falcon starship in the Star Wars franchise."	
Meoneura artoodetoo Stuke & Barták, 2019	Fly	R2-D2	"This species is dedicated [..] to the fictional robot R2-D2 from George Lucas' Star Wars movies. R2-D2 is a small and inconspicuous robot but saved the world."	
Adeonellopsis macewindui Liow & Gordon, 2020	Bryozoan	Mace Windu	"Named for the fictional character Mace Windu in the Star Wars franchise; he uniquely wielded a purple-bladed lightsaber. The name alludes to the new purplish-bladed Adeonellopsis species while indirectly acknowledging the Black Lives Matter movement through African-American actor Samuel L. Jackson who played the role of Mace Windu."	
Epicratinus dookan Gonçalves & Brescovit, 2020	Spider	Dookan, the Brazilian name for Count Dooku	"Count Dookan [Brazilian name] is a character which wears a curved hilt of his lightsaber, as the curved dorsal projection at the base of the RTA."	
Lygaeus mauli Faúndez, Carvajal, Diez & Raffo, 2021	True bug	Darth Maul	"Named after the fictional character from the Star Wars saga, Maul (formerly Darth Maul), who has a red-and-black patterned body like this species; furthermore, much like this fictional character who hails from the remote planet Dathomir, this new species is found only in remote areas of southern Patagonia."	
†Euronecturus grogu Macaluso, Villa & Mörs, 2022	Salamander	Grogu	"[L]ike the new taxon herein described, Grogu is a member of an ancient lineage we know nothing or almost nothing about, which appears in an unexpected place at an unexpected time."	
Fortia Villarreal, Kury & Colmenares, 2022	Harvestman	The Force	"referring to the biological/metaphysical/spiritual power depicted in the fictional universe of the epic space-opera Star Wars [...] and relating to the contrasting species, which are juxtaposed in a yin-yang dualistic relationship as contrary forces."	
Fortia jedi Villarreal, Kury & Colmenares, 2022	Harvestman	Jedi	"from the neologism jedi, a monastic order of academics and peacekeepers, users of the light side of the energy field known as The Force in the Star Wars fictional universe. Specific epithet in reference to the light coloration of the type specimen."	
Fortia sith Villarreal, Kury & Colmenares, 2022	Harvestman	Sith	"from neologism sith, an ancient monastic and kraterocratic organization devoted to the dark side of the energy field known as The Force, and main antagonists of the Star Wars fictional universe. [...] Specific epithet in reference to the dark coloration of the type specimens."	
Mesobiotus mandalori Erdmann et al., 2024	Tardigrade	Mandalore	"The name mandalori alludes to the fictional planet of Mandalore (home world of Mandalorians), from the Star Wars Universe. The first ever visual depiction of Mandalore showed this world as being covered by dense forests, and its inhabitants living in villages hidden in the tree canopies. This reflects the type locality of the new species, i.e. moss on trees in deep forest."	
Platecrizotes jedii Tselikh, Lee & Ku, 2024	Wasp	Jedi		
†Kraytdraco spectatus Mussini et al., 2025	Priapulid	Krayt dragon	A 500-million-year-old worm named after the Krayt dragon due to the size of the fossil and its abundance of teeth.	
Metuonella skywalkerorum Morassi, Bonfitto & Nappo, 2025	Sea snail	Skywalker family	"Dedicated to the Skywalker, iconic fictional characters from the Star Wars series, symbols of hope, courage, and the eternal balance between light and darkness, so that their example may continue to inspire future generations in the universe of science and imagination."	

== Named after Star Wars actors ==
Taxon	Type	Named for	Notes	Ref
Epicratinus temuerai Gonçalves & Brescovit, 2020	Spider	Temuera Morrison	The specific epithet, temuerai, is a patronym in honour of Temuera Derek Morrison in recognition of his work as a "Clone of the Clone Army of the Republic" in George Lucas film, "Star Wars Episode II – The Clone Wars". Temuera lent his face and body to the soldiers of the republic's clone army, as this species resembles Epicratinus pugionifer.	
Tianchisaurus nedegoapeferima † Dong, 1993	Dinosaur	Laura Dern and others	Named for actors involved in the 1993 film Jurassic Park: Neill, Dern, Goldblum, Attenborough, Peck, Ferrero, Richards, and Mazzello. The type specimen was informally referred to as "Jurassosaurus". The species name was proposed by director Steven Spielberg. Dern played Vice-Admiral Holdo in The Last Jedi.	
Venomius tomhardyi Rossi, Castanheira, Baptista & Framenau, 2023	Spider	Tom Hardy	The monotypic genus Venomius had been named after the Marvel Comics character Venom, and the species was named "in reference to the English actor Edward Thomas 'Tom' Hardy, who plays the character Eddie Brock and his alter-ego Venom in the super-hero films of the same name." Hardy played the Stormtrooper FN-926 in The Last Jedi in a deleted scene.	
Calponia harrisonfordi Platnick, 1993	Spider	Harrison Ford	Named after Harrison Ford to thank him for narrating a documentary for the Natural History Museum in London.	
Pheidole harrisonfordi E. O. Wilson, 2002	Ant	Harrison Ford	Named after Harrison Ford in honor of his work in conservation.	
Tachymenoides harrisonfordi Lehr, Cusi, Fernandez, Vera & Catenazzi, 2023	Snake	Harrison Ford	"We dedicate this species to Harrison Ford, actor and conservationist, in recognition of his work for Conservation International and his voice for nature (e.g., 'Nature is speaking – Harrison Ford is The Ocean')."	
Pseudoloxops harrisonfordi Balukjian & Van Dam, 2024	Bug	Harrison Ford	A leaf bug from Tahiti, "named in honor of actor Harrison Ford, whose commitment to environmental protection has helped conserve natural resources around the world."	
Cantharis mikkelsenorum † Fanti & Damgaard, 2018	Beetle	Lars Mikkelsen and Mads Mikkelsen	A fossil soldier beetle found in Baltic amber from the Eocene of Kaliningrad Oblast. "This new species is named in honour of the Danish actors Lars Dittmann Mikkelsen and Mads Dittmann Mikkelsen, in recognition of their contribution to the television, theatre and film industries." Lars played Grand Admiral Thrawn in Star Wars Rebels and Ahsoka, while Mads appeared in Rogue One as Galen Erso.	
Ctenus monaghani Jäger, 2013	Spider	Dominic Monaghan	A wandering spider from Laos, "named in honour of the British actor Dominic Monaghan who filmed together with the author in Laos for the documentary show Wild Things; Dom's enthusiasm for nature in general, and spiders and other little respected animals in particular, was the driving force behind the production of this documentary." Subsequently transferred to genus Bowie (which is named after musician David Bowie). Monaghan played Beaumont Kin in Star Wars: The Rise of Skywalker.	

== See also ==
- List of unusual biological names
- List of organisms named after works of fiction
- List of organisms named after famous people
