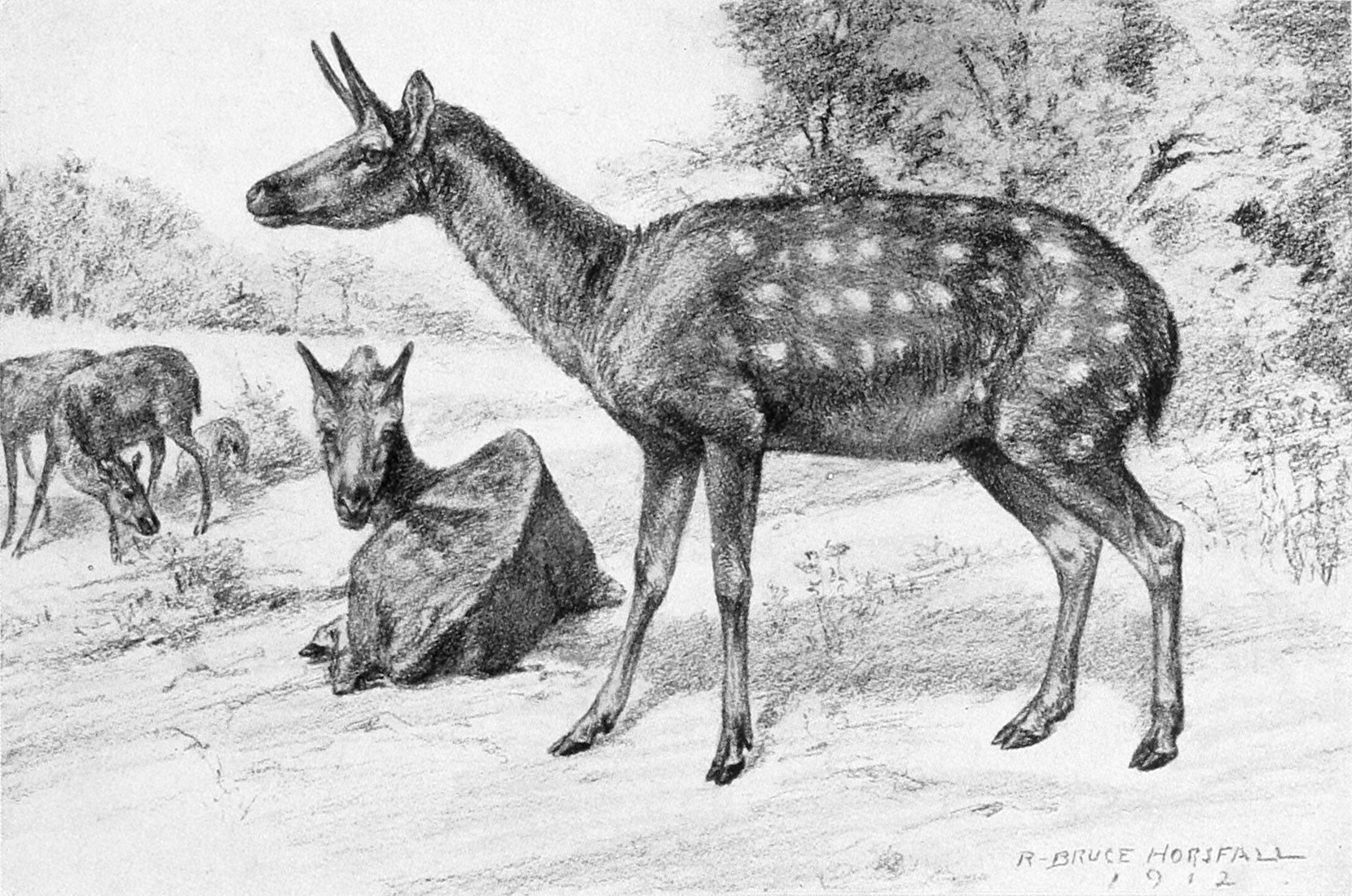
- Restoration of Subdromomeryx antilopinus by Robert Bruce Horsfall

Scientific classification
- Kingdom: Animalia
- Phylum: Chordata
- Class: Mammalia
- Order: Artiodactyla
- Family: †Dromomerycidae
- Subfamily: †Dromomerycinae
- Genus: †Subdromomeryx; Scott, 1894

= Subdromomeryx =

Subdromomeryx Temporal range: Miocene

Extinct genus of mammals

Subdromomeryx is an extinct genus of Artiodactyla, of the family Palaeomerycidae, endemic to North America.
