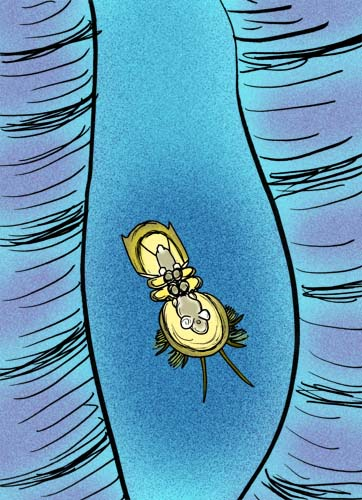
- Artist's reconstruction

Scientific classification
- Domain: Eukaryota
- Kingdom: Animalia
- Phylum: Arthropoda
- Class: †Trilobita (?)
- Order: †Agnostida
- Family: †Diplagnostidae
- Genus: †Han; Turvey, 2005
- Species: †H. solo

Binomial name
- †Han solo Turvey, 2005

= Han (trilobite) =

Han solo Temporal range: Middle Ordovician

Extinct genus of trilobites

Han is a monotypic genus of agnostid trilobite, whose sole member is Han solo. The type specimen of H. solo was found in marine strata of the Arenig to Llanvirn-aged Zitai Formation of Middle Ordovician southern China and is named after the character in Star Wars.

== Taxonomy ==
This taxon was erected in 2005, based upon fossil material found in beds of lower Zitai Formation exposed in Maocaopu, Reshi, Taoyuan County in north Hunan, China. Fossil material include a cephalon and two pygidia. It was found to belong to family Diplagnostidae, subfamily Pseudagnostinae; it was originally thought to be most closely related to the genus Pseudorhaptagnostus, but it differed substantially from that genus in both some important diagnostic characters, and in the age of the beds in it was deposited, so a new genus was erected.

== Etymology ==
According to the original publication, the generic name Han is a reference to the Han Chinese, the largest ethnic group in China; and the specific epithet solo refers to the fact that the species is the youngest Diplagnostidae fossil found to that date, suggesting that it was the last surviving member of that family. However, Samuel Turvey has stated elsewhere that he named it after Han Solo because some friends dared him to name a species after a Star Wars character.

This is not the only unusual scientific name erected by Turvey; in the same paper he named a new species Geragnostus waldorfstatleri, because of "the resemblance of the pygidial axis to the heads of Waldorf and Statler, two characters from The Muppet Show."

== See also ==
- List of organisms named after the Star Wars series
