= Yodanoe =

Scientific classification
- Kingdom: Animalia
- Phylum: Annelida
- Clade: Pleistoannelida
- Subclass: Errantia
- Order: Phyllodocida
- Family: Polynoidae
- Genus: Yodanoe
- Species: Y. desbruyeresi

Binomial name
- Yodanoe desbruyeresi Bonifácio & Menot, 2018

Genus of annelid worms

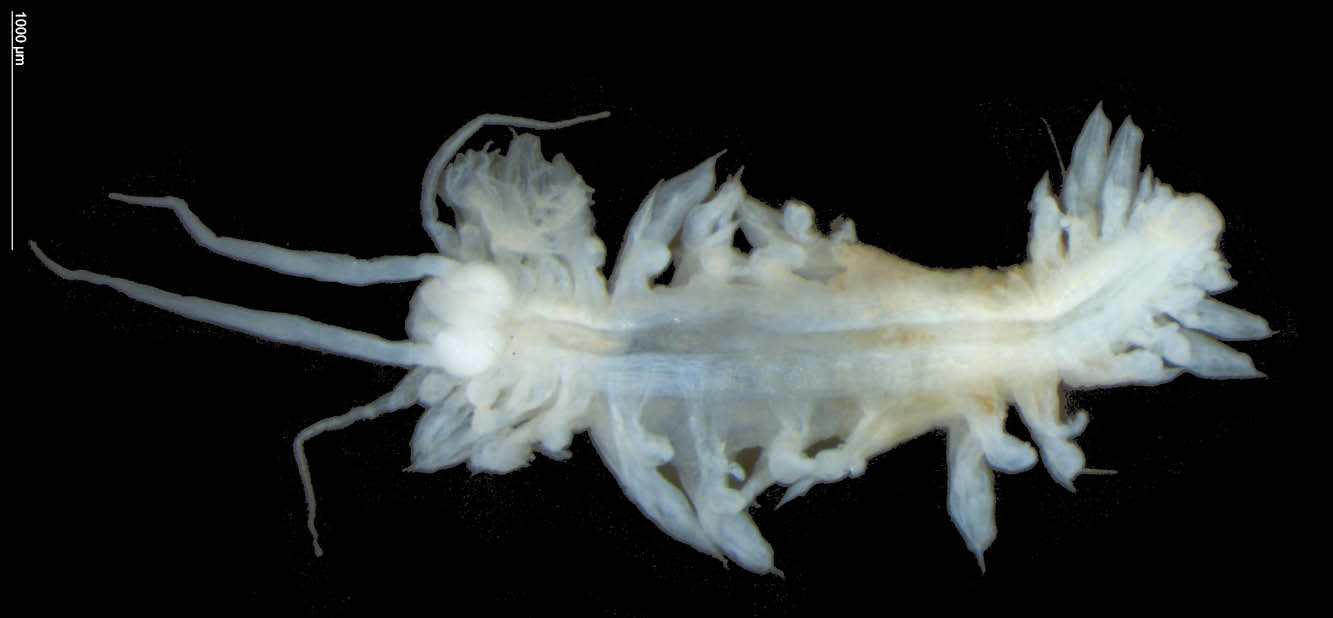

Yodanoe is a genus of marine polychaete worms belonging to the family Polynoidae, the scaleworms. Yodanoe contains a single species, Yodanoe desbruyeresi which is known from the Clarion-Clipperton fracture zone in the equatorial East Pacific Ocean at a depth of almost 5000 m.

== Description ==
Yodanoe desbruyeresi is a short-bodied scale worm with 17 segments and 8 pairs of elytra. The prostomium is bilobed and each lobe tapers to a rounded anterior projection. Lateral antennae are absent and the median antenna is located anteriorly in the middle of the prostomium. The neuropodium is elongate and tapering. The notochaetae taper to a point and have transverse rows of fine teeth. The neurochaetae are slightly flattened distally and have a row of serrations along each margin. The notochaetae are about as thick as the neurochaetae. All neurochaetae taper to simple points, none have bidentate tips.

The genus is dedicated to Yoda, the Grand Master of the Jedi Order in the Star Wars franchise. The name is composed by Yoda and 'noe' from Polynoe, the ancient Greek nymph.

== See also ==
- List of organisms named after the Star Wars series
