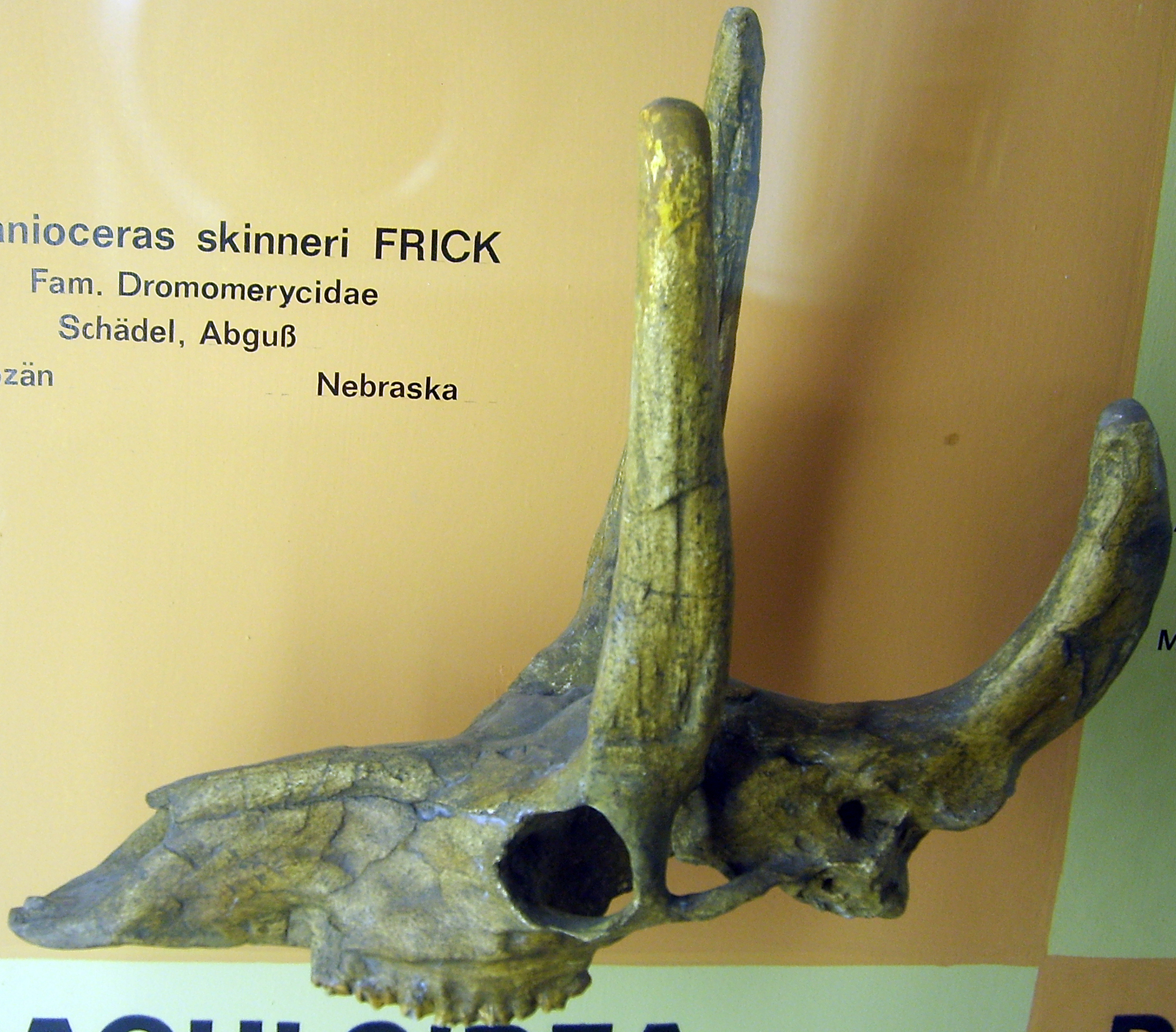
- Procranioceras skinneri skull cast at the Museum für Naturkunde, Berlin

Scientific classification
- Kingdom: Animalia
- Phylum: Chordata
- Class: Mammalia
- Order: Artiodactyla
- Family: †Dromomerycidae
- Tribe: †Cranioceratini
- Genus: †Procranioceras; Frick, 1937

Species
- P. skinneri Frick, 1937
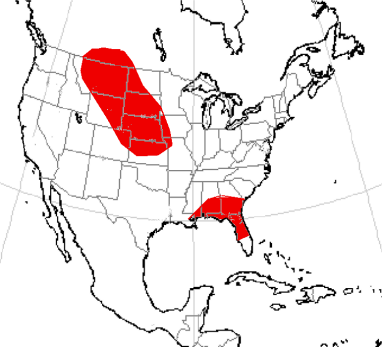

Synonyms
- Cranioceras skinneri (Matthew, 1918)

= Procranioceras =

Procranioceras Temporal range: Middle Miocene

Extinct genus of mammals

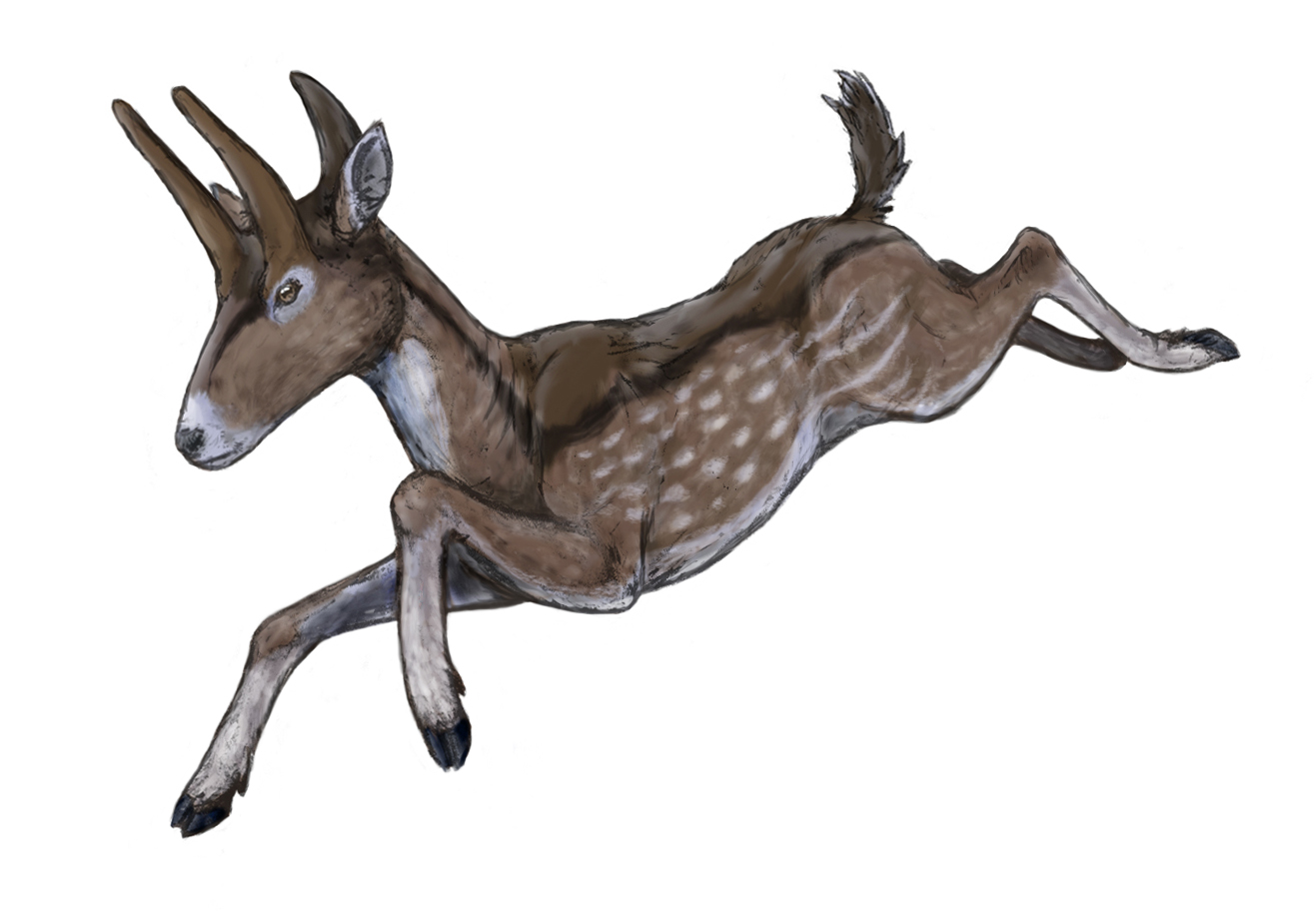
Restoration of a Procranioceras.

Procranioceras is an extinct genus of artiodactyl belonging to the family Dromomerycidae, which was endemic to North America. It lived during the Middle Miocene, 16.0—13.6 Ma, existing for approximately 2.4 million years. Fossils have been found from Florida, Saskatchewan, and Nebraska.

== Palaeoecology ==
Analysis of its skull and tooth morphology paired with examination of its dental microwear and mesowear patterns suggests that Procranioceras skinneri was a browsing herbivore.
