= Diabolocornis =

Diabolocornis Temporal range: Burdigalian

Scientific classification
- Kingdom: Animalia
- Phylum: Chordata
- Class: Mammalia
- Infraclass: Placentalia
- Order: Artiodactyla
- Family: †Dromomerycidae
- Genus: †Diabolocornis
- Species: †D. simonsi

Binomial name
- †Diabolocornis simonsi Beatty, 2010

Extinct genus of palaeomerycid ungulate

Diabolocornis is an extinct monotypic genus of palaeomerycid ungulate that lived in Florida during the Burdigalian stage of the Miocene epoch.

== Etymology ==
The generic name Diabolocornis is derived from the Latin roots diabolo and cornis, meaning devil and horn respectively. The generic name thus means "Devil horn", in reference to the animal's horns. The specific epithet of the type species, Diabolocornis simonsi, honours Erika H. Simons, a Scientific Specialist at the Florida Museum of Natural History.
