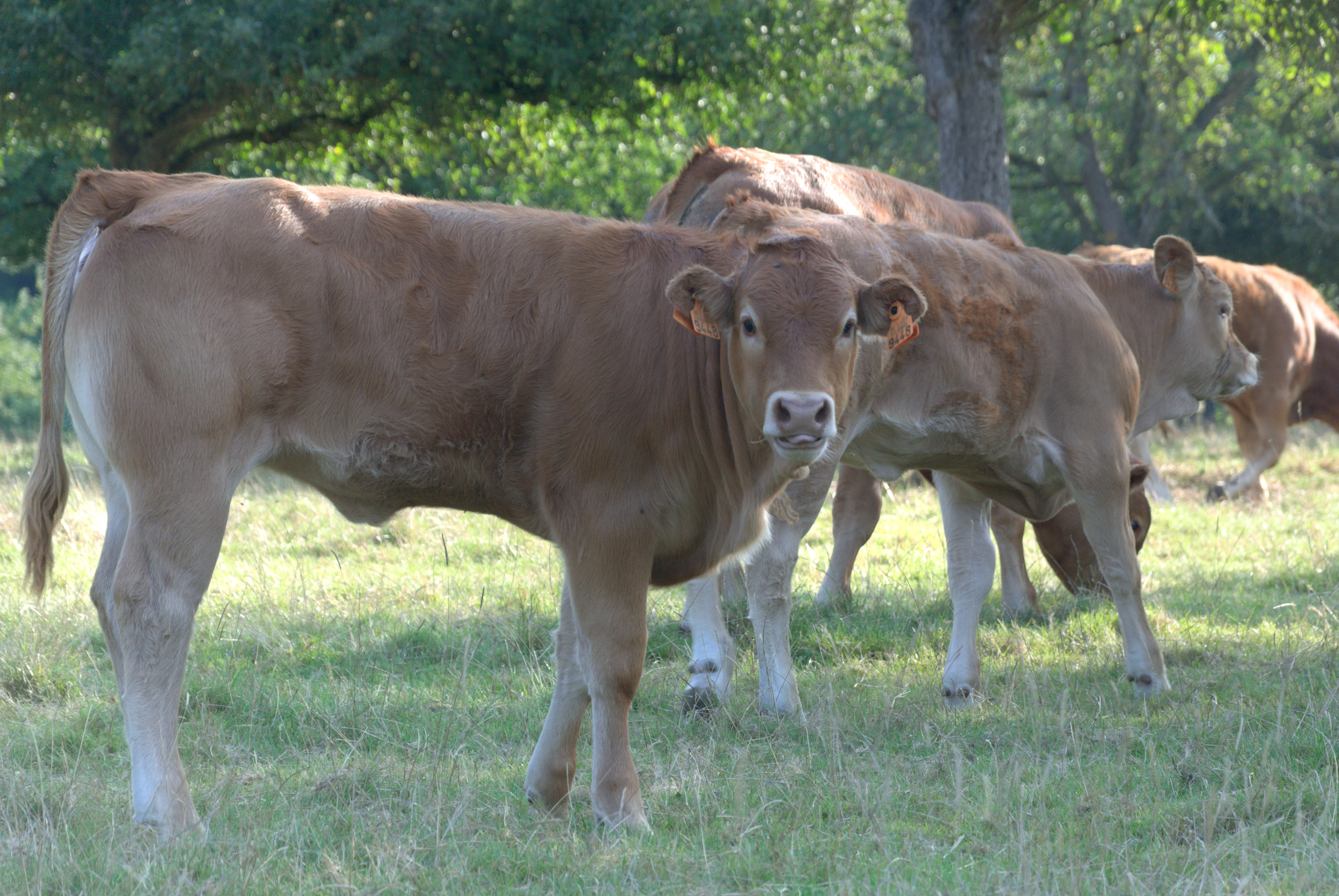
- Domestic cattle (Bos taurus)
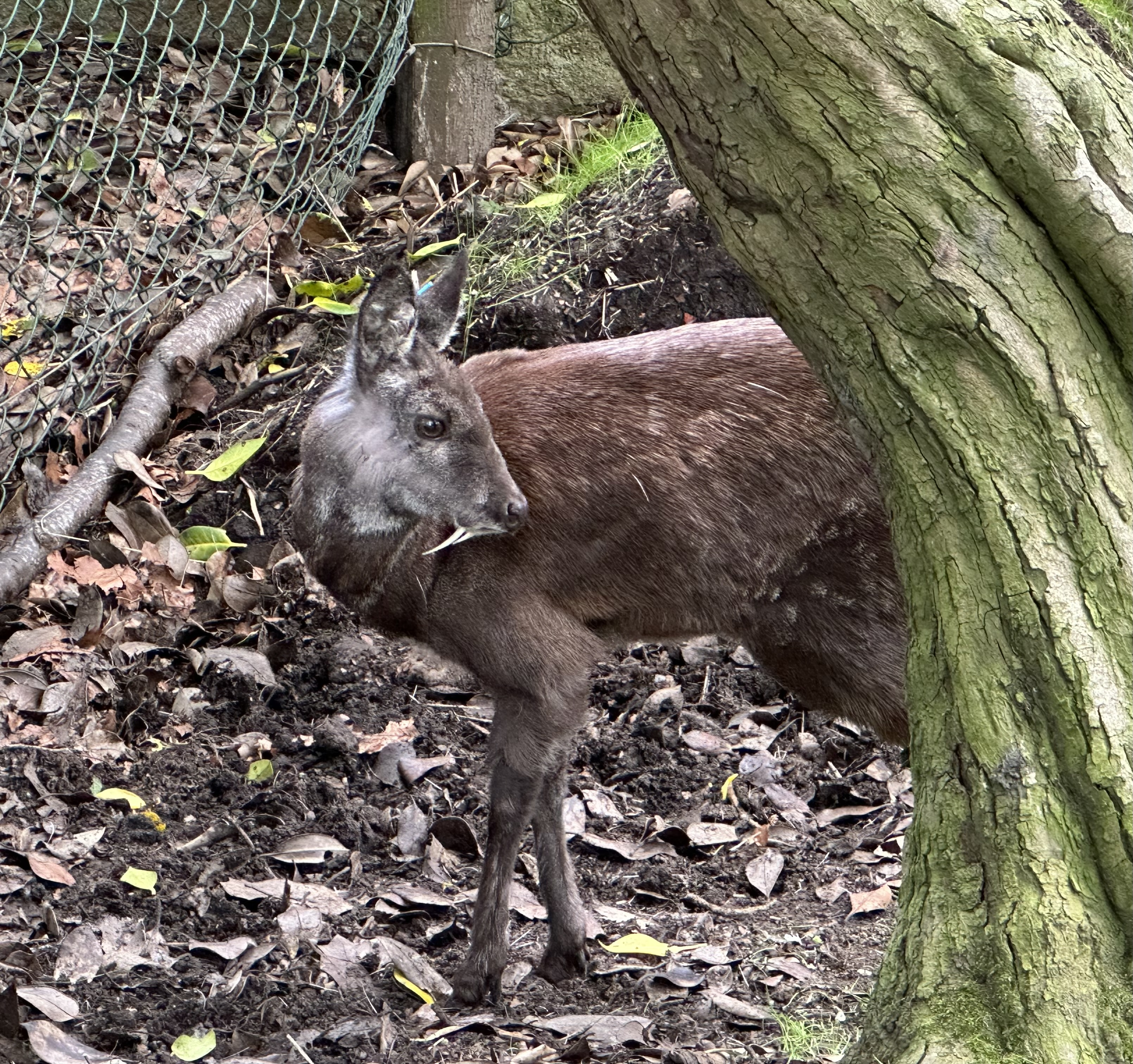
- Siberian musk deer (Moschus moschiferous)

Scientific classification
- Kingdom: Animalia
- Phylum: Chordata
- Class: Mammalia
- Order: Artiodactyla
- Infraorder: Pecora
- Superfamily: Bovoidea; J. E. Gray, 1821

Families
- Bovidae; Moschidae

= Bovoidea =

Bovoidea Temporal range: 20–0 Ma Miocene-present

Superfamily of ruminants

Bovoidea is a superfamily of pecoran ruminants containing the Bovidae and Moschidae. The Bovoidea today is defined in part by very specific dental and anatomical traits, and genetic research indicates that the Moschidae is the sister taxon to the Bovidae.
