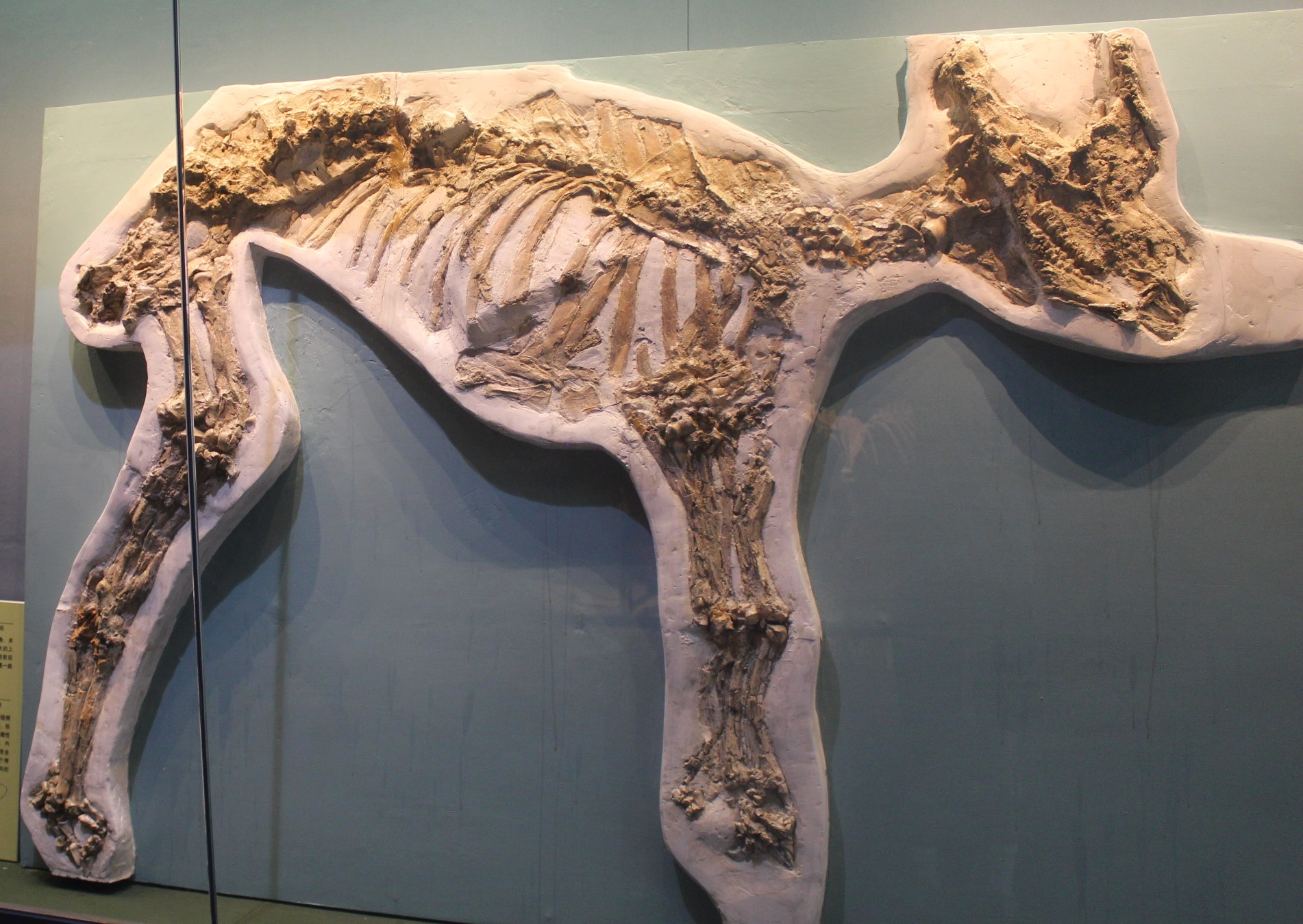
- Fossil specimen, Tianjin Natural History Museum

Scientific classification
- Domain: Eukaryota
- Kingdom: Animalia
- Phylum: Chordata
- Class: Mammalia
- Order: Artiodactyla
- Family: †Palaeomerycidae
- Subfamily: †Palaeomerycinae
- Genus: †Palaeomeryx von Meyer (1834)

= Palaeomeryx =

Palaeomeryx Temporal range: Miocene

Extinct genus of deer

Palaeomeryx is an extinct genus of Artiodactyla, of the family Palaeomerycidae, endemic to Europe and Asia from the Miocene epoch, 16.9 – 7.25 Ma, existing for approximately 9.65 million years.

== Taxonomy ==
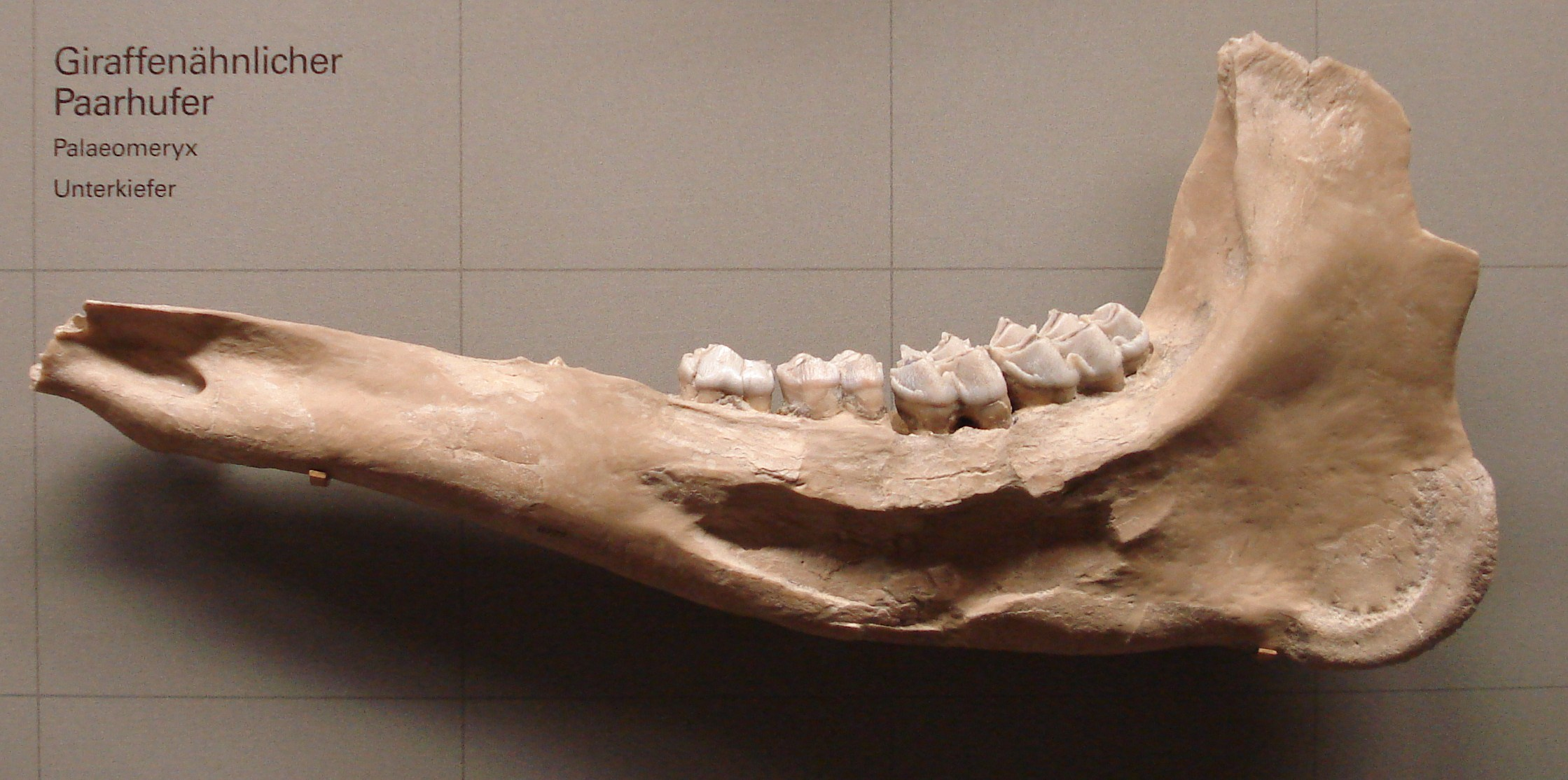
Fossil jaw

Palaeomeryx was named by von Meyer (1834). It is the type genus of Palaeomerycidae, Palaeomerycinae. It was assigned to Palaeomerycidae by Carroll (1988) and Sach and Heizmann (2001); and to Palaeomerycinae by Prothero and Liter (2007).

== Fossil distribution ==
- Amor, Leiria, Portugal
- Level C1, Quarry Quebra Bilhas, Lisbon, Portugal
- Buñol, Valencia, Spain
- Lufeng, Yunnan Province, China
- Kryvyi Rih, Ukraine
