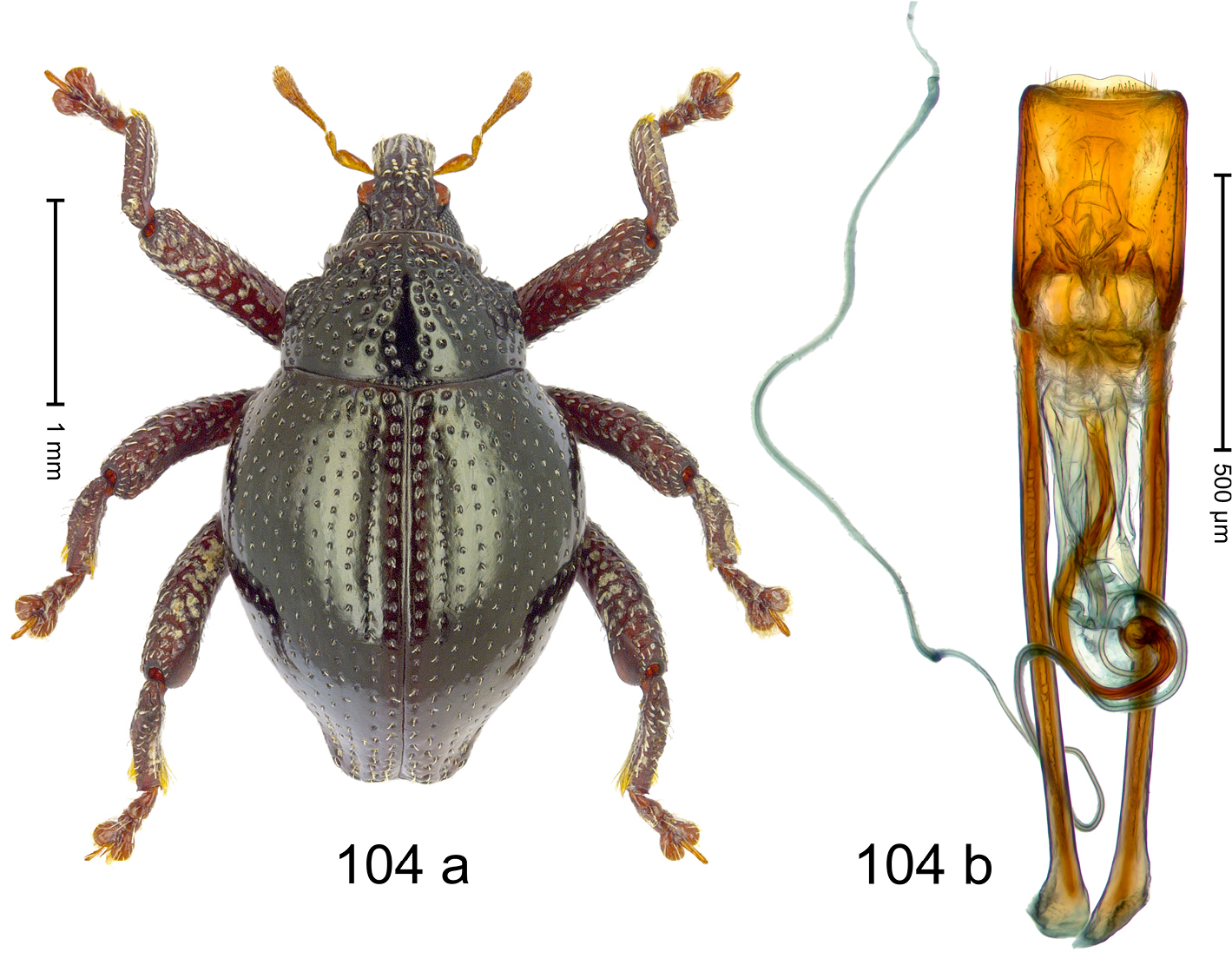

Scientific classification
- Kingdom: Animalia
- Phylum: Arthropoda
- Clade: Pancrustacea
- Class: Insecta
- Order: Coleoptera
- Suborder: Polyphaga
- Infraorder: Cucujiformia
- Family: Curculionidae
- Genus: Trigonopterus
- Species: T. yoda

Binomial name
- Trigonopterus yoda Riedel, 2019

= Trigonopterus yoda =

Species of beetle

Trigonopterus yoda is a species of flightless weevil in the subfamily Cryptorhynchinae. The species was described in May 2019 and is named after fictional Star Wars character Yoda, referring to the beetle's small greenish appearance and forest-dwelling nature. The beetle is 2.28–2.73 mm long. It has light reddish-brown antennae, with a slightly darker head and legs. The rest of the body is black with a slight bluish sheen. Endemic to Central Sulawesi, where it is found in the leaf litter of lowland forests at elevations of 170–410 m.

== Taxonomy ==
Trigonopterus yoda was described by the entomologist Alexander Riedel in 2019 on the basis of an adult male specimen collected from near Ampana in Central Sulawesi, Indonesia. The species is named after the fictional Star Wars character Yoda, referring to the beetle's small greenish appearance and forest-dwelling nature.

== Description ==
The beetle is 2.28–2.73 mm long. It has light reddish-brown antennae, with a slightly darker head and legs. The rest of the body is black with a slight bluish sheen. The body is somewhat oval, with a distinct narrowing between the pronotum and elytra when viewed from above, and it appears convex from the side. The base of the rostrum is noticeably bent downward and features lateral flanges in front of the eyes. On top, it has a prominent central ridge (carina) and two submedian ridges, with the grooves between them each containing a row of upright, club-shaped scales. The epistome is indistinct.

The pronotum has a noticeable narrowing near the front sides. Its surface is coarsely punctured except near the base, with net-like spaces between the punctures that are mostly smooth. A faint, smooth central ridge runs down the middle. The elytra have grooves marked by dense rows of small punctures and faint hairlines, with similar rows of punctures in the spaces between. These areas are mostly smooth, with a few short hairs near the tip. The tip of the elytra is nearly straight.

The femora lack notches and have a distinct ridge on the underside. Their front surfaces are coarsely punctured, with each puncture bearing a club-shaped scale. The hind femur has a toothed upper rear edge and a stridulatory patch near the tip. The upper edge of the hind tibia is also toothed. The first two abdominal segments are slightly sunken and mostly smooth, with long, upright, slightly curved setae. The fifth segment is flat, finely textured, and punctured.

In males, the penis has nearly parallel sides and a tip with a central narrowing, bearing a few scattered hairs. The top surface has setae pointing toward the midline. The apodemes are 2.6 times the length of the penis body. The transfer apparatus is thick, flagelliform, S-shaped, and about 1.3 times longer than the penis. The ductus ejaculatorius has a faintly defined bulb at its base.

== Distribution ==
Endemic to Central Sulawesi, where it has been recorded from near Ampana. Found in leaf litter of lowland forests at elevations of 170–410 m.

== See also ==
- List of organisms named after the Star Wars series
