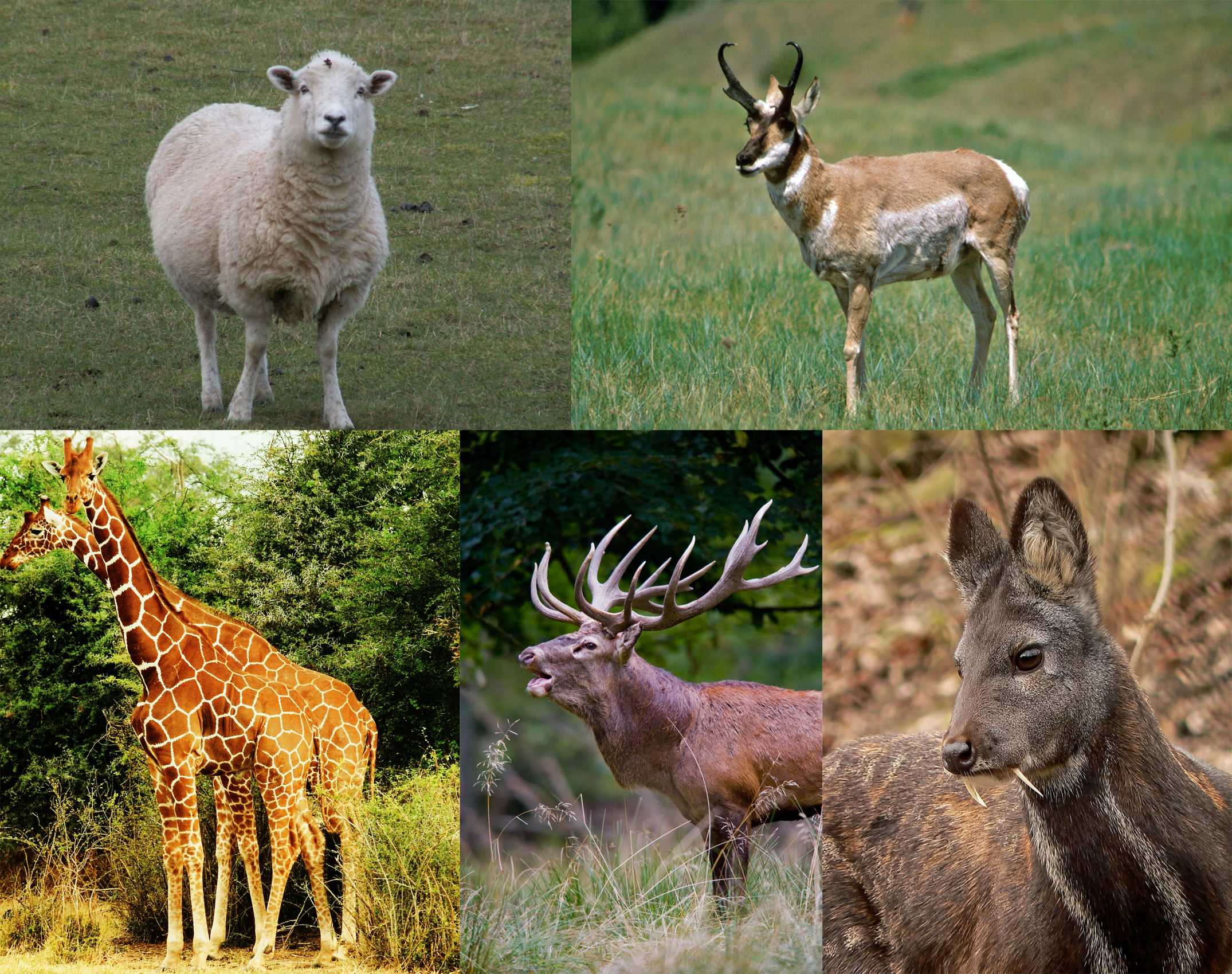

Scientific classification
- Kingdom: Animalia
- Phylum: Chordata
- Class: Mammalia
- Infraclass: Placentalia
- Order: Artiodactyla
- Suborder: Ruminantia
- Infraorder: Pecora; Linnaeus, 1758

Subgroups
- †Dromomerycidae; Antilocapridae; Bovimorpha; Cervoidea; Cervidae; Bovoidea; Bovidae; Moschidae; Giraffomorpha; †Palaeomerycidae; Giraffoidea; Giraffidae; †Climacoceratidae

= Pecora =

Pecora Temporal range: 45–0 Ma Eocene - recent

Infraorder of mammals

Pecora is a clade of even-toed hoofed mammals (Artiodactyla) with ruminant digestion. Most Pecorans have cranial appendages projecting from their frontal bones; only two extant genera lack them, Hydropotes and Moschus. The name "Pecora" comes from Latin pecus, meaning "cattle". Most Pecorans have cranial appendages, but only some of these are true horns, and many scientists believe these appendages did not arise from a common ancestor, but evolved independently at least twice. Likewise, while Pecora as a group is supported by both molecular and morphological studies, morphological support for interrelationships between Pecora families is disputed.

== Evolutionary history ==
The first fossil ruminants appeared in the Early Eocene and were small, likely omnivorous, forest-dwellers. Molecular dating studies estimate that Ruminantia split into the two sister clades Pecora and Tragulina around 45 million years ago (mya), during the Eocene. However, it was not until 15 million years later, at ~30 mya during the Oligocene, that the evolutionary radiation of Pecora began and the five families appeared (Bovidae, Cervidae, Moschidae, Giraffidae, and Antilocapridae).

The appearance of many Pecora fossils in the Miocene suggests that its rapid diversification may correspond to the climate change events of that epoch, as it was a time period when much of Earth's forest habitat was replaced by grassland due to widespread cooling and drying.

The antelopes, giraffids, and pronghorns likely evolved in an open environment; while the cervids, including the caribou, evolved in a woodland habitat. The type of gallop in Pecorans is shown to be closely related to their environment and anatomy; light Pecoran species use both flexed and extended suspensions in their fast gallops. The white-tail and mule-deer have been observed to primarily use the extended suspension, since in this phase of gallop they leap over bushes and logs in their brush environment. However, heavy Pecoran species do not use extended suspension as most have backs that slope downward with shorter hind legs.

== Taxonomy and classification ==
Pecora is a clade within the larger clade Ruminantia, and is the sister taxon to the clade Tragulina (of which Tragulidae is the only surviving family).

Pecora's placement within Artiodactyla can be represented in the following cladogram:

- Artiodactyla
  - Tylopoda (camels)
  - Artiofabula
    - Suina (pigs)
    - Cetruminantia
      - Ruminantia (ruminants)
        - Tragulidae (mouse deer)
        - Pecora (horn bearers)
      - Cetancodonta/Whippomorpha
        - Hippopotamidae (hippopotamuses)
        - Cetacea (whales)

Current attempts to determine the relationships among Pecora families (as well as all artiodactyls) rely on molecular studies, as little consensus exists in morphological studies. Different Pecoran families are recognized as valid by different groups of scientists.^{and sources therein, pp. 4–5}

Until the beginning of the 21st century it was understood that the family Moschidae (musk deer) was sister to Cervidae. However, a 2003 phylogenetic study by Alexandre Hassanin (of National Museum of Natural History, France) and colleagues, based on mitochondrial and nuclear analyses, revealed that Moschidae and Bovidae form a clade sister to Cervidae. According to the study, Cervidae diverged from the Bovidae-Moschidae clade 27 to 28 million years ago. The following cladogram is based on the 2003 study.

- Ruminantia
  - Tragulina
    Tragulidae
  - Pecora
    - Antilocapridae
    - Giraffidae
    - - Cervidae
      - - Bovidae
        - Moschidae

Infraorder Pecora ("horned ruminants", "higher ruminants")

- Incertae sedis
  - Family †Dromomerycidae
  - Family Antilocapridae (pronghorn)
- Parvorder Bovimorpha
  - Superfamily Cervoidea
    - Family Cervidae (deer)
  - Superfamily Bovoidea
    - Family Moschidae (musk deer)
    - Family Bovidae (cattle, goats, sheep, and antelopes)
- Parvorder Giraffomorpha
  - Family †Palaeomerycidae
  - Superfamily Giraffoidea
    - Family Giraffidae (giraffes and okapi)
    - Family †Climacoceratidae

== Anatomy ==
Pecorans share characteristics with other artiodactyls, including a four-chamber stomach, and a paraxonic foot, meaning it supports weight on the third and fourth digits. Several characteristics distinguish Pecora from its sister taxon, Tragulina: an astragalus with parallel sides, a loss of the trapezium, and differences in parts of the skull such as the petrosal bone.

The distinguishing features of most Pecora families are cranial appendages. Most modern Pecorans (with the exception of Moschidae) have one of four types of cranial appendage: horns, antlers, ossicones, or pronghorns.

- True horns have a bone core that is covered in a permanent sheath of keratin. They are indicative of Bovidae. Horns develop in the periosteum over the frontal bone, and can be curved or straight. Surface features on the keratin sheath (e.g., ridges or twists) are thought to be caused by differential rates of growth around the bone core.
- Antlers are bony structures that are shed and replaced each year in members of the family Cervidae. They grow from a permanent outgrowth of the frontal bone called the pedicle. Antlers can be branched, as in the white-tailed deer (Odocoileus virginianus), or palmate, as in the moose (Alces alces).
- Ossicones are permanent bone structures that fuse to the frontal or parietal bones during the lifetime of an animal. They are found only in the Giraffidae and closely related extinct clades, represented in modern animals by the giraffe (Giraffa camelopardalis) and the okapi (Okapia johnstoni).
- Pronghorns are similar to horns in that they have keratinous sheaths covering permanent bone cores; however, these sheaths are deciduous and can be shed like antlers. Very little is known about the development of pronghorns, but they are generally presumed to have evolved independently. The only extant animal with pronghorns is the pronghorn antelope (Antilocapra americana).
