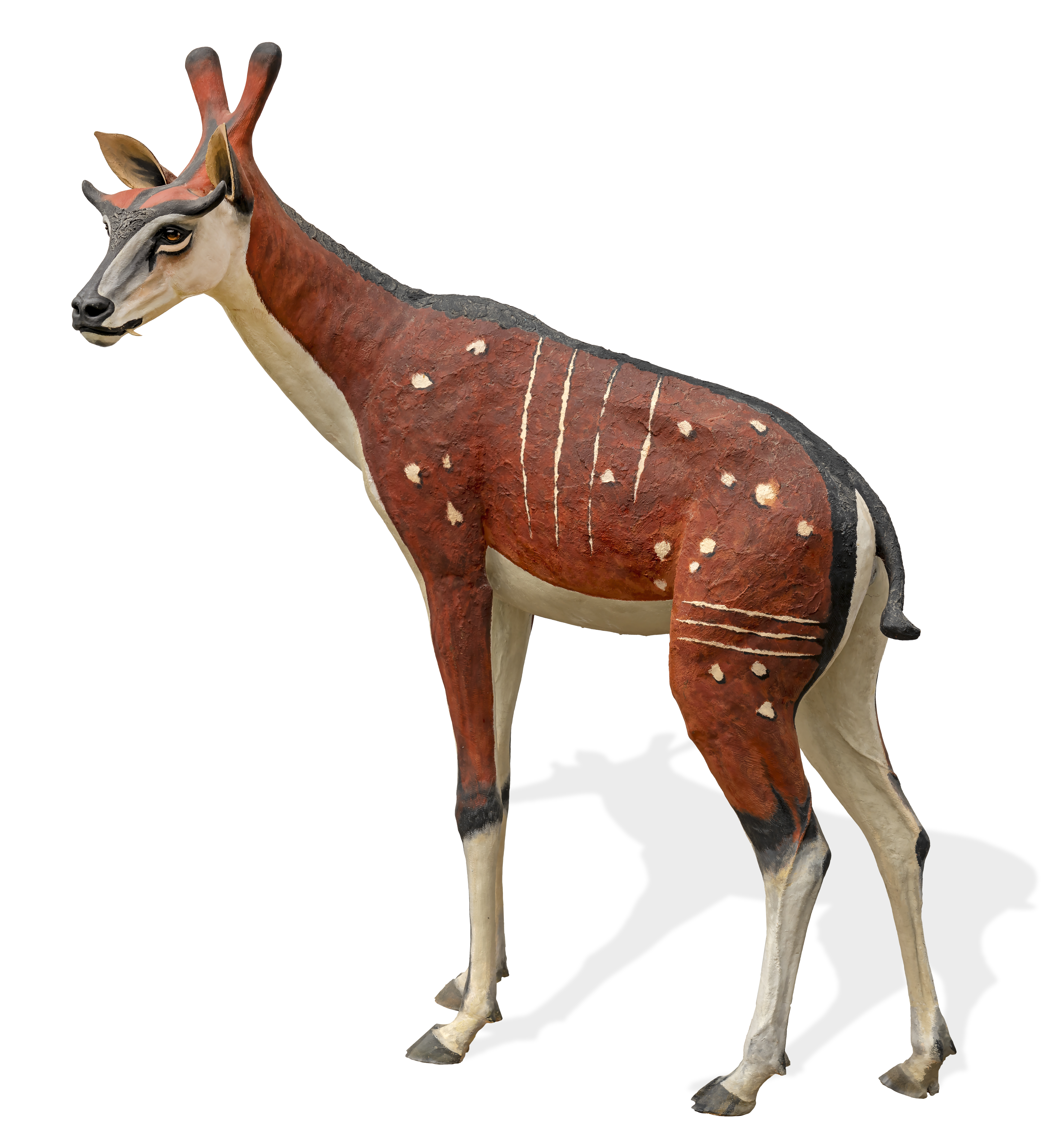
- Reconstruction of Ampelomeryx ginsburgi
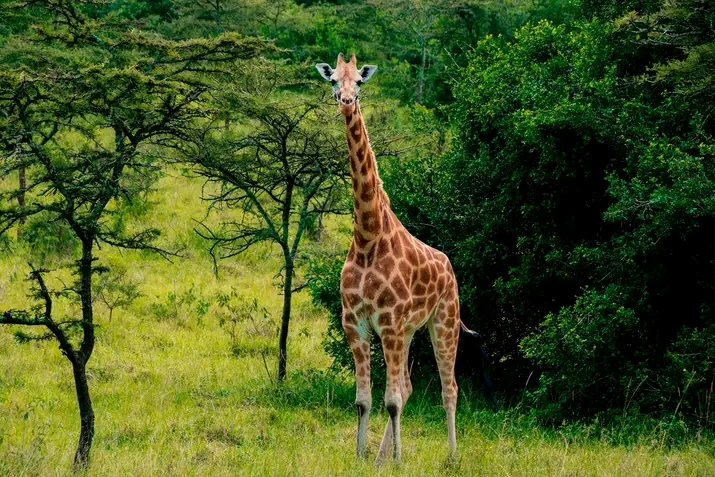
- Giraffe (Giraffa sp.)

Scientific classification
- Kingdom: Animalia
- Phylum: Chordata
- Class: Mammalia
- Order: Artiodactyla
- Infraorder: Pecora
- Clade: Giraffomorpha; Sánchez, Cantalapiedra, Ríos, Quiralte & Morales, 2015

Superfamilies
- Giraffoidea; †Palaeomerycoidea

= Giraffomorpha =

Giraffomorpha Temporal range: Early Miocene–Holocene

Clade of superfamilies of mammals

Giraffomorpha is a clade of pecoran ruminants containing the superfamilies Palaeomerycoidea (Palaeomerycidae) and Giraffoidea (Giraffidae, Prolibytheriidae and Climacoceratidae), of which the giraffe and okapi of the Giraffidae are the only extant members of the once-diverse clade as a result of a decline in diversity after the Miocene as a result of declines in temperatures. The clade is defined by the presence of ossicones, suggesting that the feature was developed as a result of basal, related evolutions between the two superfamilies rather than as an instance of parallel evolution. Giraffomorpha is also characterized by a lack of articular fossettes (hollows) in metatarsal bones III-IV.

The position of the giraffomorphs Propalaeoryx of the Miocene of Africa and the insular Sardomeryx of the Miocene of Sardinia are not completely resolved but are recently suggested to be within the Palaeomerycoidea without being situated within the Palaeomerycidae family itself.
