= Triceromeryx =

Triceromeryx Temporal range: Middle Miocene

Scientific classification
- Domain: Eukaryota
- Kingdom: Animalia
- Phylum: Chordata
- Class: Mammalia
- Order: Artiodactyla
- Family: †Palaeomerycidae
- Genus: †Triceromeryx; Villalta Commela, 1946
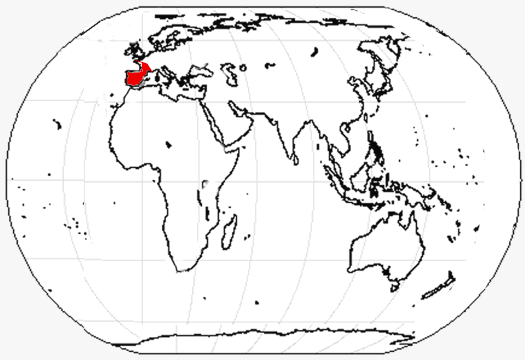
- Range of Triceromeryx based on fossil finds

Extinct genus of deer

Triceromeryx is an extinct genus of Artiodactyla, of the family Palaeomerycidae, endemic to Europe from the middle Miocene epoch, 16.9—16.0 Ma, existing for approximately 0.9 million years.

It was similar to Ampelomeryx, a herbivore.

== Taxonomy ==
Triceromeryx was named by Villalta Commela et al. (1946). It was assigned to Giraffidae by Carroll (1988); and to Palaeomerycinae by Prothero and Liter (2007).

== Fossil distribution ==
- Cetina de Aragon, Zaragoza, Spain
