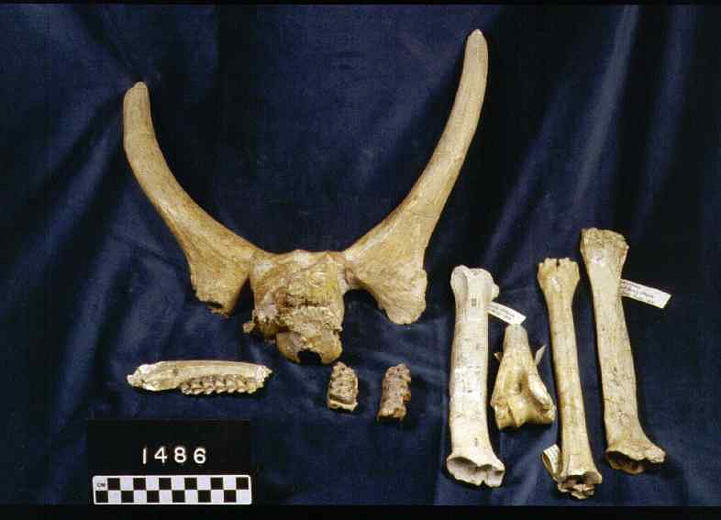
- Dromomeryx borealis fossils

Scientific classification
- Domain: Eukaryota
- Kingdom: Animalia
- Phylum: Chordata
- Class: Mammalia
- Order: Artiodactyla
- Family: †Dromomerycidae
- Subfamily: †Dromomerycinae
- Genus: †Dromomeryx; Douglass, 1909

= Dromomeryx =

Dromomeryx Temporal range: Miocene

Extinct genus of mammals

Dromomeryx is an extinct genus of Artiodactyla, of the family Dromomerycidae, endemic to North America.

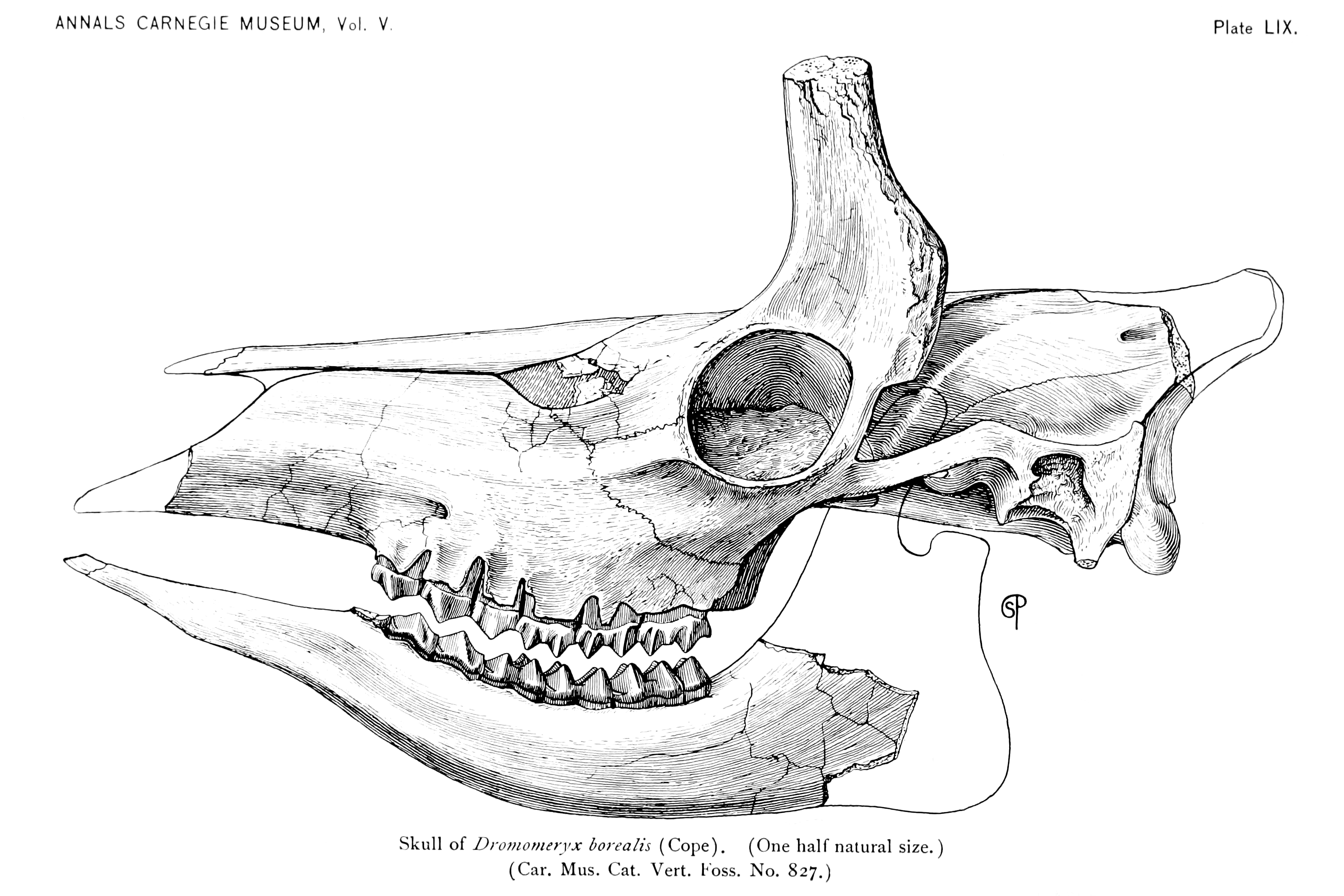
D. borealis skull

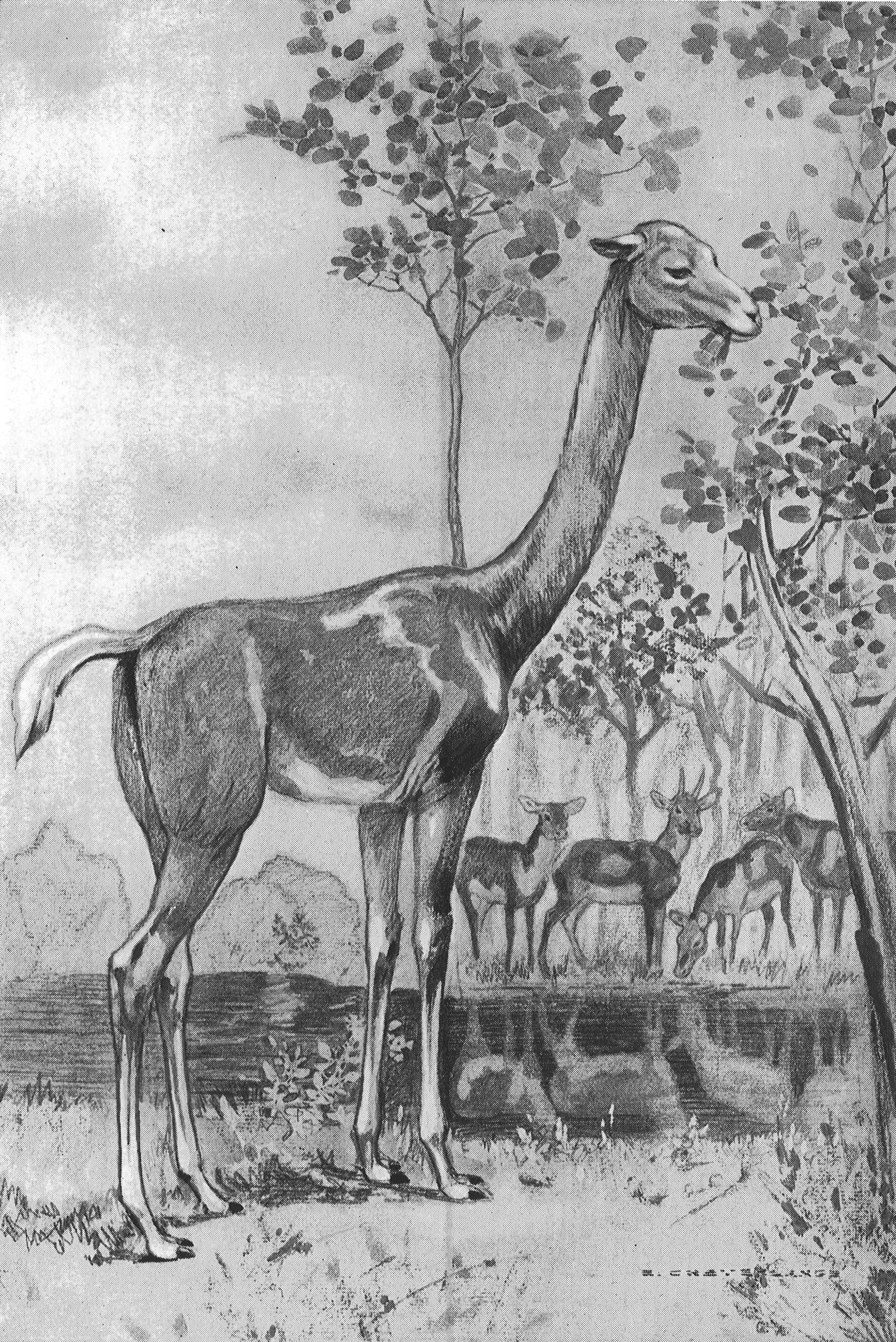
Restoration of Aepycamelus and Dromomeryx (background)
