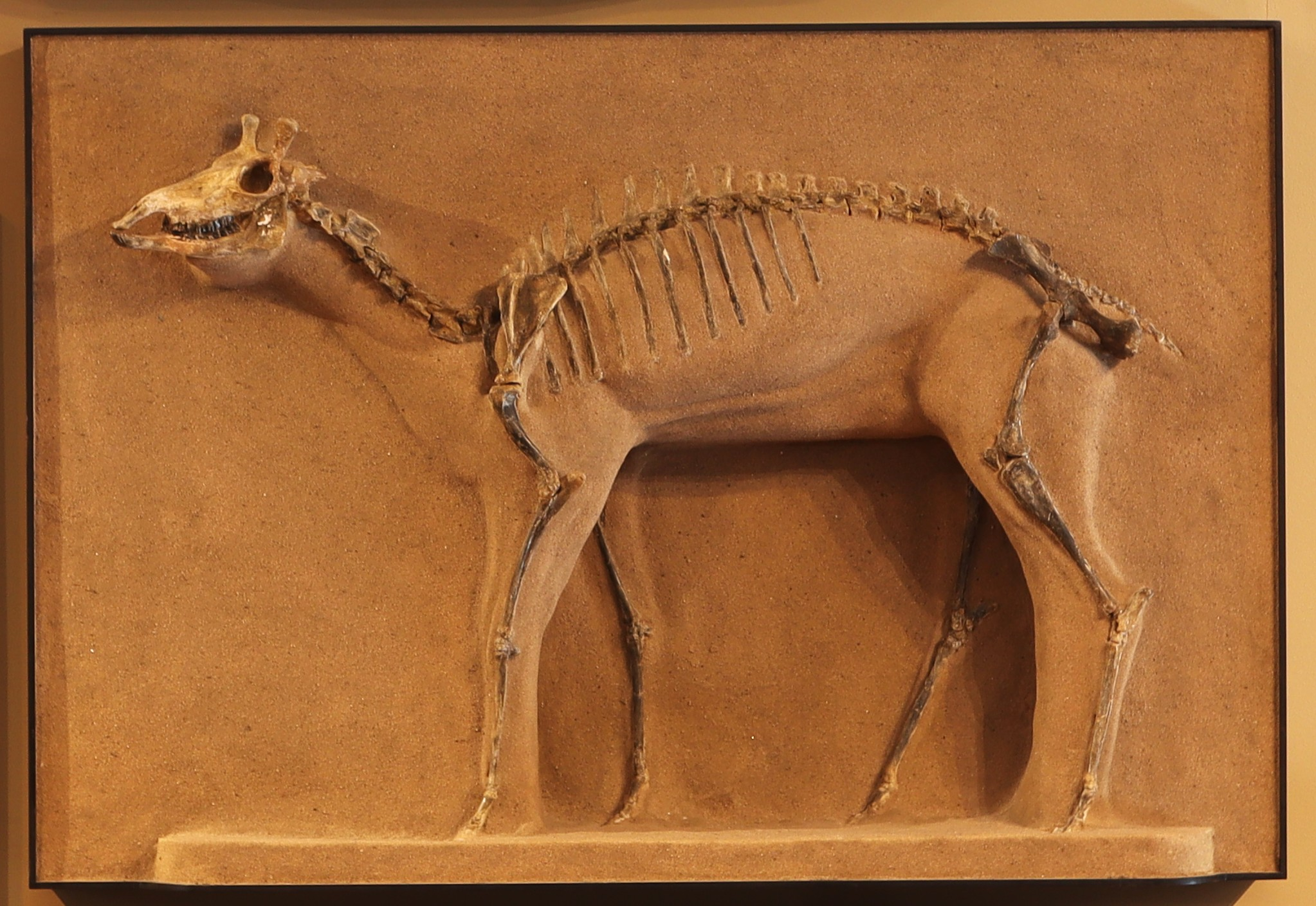
- Skeletal mount, Beneski Museum of Natural History

Scientific classification
- Kingdom: Animalia
- Phylum: Chordata
- Class: Mammalia
- Order: Artiodactyla
- Family: †Dromomerycidae
- Tribe: †Aletomerycini
- Genus: †Aletomeryx; Lull (1920)

Species
- A. gracilis; A. marslandensis; A. occidentalis

= Aletomeryx =

Aletomeryx Temporal range: 20.6–16.3 Ma

Extinct genus of mammals

Aletomeryx is an extinct genus of Artiodactyla, of the family Dromomerycidae, endemic to North America from the early Miocene epoch (Hemingfordian stage) 20.6—16.3 Ma, existing for approximately 4.3 million years.

== Taxonomy ==
Female skull, originally described as Blastomeryx marshi (now a synonym of Aletomeryx gracilis).

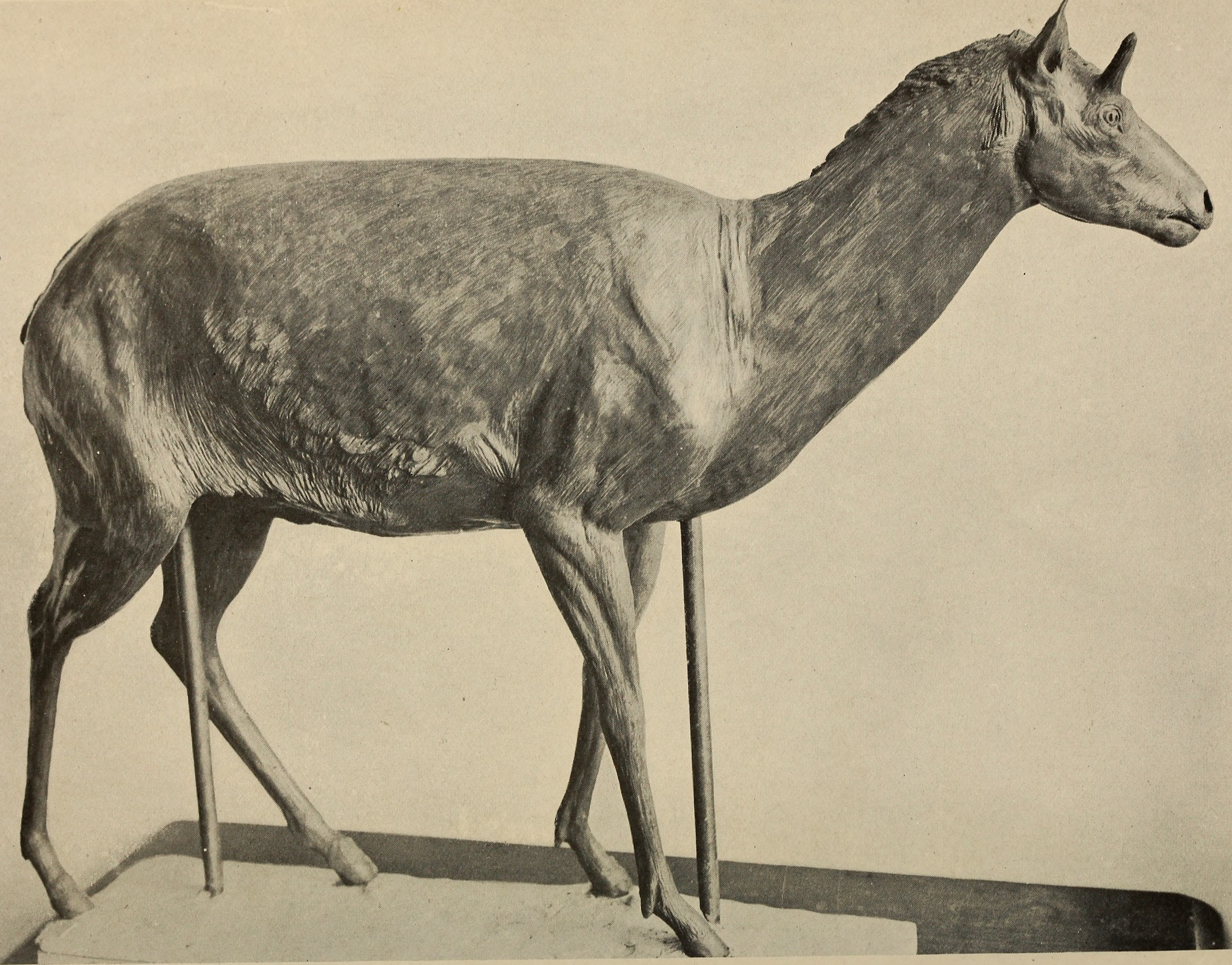
19th century model

Aletomeryx was named by Lull (1920). It is the type genus of Aletomerycinae, Aletomerycini. It was assigned to Dromomerycidae by Lull (1920) and Janis and Manning (1998); and to Aletomerycini by Prothero and Liter (2007).

== Fossil distribution ==
Fossils have been recovered from the Midway Site in Florida, Saskatchewan, Boron, California, and several sites in Nebraska and Wyoming.
