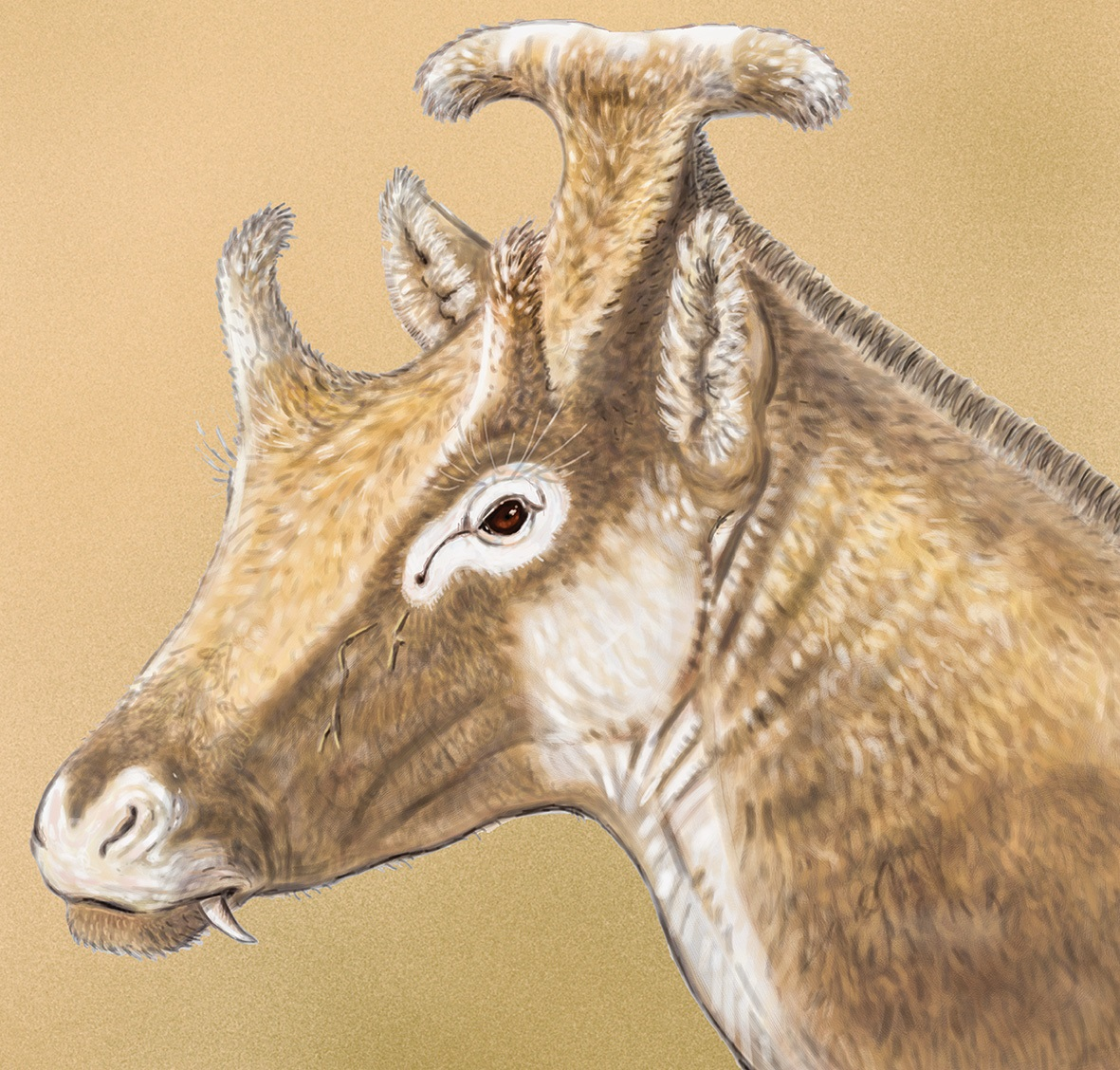
- Life restoration of X. amidalae

Scientific classification
- Kingdom: Animalia
- Phylum: Chordata
- Class: Mammalia
- Order: Artiodactyla
- Family: †Palaeomerycidae
- Genus: †Xenokeryx; Sánchez et al, 2015

Type species
- Xenokeryx amidalae Sánchez et al, 2015

Synonyms
- Triceromeryx conquensis

= Xenokeryx =

Xenokeryx Temporal range: 15 Ma Miocene

Extinct genus of mammals

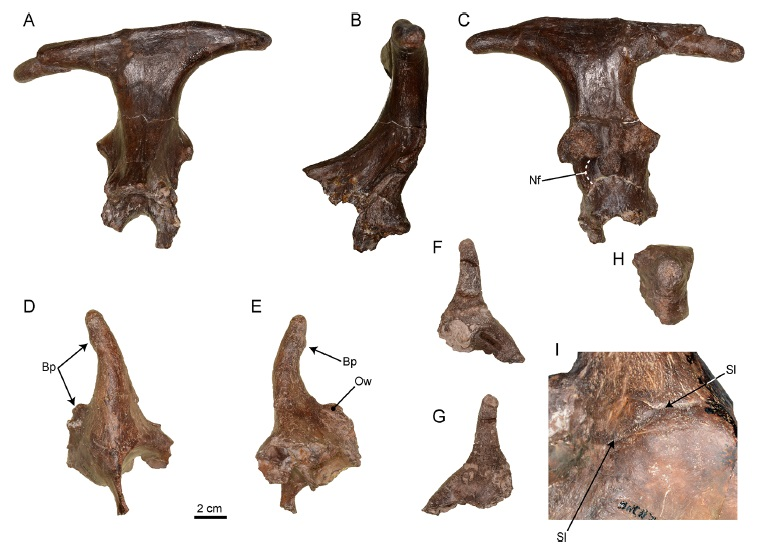
Xenokeryx cranial fossils

Xenokeryx ("strange horn" in Greek) is an extinct genus of ruminant known from the Miocene of Europe. The type species, Xenokeryx amidalae, was recovered from central Spain and bears a unique T-shaped protrusion from the top of the head. The specific epithet amidalae is in reference to the character Padmé Amidala from the Star Wars films "due to the striking resemblance that the occipital appendage of Xenokeryx bears to one of the hairstyles that the aforementioned character shows in The Phantom Menace feature film."
