= Zitai Formation =

Ordovician formation in China

- Stratigraphic range: Floian-Dapingian; ~478–468 Ma
- Type: Geological formation

Lithology
- Primary: Limestone

Location
- Coordinates: 30.3°N 117.4°E
- Approximate paleocoordinates: 8.7°N 134.3°W
- Region: Anhui, Hubei, Hunan
- Country: China
- Zitai Formation (China)

The Zitai or Zhitai Formation is a geological sequence of Middle Ordovician origin, that occurs along the southeastern edge of the Yangtze Platform in southern China. It is a purple-red limestone with a few interspersed yellow-green shale beds. It contains a fossil fauna dominated by trilobites and nautiloids.
