= Epicratinus =

Scientific classification
- Kingdom: Animalia
- Phylum: Arthropoda
- Subphylum: Chelicerata
- Class: Arachnida
- Order: Araneae
- Infraorder: Araneomorphae
- Family: Zodariidae
- Genus: Epicratinus; Jocqué & Baert, 2005

Type species
- Epicratinus amazonicus Jocqué & Baert, 2005

Species
- 25, see text

Genus of spiders

Epicratinus is a genus of spiders in the family Zodariidae. It was first described in 2005 by Jocqué & Baert.

== Species ==
As of October 2025 it contains twenty five species, found in South America:

- Epicratinus amazonicus Jocqué & Baert, 2005 (type) – Brazil
- Epicratinus anakin Gonçalves & Brescovit, 2020 – Brazil
- Epicratinus arlequina Gonçalves & Brescovit, 2024 – Brazil
- Epicratinus baraka Gonçalves & Brescovit, 2024 – Brazil
- Epicratinus dookan Gonçalves & Brescovit, 2020 – Brazil
- Epicratinus ehonda Gonçalves & Brescovit, 2020 – Brazil
- Epicratinus leia Gonçalves & Brescovit, 2024 – Brazil
- Epicratinus luke Gonçalves & Brescovit, 2024 – Brazil
- Epicratinus maozinha Gonçalves & Brescovit, 2024 – Brazil
- Epicratinus mauru Gonçalves & Brescovit, 2020 – Brazil
- Epicratinus omegarugal Gonçalves & Brescovit, 2020 – Brazil
- Epicratinus pegasus Gonçalves & Brescovit, 2020 – Brazil
- Epicratinus perfidus (Jocqué & Baert, 2002) – Bolivia, Brazil
- Epicratinus petropolitanus (Mello-Leitão, 1922) – Brazil
- Epicratinus pikachu Gonçalves & Brescovit, 2020 – Brazil
- Epicratinus pugionifer Jocqué & Baert, 2005 – Brazil
- Epicratinus raiden Gonçalves & Brescovit, 2024 – Brazil
- Epicratinus smeagol Gonçalves & Brescovit, 2024 – Brazil
- Epicratinus stitch Gonçalves & Brescovit, 2020 – Brazil
- Epicratinus takutu Jocqué & Baert, 2005 – Guyana, Brazil
- Epicratinus temuerai Gonçalves & Brescovit, 2024 – Brazil
- Epicratinus vader Gonçalves & Brescovit, 2020 – Brazil
- Epicratinus yoda Gonçalves & Brescovit, 2024 – Brazil
- Epicratinus zangief Gonçalves & Brescovit, 2020 – Brazil
- Epicratinus zelda Gonçalves & Brescovit, 2020 – Brazil
