= Pediomeryx =

Pediomeryx Temporal range: Late Miocene–Early Pliocene ~10.3–4.9 Ma

Scientific classification
- Kingdom: Animalia
- Phylum: Chordata
- Class: Mammalia
- Order: Artiodactyla
- Family: †Dromomerycidae
- Tribe: †Cranioceratini
- Genus: †Pediomeryx; Stirton, 1936

Species
- P. figginsi; P. hamiltoni; P. hemphillensis; P. ruminalis
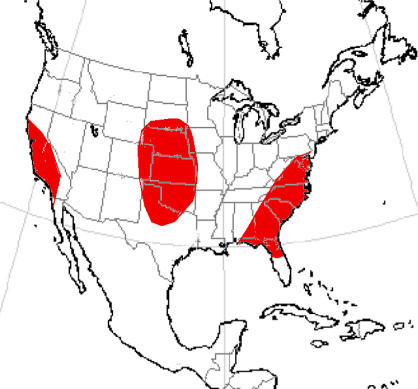
- Range of Pediomeryx based on fossil distribution

Extinct genus of deer

Pediomeryx is an extinct genus of artiodactyl, of the family Dromomerycidae, endemic to North America. It lived during the Late Miocene Early Pliocene 10.3—4.9 Ma, existing for approximately 5 million years. Fossils have been recovered from the Midway Site in Florida, the Gray Fossil Site in northeast Tennessee, several sites in Nebraska and Wyoming, Saskatchewan, and Boron, California.

== Description ==
They were comparable in size to red deer, with most specimens weighing 100–200 kg but surpassing 400 kg in the case of P. figginsi.

== Palaeoecology ==
Dental mesowear and enamel δ^{13}C from the Optima site in Oklahoma suggest that P. hemphillensis was a mixed feeder that predominantly fed on C_{3} plants, while at the Coffee Ranch site in Texas, about a fifth of the individuals were found to be non-strict grazers and the rest mixed feeders.
