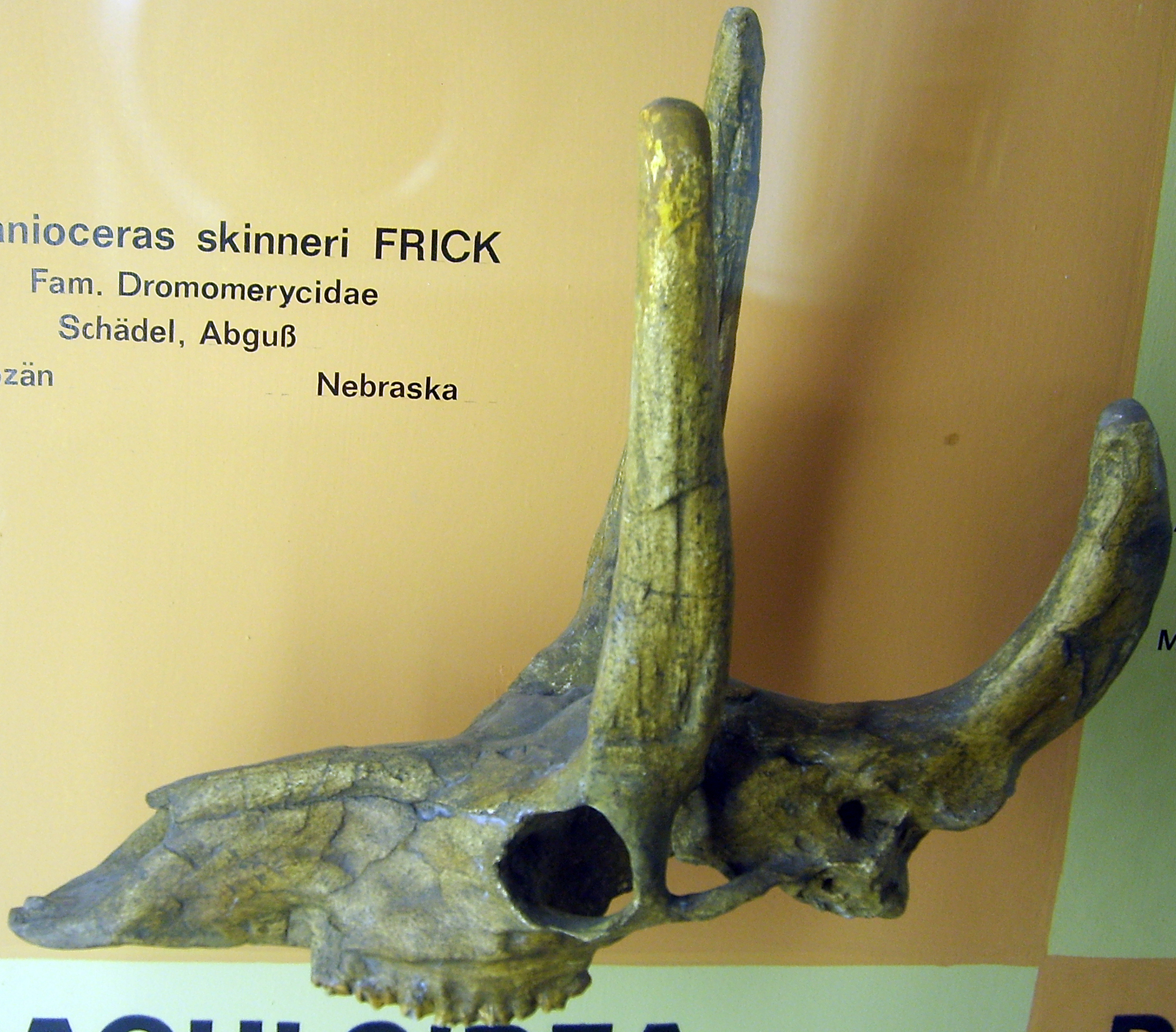
- Procranioceras skinneri skull at the Museum für Naturkunde, Berlin

Scientific classification
- Kingdom: Animalia
- Phylum: Chordata
- Class: Mammalia
- Infraclass: Placentalia
- Order: Artiodactyla
- Infraorder: Pecora
- Family: †Dromomerycidae; Frick, 1937

Type genus
- †Dromomeryx Douglass, 1909

Subfamilies
- †Dromomerycinae †Aletomerycinae

= Dromomerycidae =

Dromomerycidae Temporal range: Early Miocene–Early Pliocene

Extinct family of pecorans

Dromomerycidae is an extinct family of Neogene ruminants belonging to the infraorder Pecora. Dromomerycids, known by two subfamilies, were endemic to North America from the later early Miocene up to the early Pliocene (~5 Ma), leaving no descendants. Dromomerycidae has a long history of uncertain taxonomic affiliations due to its superficial resemblances with the Eurasian Neogene Palaeomerycidae and were traditionally classified as subfamilies within the family. However, recent research differentiates the dromomerycids from the Giraffomorpha (Giraffoidea and Palaeomerycoidea) by the lack of sutures on the skull roof that typically make up the ossicones of the later clade. The similar resemblances of the appendages therefore could be the result of parallel evolution.

Dromomerycids are characterized by unbranched and nondeciduous appendages above the orbits of the eyes. These traits may have been typically characteristic of males but appear to have been present in both sexes of Aletomeryx. Little is known about them, however, since they very rarely are studied in the paleontological record. Dromomerycids may have been dense woodland and open bushlands/grasslands dwellers that mainly browsed on non-grass vegetation. Their gradual decline seems to have been the result of disappearances of suitable habitats as a result of increasing aridity and cooling climates.

== Classification ==
- Dromomerycinae
  - Dromomerycini
    - Dromomeryx
    - Rakomeryx
    - Drepanomeryx
  - Cranioceratini
    - Cranioceras
    - Barbouromeryx
    - Bouromeryx
    - Procranioceras
    - Pediomeryx
- Aletomerycinae
  - Aletomeryx
  - Diabolocornis
  - Sinclairomeryx
  - Surameryx
