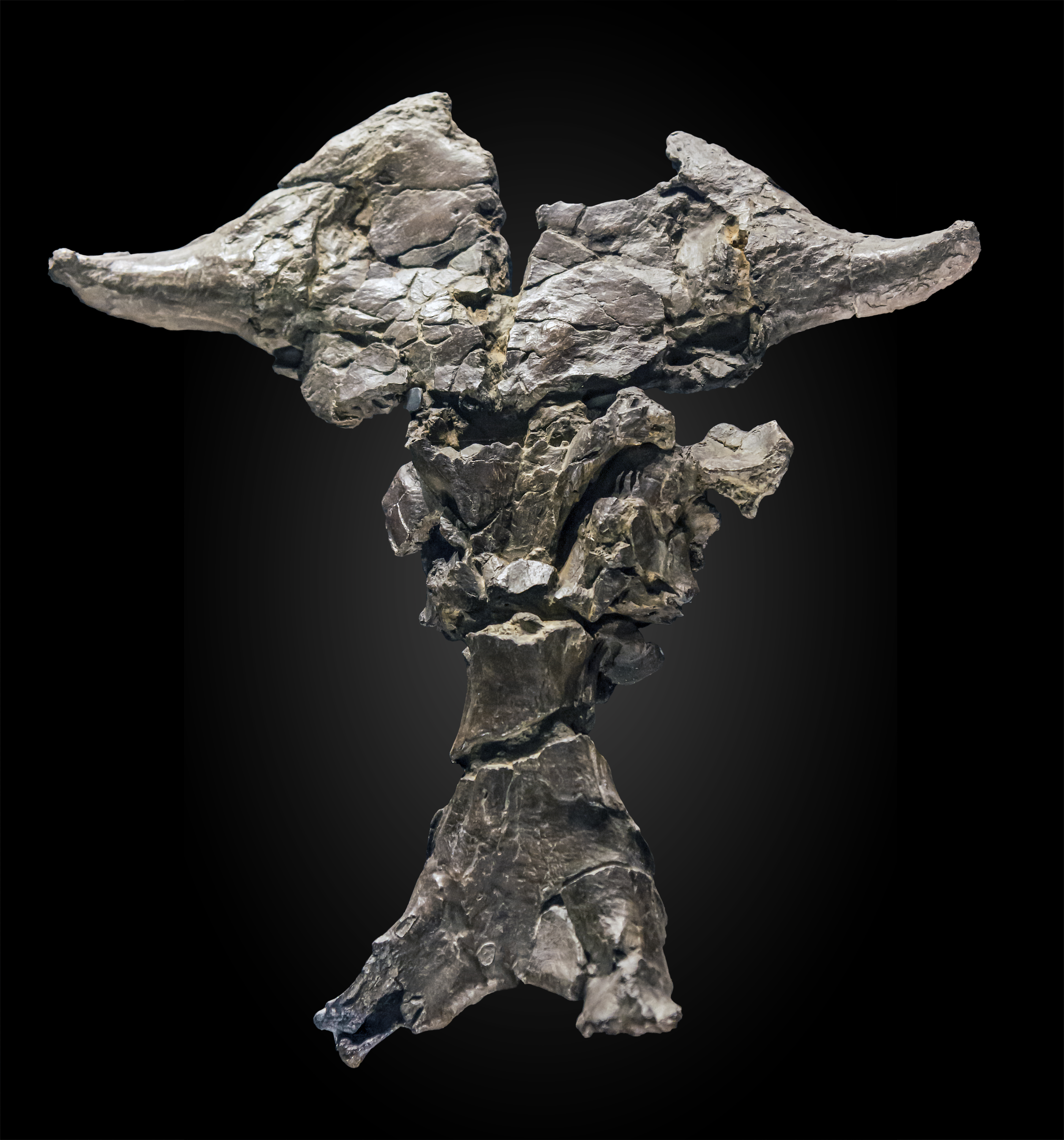
- Ampelomeryx ginsburgi Paratype
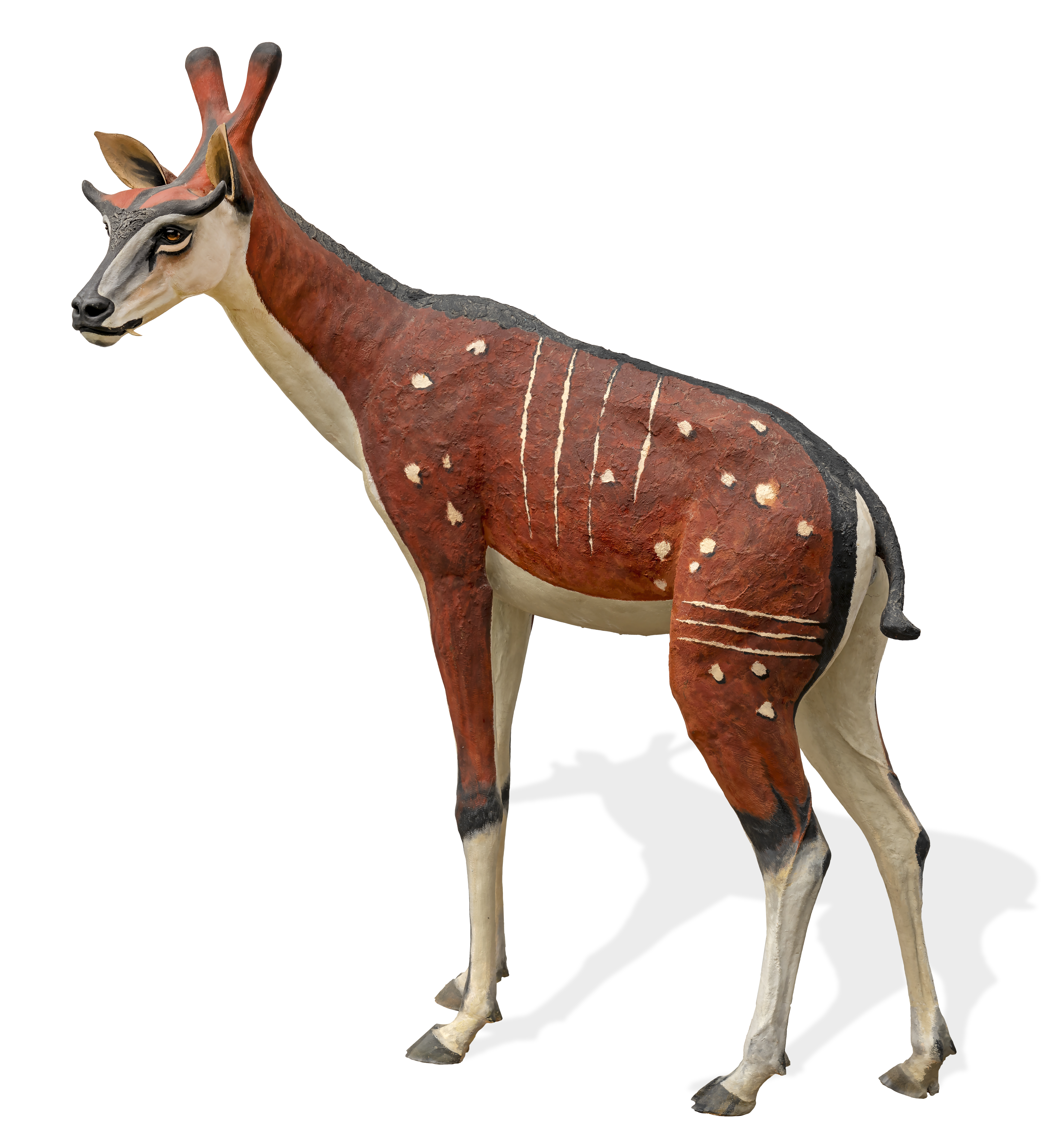
- Ampelomeryx ginsburgi full-size 3D reconstruction

Scientific classification
- Kingdom: Animalia
- Phylum: Chordata
- Class: Mammalia
- Order: Artiodactyla
- Family: †Palaeomerycidae
- Genus: †Ampelomeryx; Duranthon et al. (1995)

= Ampelomeryx =

Ampelomeryx Temporal range: Miocene

Extinct genus of ungulate

Ampelomeryx is a genus of extinct herbivorous even-toed ungulate mammals belonging to the family Palaeomerycidae.

Ampelomeryx was named by Duranthon et al. (1995). It was assigned to the Palaeomerycinae by Prothero and Liter (2007). It had frontal and occipital appendages. It was similar to Tauromeryx and Triceromeryx.

== Palaeobiology ==
=== Life history ===
Osteohistology indicates that Ampelomeryx ginsburgi reached skeletal maturity at three years of age.
