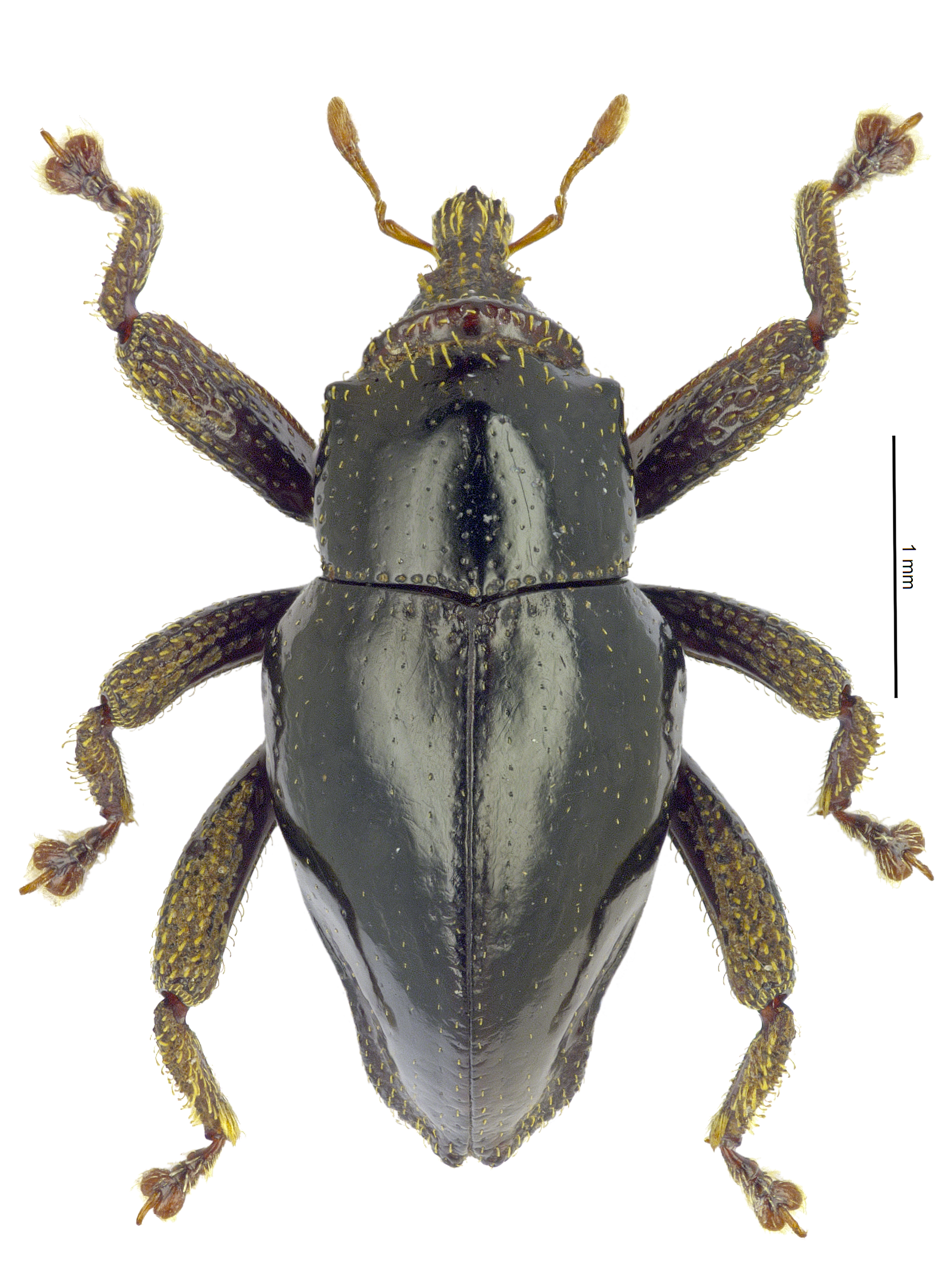

Scientific classification
- Domain: Eukaryota
- Kingdom: Animalia
- Phylum: Arthropoda
- Class: Insecta
- Order: Coleoptera
- Suborder: Polyphaga
- Infraorder: Cucujiformia
- Family: Curculionidae
- Genus: Trigonopterus
- Species: T. chewbacca

Binomial name
- Trigonopterus chewbacca Van Dam, Laufa and Ridel, 2016

= Trigonopterus chewbacca =

Species of beetle

Trigonopterus chewbacca is a species of flightless weevil in the genus Trigonopterus from Papua New Guinea.

== Etymology ==
The specific name is derived from a parallel being drawn between the dense scales on the head and legs of this species, and the Star Wars character Chewbacca.
