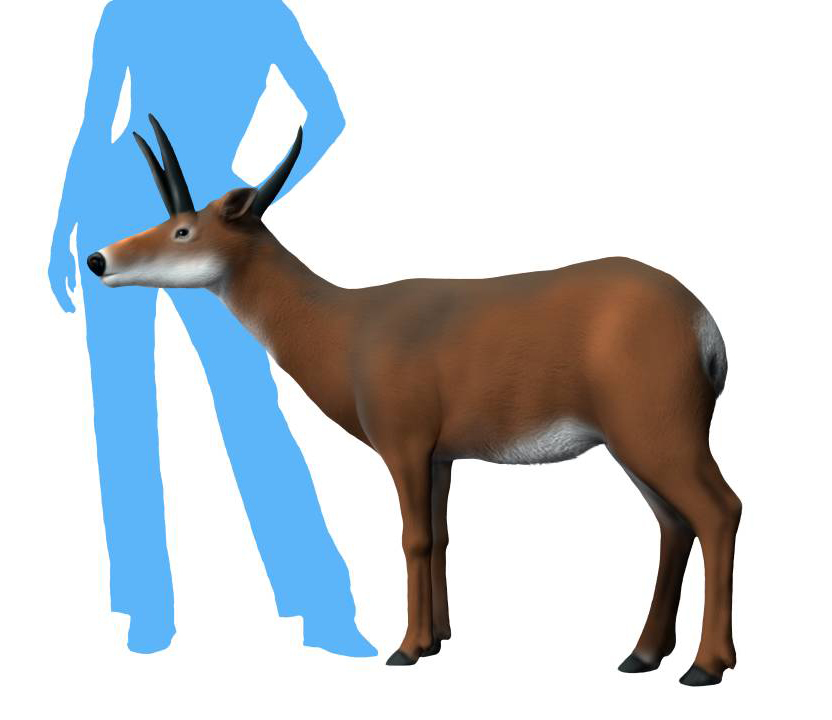
- Life restoration of Cranioceras unicornis

Scientific classification
- Kingdom: Animalia
- Phylum: Chordata
- Class: Mammalia
- Order: Artiodactyla
- Family: †Dromomerycidae
- Tribe: †Cranioceratini
- Genus: †Cranioceras; Matthew, 1918

Species
- †C. unicornis Matthew, 1918(type); †C. clarendonensis Frick, 1937; †C. pawniensis Frick, 1937; †C. teres (Cope, 1874)

= Cranioceras =

Cranioceras Temporal range: Barstovian–Hemphillian ~15.97–5.3 Ma

Extinct genus of artiodactyl

Cranioceras is an extinct genus of artiodactyl from the Miocene to the Pliocene in the United States.

== Sources ==
- After the Dinosaurs: The Age of Mammals (Life of the Past) by Donald R. Prothero
- The Book of Life: An Illustrated History of the Evolution of Life on Earth, Second Edition by Stephen Jay Gould
