= Polynoe =

In Greek mythology, Polynoe (Ancient Greek: Πουλυνόη, romanized: Poulynóē) was one of the 50 Nereids, marine-nymph daughters of the 'Old Man of the Sea' Nereus and the Oceanid Doris. Her name means 'giver of reason' or 'richness of mind, thoughtful'.
