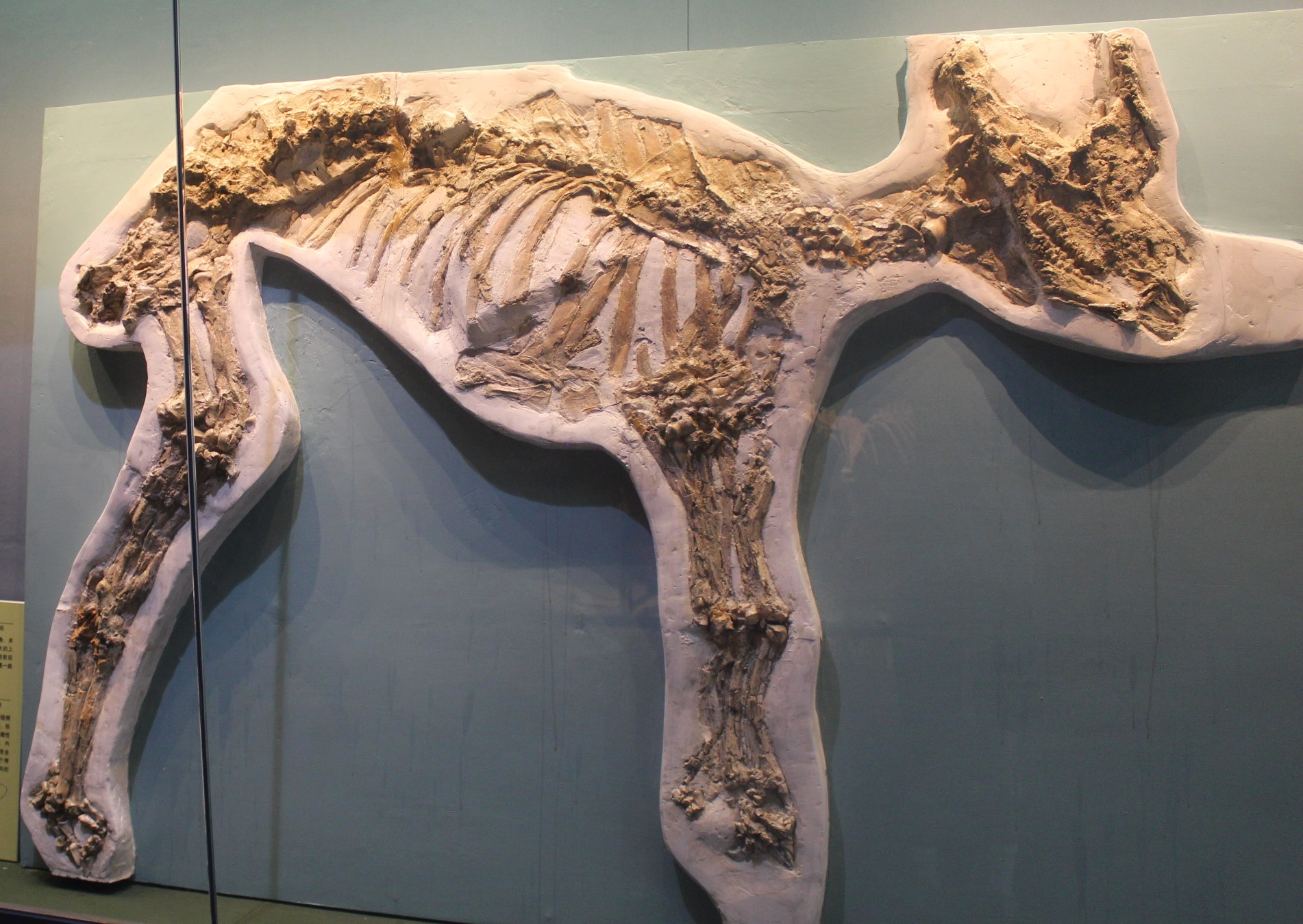
- Palaeomeryx, Tianjin Natural History Museum

Scientific classification
- Kingdom: Animalia
- Phylum: Chordata
- Class: Mammalia
- Order: Artiodactyla
- Infraorder: Pecora
- Clade: Giraffomorpha
- Superfamily: †Palaeomerycoidea; Ríos, Sánchez & Morales, 2017
- Family: †Palaeomerycidae; Lydekker, 1883

Type genus
- Palaeomeryx von Meyer, 1834

Genera
- See text

= Palaeomerycidae =

Palaeomerycidae Temporal range: Early Miocene–Late Miocene

Extinct family of pecorans

The Palaeomerycidae is an extinct family of Neogene ruminants belonging to the infraorder Pecora. Palaeomerycids lived in Europe and Asia exclusively during the Miocene, coevolving with cervids, bovids, moschids, and tragulids there as part of a dramatic radiation of ruminants by the early Miocene.

Dromomerycids are sometimes considered to be a subfamily of the Palaeomerycidae, but recent research has cast doubt on this, arguing that the dromomerycids lack the sutures on the skull roof that giraffomorphs (Giraffidae, Palaeomerycidae, Climacoceratidae) have for ossicone features. The resemblances between the two families could be the result of parallel evolution.

== Description ==
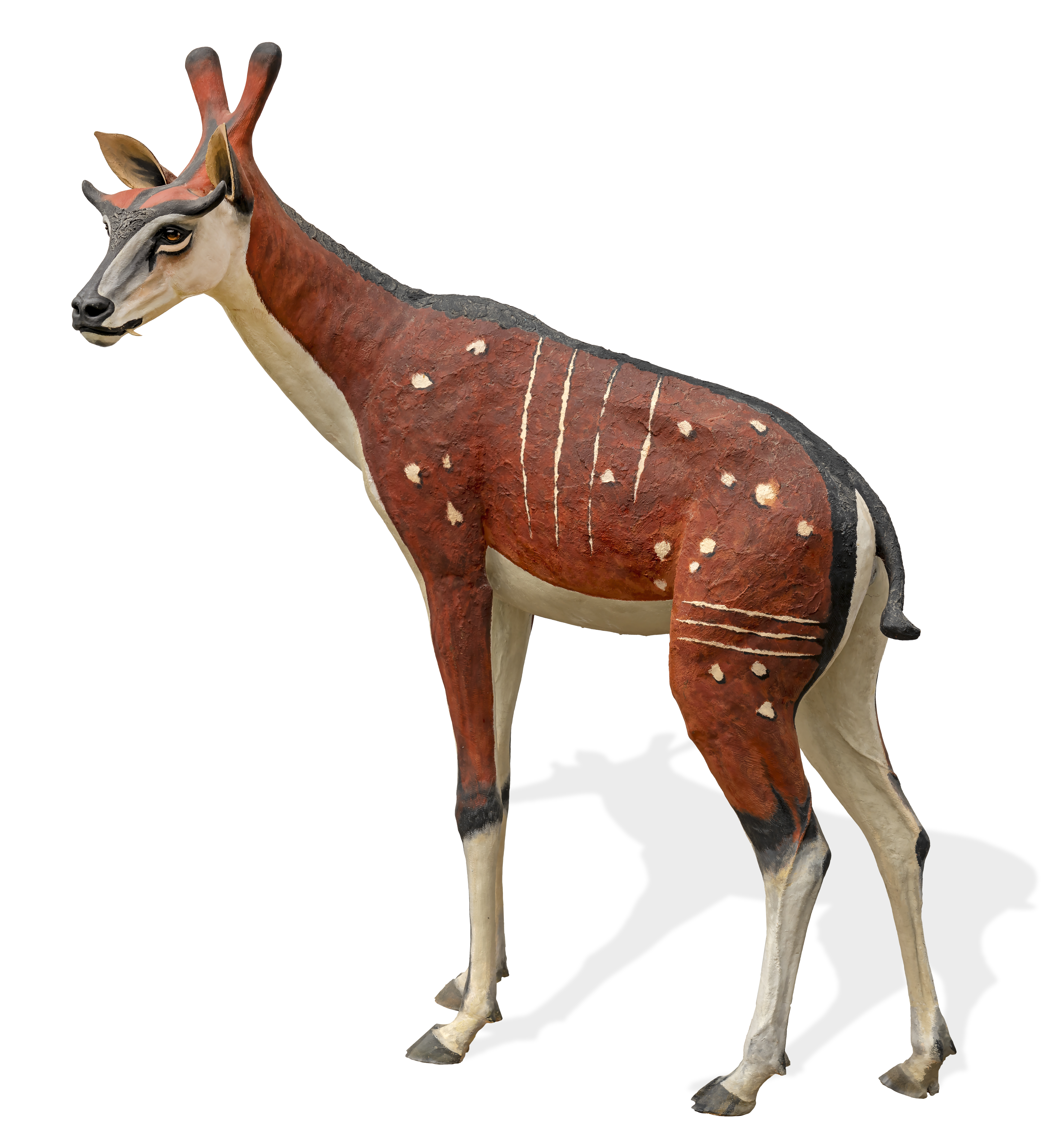
Reconstruction of Ampelomeryx ginsburgi

Palaeomerycids were a group of horned, long-legged and massive ruminants that could attain a weight of 350 to 500 kg (770 to 1,100 lb).

One of the first known members of this group, Palaeomeryx, was thought to be a hornless form distantly related to the Giraffidae before paleontologist Miguel Crusafont found remains of Triceromeryx in middle Miocene Spain. This Palaeomeryx-like form carried two ossicones over its orbits that were straight and short, similar to those of true giraffids. However, the most striking feature of Triceromeryx was the third, Y-shaped appendage that prolonged the occipital bone at the back of the skull. Discoveries during the 1980s and 1990s showed a surprising variety in these occipital appendages.

Ampelomeryx, a genus of palaeomerycids found at the early Miocene sites of Els Casots, Valles-Penedes Basin, Spain, and Montréal-du-Gers, Gers, France, had a three-horned system of appendages similar to those of Triceromeryx. These appendages were, however, quite different, with the paired appendages extending laterally over the orbits, flat and wide, forming an eye-shade, while the third spectacular posterior appendage was about 20 cm (7.9 in) long.

Another species of Triceromeryx, T. conquensis found in La Retama in Spain, showed an even more spectacular appendage — instead of a Y-shaped structure, its posterior appendage was T-shaped with the lateral branches expanding toward the front.

In primitive members of the group (e.g. Ampelomeryx), this appendage was a posterior expansion of the occipital bone lying close to the powerful muscles supporting the skull in a normal position, thus suggesting that this appendage was actually used for fighting between males during the breeding season. The reduced shapes of the flat and laterally oriented appendages of later species suggests that these were not used in active fighting, instead forming a function of passive display.

As a group, the palaeomerycids appear to have formed a successful part of an independent radiation of horned ruminants that diversified into a variety of forms during the early to middle Miocene, with a geographic range reaching from Spain to China.

== Taxonomy ==
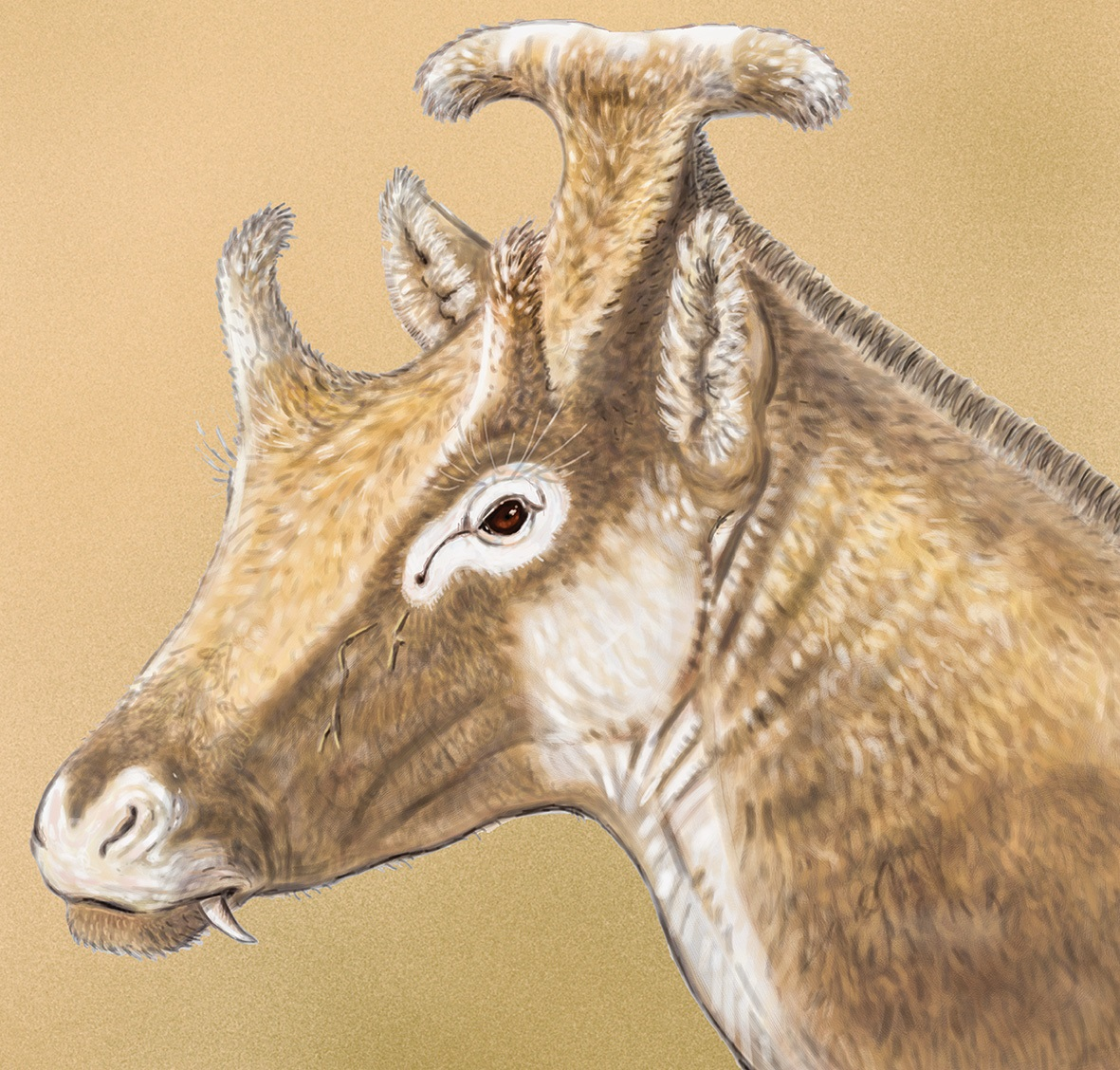
Xenokeryx restoration

The Palaeomerycidae were named by Lydekker (1883). The type genus is Palaeomeryx. The family was assigned to the Artiodactyla by Hulbert and Whitmore (2006), and to Cervoidea by Carroll (1988), Sach and Heizmann (2001) and Prothero and Liter (2007).

== Classification ==
- Palaeomerycinae
  - Ampelomeryx
  - Palaeomeryx
  - Triceromeryx
  - Xenokeryx
  - Tauromeryx
