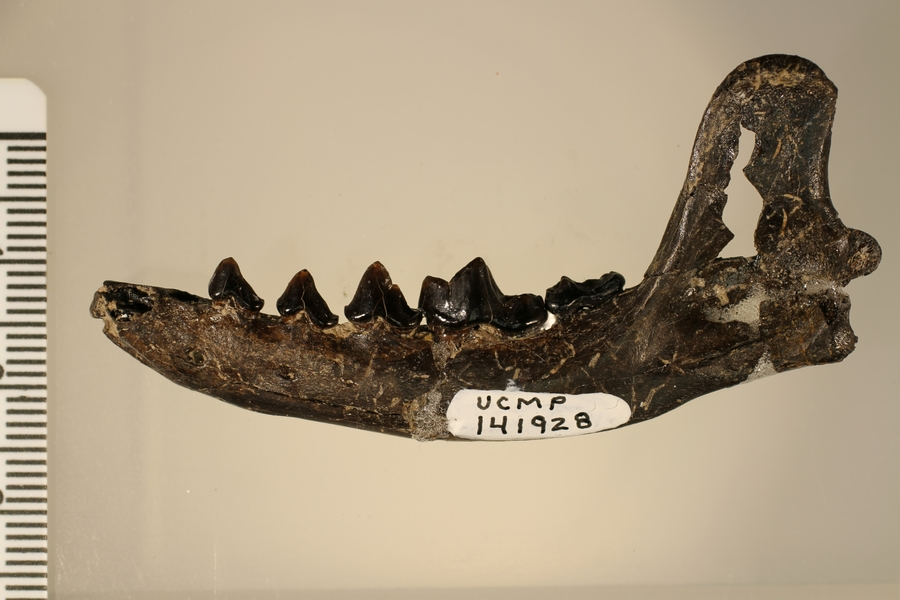
- Part of the holotype (name-bearing specimen) of Actiocyon parverratis

Scientific classification
- Kingdom: Animalia
- Phylum: Chordata
- Class: Mammalia
- Order: Carnivora
- Family: Ailuridae
- Genus: †Actiocyon; Stock, 1947

Type species
- Actiocyon leardi Stock, 1947

Other species
- A. parverratis Smith et al., 2016

= Actiocyon =

Actiocyon Temporal range: Barstovian to early Clarendonian (18–8.4 mya)

Extinct genus of carnivorans

Actiocyon is an extinct genus of ailurid mammal that lived in western North America during the Middle Miocene. It was named by Chester Stock in 1947 for the species Actiocyon leardi. A second species, Actiocyon parverratis, was described in 2016. A. leardi is only known from one specimen, while A. parverratis is known from three specimens.

Both species of Actiocyon were small carnivores, with A. leardi known to have lived in a coastal environment while A. parverratis lived in a high-altitude temperate forest. They differ from the closely-related European genus Alopecocyon in the characteristics of the teeth, and from Simocyon in their overall smaller size. A. leardi may have weighed about 7 kilograms (15 lb), while A. parverratis was somewhat smaller.

== History and taxonomy ==
In 1938 Robert Leard collected mammalian fossils in Ventura County, California for the California Institute of Technology. Among them was a partial carnivoran skull which was identified as a new genus of canid. American paleontologist Chester Stock in 1947 described the new genus and species Actiocyon leardi based on the specimen. The fossil was found in rocks of the Caliente Formation. The genus name comes from the Greek aktlos, meaning 'pertaining to the coast', and κύων/kúon, meaning 'dog'. The specific name honored Leard for collecting the specimen.

The second species Actiocyon parverratis was described by paleontologists Smith, Czaplewski, and Cifelli in 2016 based on fossils from the lowermost section of the Monarch Mill Formation in Middlegate Basin, Nevada. The specific name comes from the Latins words parvus 'small', and erratis 'wanderer', together meaning 'small wanderer'.

=== Classification ===
When Stock described A. leardi in 1947, he considered it a close relative of Alopecocyon, at the time considered a canid, and called it an aberrant genus that had acquired procyonid traits. Webb, in his 1969 work on Pliocene canids, considered Actiocyon a junior synonym of the Alopecocyon, though he noted that De Beaumont had suggested in 1964 that Alopecocyon was a musteloid descended from Broiliana and the lack of material made its position difficult to resolve.

Jon Baskin, while writing a book chapter on Procyonidae in 1998, listed Actiocyon as closely related but distinct from Alopecocyon, and included both in the clade Simocyoninae, itself in the clade Baskin called "Ailuridae or Unnamed Group" that he stated was controversially placed in Procyonidae.

In 2010, paleontologists Michael Morlo and Stéphane Peigné published a review of what they stated was the family Ailuridae, in which they included A. leardi as a species of Alopecocyon in the subfamily Simocyoninae. The 2016 description of A. parverratis unambiguously considered Actiocyon a separate genus in the subfamily Simocyoninae in the family Ailuridae.

A 2025 review of ailurid taxonomy included both A. leardi and A. parverratis as valid species, with the genus placed in the subfamily Simocyoninae, but noted the inclusion of A. parverratis in Actiocyon was tentative given the overall lack of fossils for both species.

== Description ==
The holotype and only specimen of A. leardi (LACM/CIT 2747) is a fragment of a skull with several attached teeth (upper right canine, second through fourth premolars, first and second molars). Stock noted that when the specimen was collected there were three small, poorly preserved incisors present on the right side of the snout that were apparently lost before the specimen was prepared in the laboratory. No other fossils have been assigned to A. leardi. Stock compared A. leardi in size to Cynodesmus thomsoni (=Desmocyon thomsoni), which is estimated to have weighed approximately 7 kilograms (15 lb).

Jon Baskin, in his 1998 chapter on fossil procyonids (which included ailurids at the time), listed the following characteristics as diagnostic of A. leardi: four premolars, with the fourth only slightly longer than the first molar and possessing a very small parastyle, a narrow internal shelf that extends from the back as a cingulum, and a very small protocone. The first molar is sub-triangular with a low protocone connected to small metaconule, and a prominent rear-internal hypercone. The canine tooth has the same groove down the side present in Simocyon and Alopecocyon.

Three specimens from three different localities are assigned to Actiocyon parverratis. The holotype (UCMP 141928) consists of both halves of a mandible (lower jaw), both with attached complete teeth (second through fourth premolar, first and second molars). Of the other two fossils, one is part of the left maxilla (upper jaw) with the fourth premolar attached, while the second is partial right mandible with the third and fourth premolars and the first molar attached.

Smith and colleagues noted that A. parverratis differed from Simocyon in its much smaller size, the presence of non-reduced second and third premolars, the lack of a protocone and possibly a small parastyle on the fourth premolar, the second molar having joined trigonid crests that form a small, sub-circular structure, and in the trigonid on the second molar being narrower than the talonid. They noted that A. parverratis differed from Alopecocyon in the trigonid crest structure of the second molar; that tooth also has a larger protoconid than metaconid, the talonid is longer and wider than the trigonid, and prominent cusps form a median talonid ridge. Finally, Smith and colleagues distinguished A. parverratis from A. leardi by its smaller overall size, the maxilla having a relatively larger and lower-set infraorbital foramen, and by the fourth premolar having a less-developed and undivided hypocone on the internal cingulum.

== Paleoecology ==
Actiocyon leardi is part of the Cuyama fauna, a late Barstovian or early Clarendonian (18–8.4 mya) assemblage of vertebrates that also includes the ground squirrel Citellus quatalensis, the pocket mouse Perognathus furlongi, the rabbit Hypolagus apachensis, the equids Merychippus, Protohippus, and Hipparion, the pronghorn Merycodus, a mastodont, a camelid, and various avians and testudines. The Caliente Formation in the Cuyama Basin is a series of fluvial and lacustrine sediments representing a very wet coastal environment.

Actiocyon parverratis is part of the Barstovian-aged (14.7–9.8 mya) Eastgate Local Fauna, a highly diverse assemblage including fish, reptiles, amphibians, birds, and at least sixty species of mammals from seven different orders. Paleobotanical studies of the fossils sites indicate that the area was a mixed conifer-hardwood forest in north-facing canyons; known flora species include the fir Abies concoloroides, larches Larix cassiana and Larix nevadensis, serviceberry Amelanchier grayi, and buckeye Aesculus preglabra. The canyons are thought to have been a mesic habitat with a mean annual temperature of 10.2 °C (50.4 °F), at an altitude of 2,700–2,800 metres (8,900–9,200 ft).
