= Barstovian =

North American faunal stage

The Barstovian North American Stage is a faunal stage of the North American Land Mammal Ages (NALMA) system, set from around 16.3 to 12.5 million years ago, though the age of its base is still under debate. It is usually considered to overlap the Langhian and Serravallian stages of the Middle Miocene. The Barstovian is preceded by the Hemingfordian and followed by the Clarendonian NALMA stages. It is named after the Barstow Formation of California.

== Age and definition ==
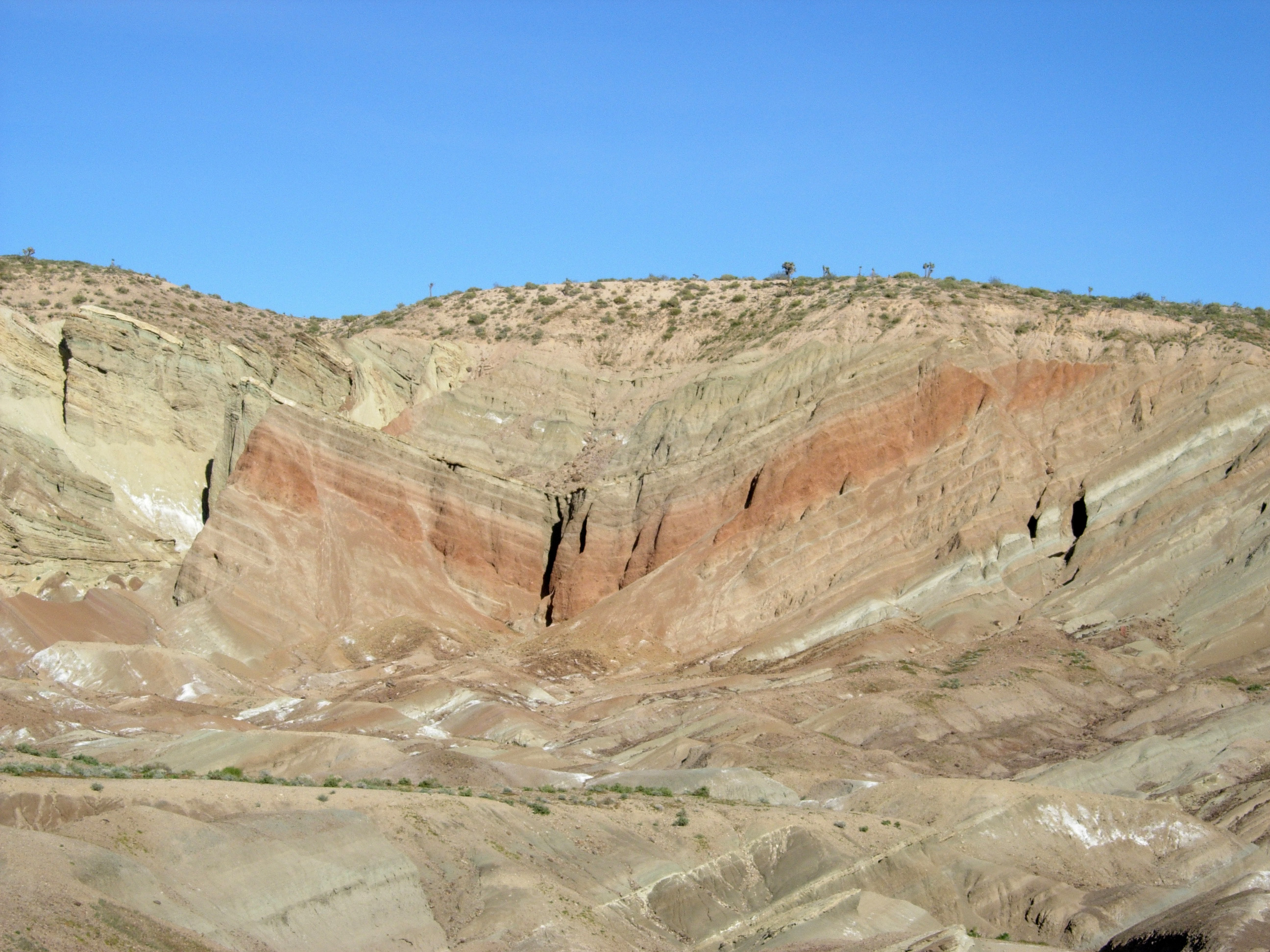
Syncline in the Barstow Formation (Barstovian) in Rainbow Basin near Barstow, California.

The Barstovian has been difficult to define based on mammalian index fossils, since by this time North American faunas have split into several biogeographic provinces. Another complication is that mammals found in the Barstow Formation (the Barstovian type locality) may appear later or earlier in other parts of the continent.

The Barstovian is further divided into two substages:

- Early Barstovian (Ba1)
- Late Barstovian (Ba2)

=== Early Barstovian ===
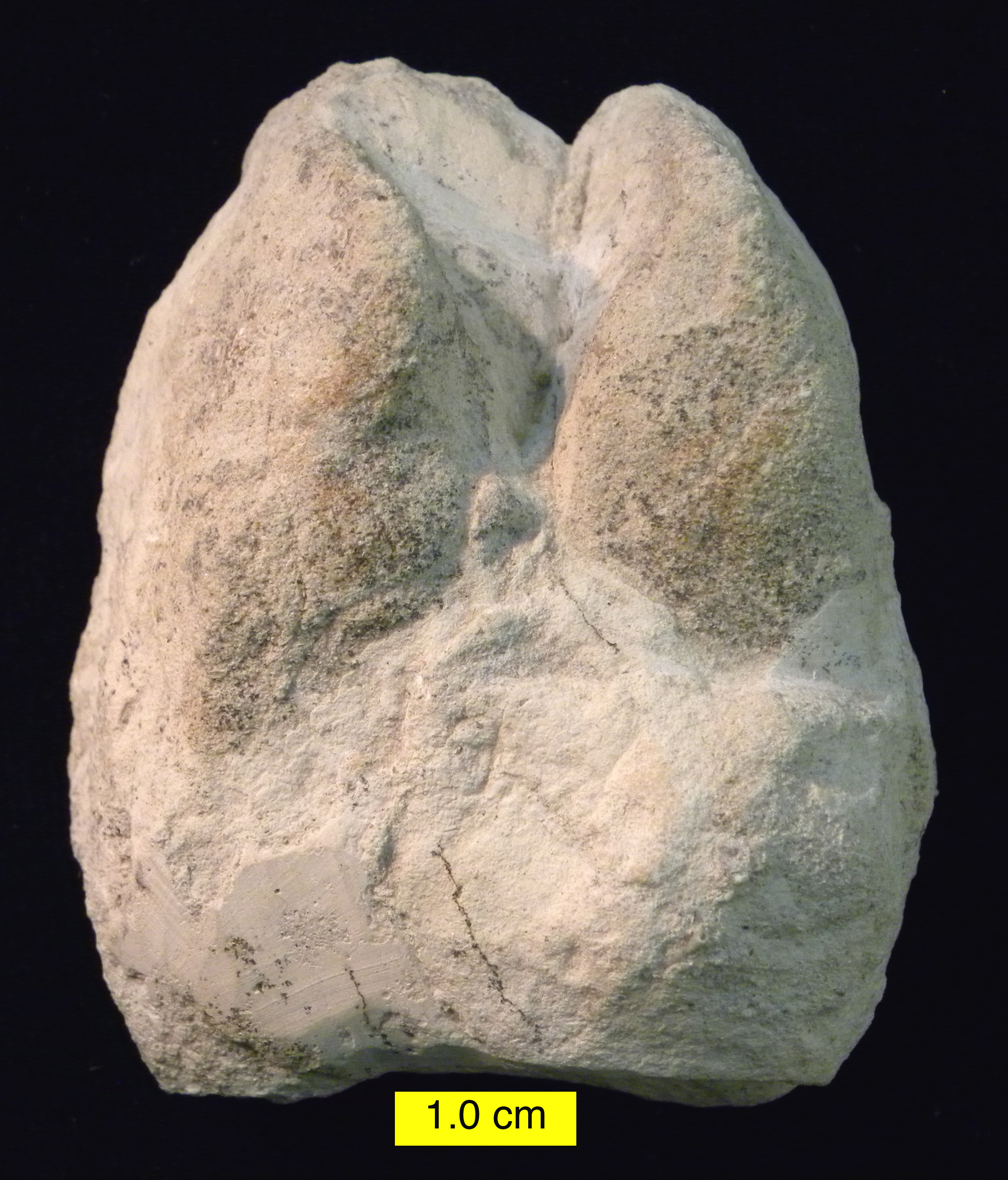
Camelid footprint (Lamaichnum alfi Sarjeant and Reynolds, 1999; convex hyporelief) from the Barstow Formation (Barstovian) of Rainbow Basin, California.

One traditional marker of the Barstovian is a "Proboscidean Datum": the arrival of the first proboscideans (elephant relatives) in North America. Zygolophodon (an early mammutid, related to mastodons) and Gomphotherium (an early gomphothere) are two examples of common Barstovian proboscideans. The earliest North American Zygolophodon fossils are from the Massacre Lake fauna in Nevada, about 16.3-16.5 Ma. In California, Zygolophodon is only found in layers younger than 15.7 Ma. On the Great Plains, proboscideans do not occur until 14.3 Ma. This asynchronous spread of proboscideans has led some studies to reject their use as Barstovian index taxa. Massacre Lake and faunas of a similar age may be regarded as either latest Hemingfordian or earliest Barstovian, depending on where one defines the boundary.

More widespread and synchronous mammal first appearances are necessary to define the Barstovian on a continent-wide scale. One mammal which could define the base is Plithocyon, a hemicyonine bear. In California, Plithocyon first appears at 15.88 ± 0.06 Ma. Aelurodon, a widespread borophagine dog useful for cross-region correlation, first appears at 15.2 Ma. Copemys, a widespread rodent which was historically used as a Barstovian index taxon, first appears at 16.2 Ma. Those who prefer an older (~16.3 Ma) base for the Barstovian tie it to a medium-to-large subspecies of Brachycrus laticeps (a tapir-like oreodont).

=== Late Barstovian ===
The late Barstovian (Ba2) is sometimes tied to Gomphotherium, which appears in the Barstow Formation around 14.8 Ma. Although Gomphotherium only becomes widespread past 14.3 Ma, it may have been present in Texas and Mexico as early as 16 Ma, complicating its use as an index taxon. An alternative proposal is tied to the early antilocaprid (pronghorn relative) Ramoceros, around 15 Ma. The end of the Barstovian (and therefore the base of the Clarendonian) is tied to the gelocid Pseudoceras, which first appears around 12.4-12.5 Ma.

== Mammal fauna ==
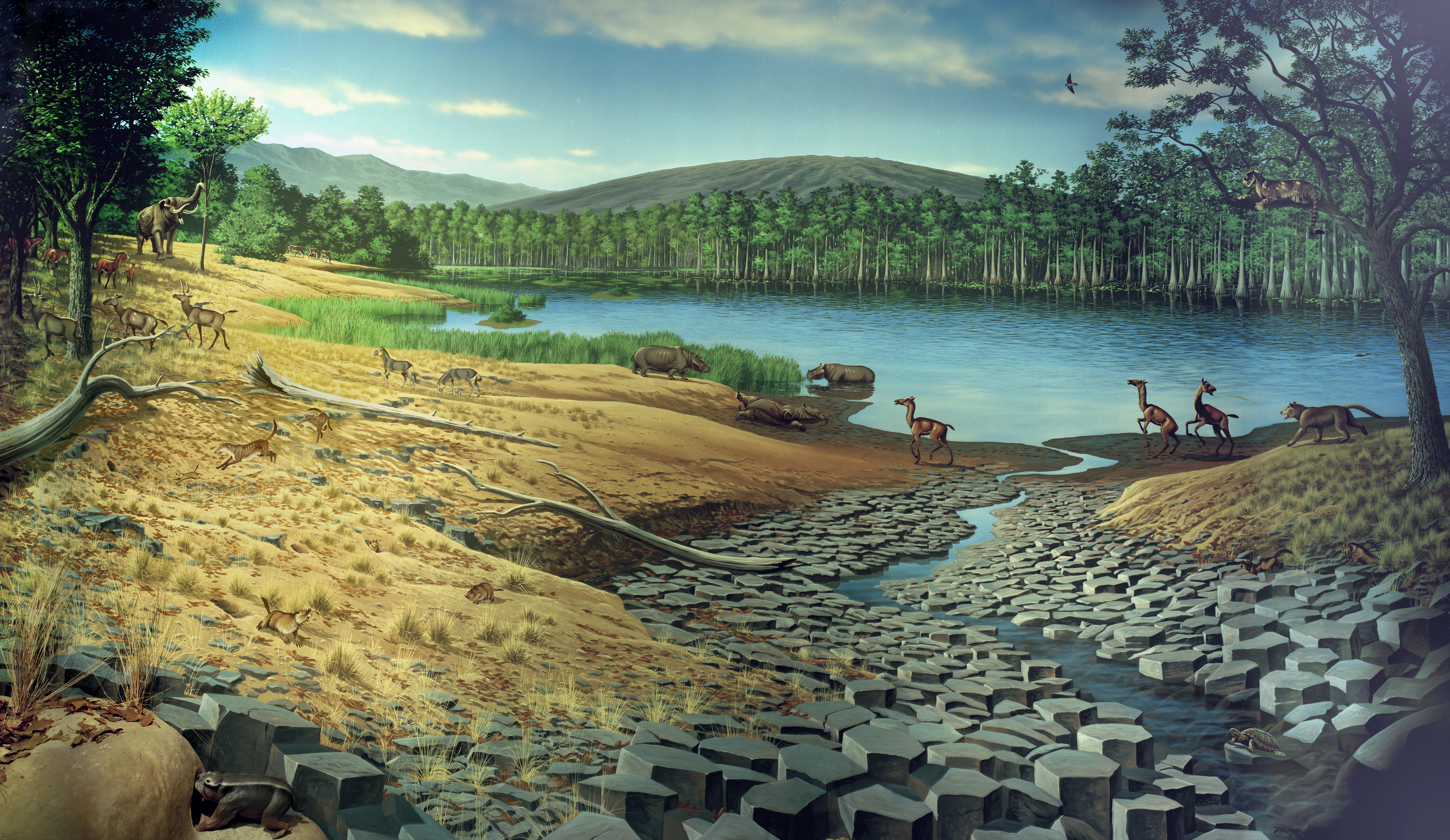
A paleoart mural depicting the ecosystem of the Mascall Formation, Barstovian Oregon

Many mammal groups have a diversity peak in the late Hemingfordian to early Barstovian, only to decline sharply in the late Barstovian. This dynamic may relate to the Middle Miocene Climatic Optimum (MMCO), a very warm interval of the Miocene from around 17-14 Ma (i.e. late Hemingfordian to early Barstovian). Dense subtropical forests returned to some areas where they had been absent since the Oligocene. After the MMCO, the climate cooled rapidly during the Middle Miocene Climatic Transition (MMCT), which forced many North American ecosystems into conditions which were even cooler and drier than before the MMCO. A major consequence of the climate transition is that faunas of the early Barstovian are very similar to the late Hemingfordian (together forming the "Sheep Creek Chronofauna"), while the late Barstovian is far closer to Late Miocene (Clarendonian and Hemphillian) faunas.

=== Ungulates ===
As the largest herbivores on land, proboscideans (elephant relatives) were major ecosystem engineers. After immigrating into North America in the late Hemingfordian, they spread across the entire continent during the Barstovian. Among them were gomphotheres like Gomphotherium and early mammutids like Zygolophodon, a possible ancestor to mastodons.

The Barstovian is a high point of equid (horse) diversity, with many species of the older Anchitheriinae and the recently evolved Equinae (Equini and Hipparionini). Anchitheriines peaked around 15.5 Ma, declining sharply afterwards. By the end of the Barstovian, hypsodont (high-crowned) horse species outnumbered brachydont (low-crowned) or mesodont (intermediate) species for the first time, signalling a greater reliance on grass in their diet.

The last North American chalicotheres (large perissodactyls with long legs and clawed feet) lived during the Barstovian, probably succumbing to the increasingly dry conditions of the MMCT. Tapirs were very rare in the early Barstovian, but the earliest species of Tapirus (modern tapirs) originated around 16-14 Ma. The only rhinos in Barstovian North America were the aceratheriines: hornless, short-legged beasts like Teleoceras, Peraceras, and Aphelops.

Oreodonts were on the decline: Merychyus and Ticholeptus died out in the early Barstovian as the last of their respective subfamilies. The tapir-like Brachycrus lasted a little longer, but only the ustatochoerine oreodonts survived beyond the Barstovian. Stenomylines ("gazelle-like camels") went extinct around the end of the Barstovian, but other camelid subfamilies such as miolabines and protolabines persisted further. Among new Barstovian camelids, Aepycamelus and Procamelus are the earliest members of the tribes Lamini and Camelini (which lead to modern llamas and camels, respectively).

Pseudoparablastomeryx, the last leptomerycid (small hornless ruminants), survived to the early Barstovian. The last and largest hesperhyine peccary was Hesperhys, which also lasted into the early Barstovian. Other Barstovian artiodactyls include early moschids (musk deer relatives), antilocaprids (pronghorn relatives), and horned deer-like mammals which are fully extinct today: synthetoceratines and dromomerycids.

Barstovian ungulates (Proboscidea, Perissodactyla, Artiodactyla)

Gomphotherium, a gomphothere

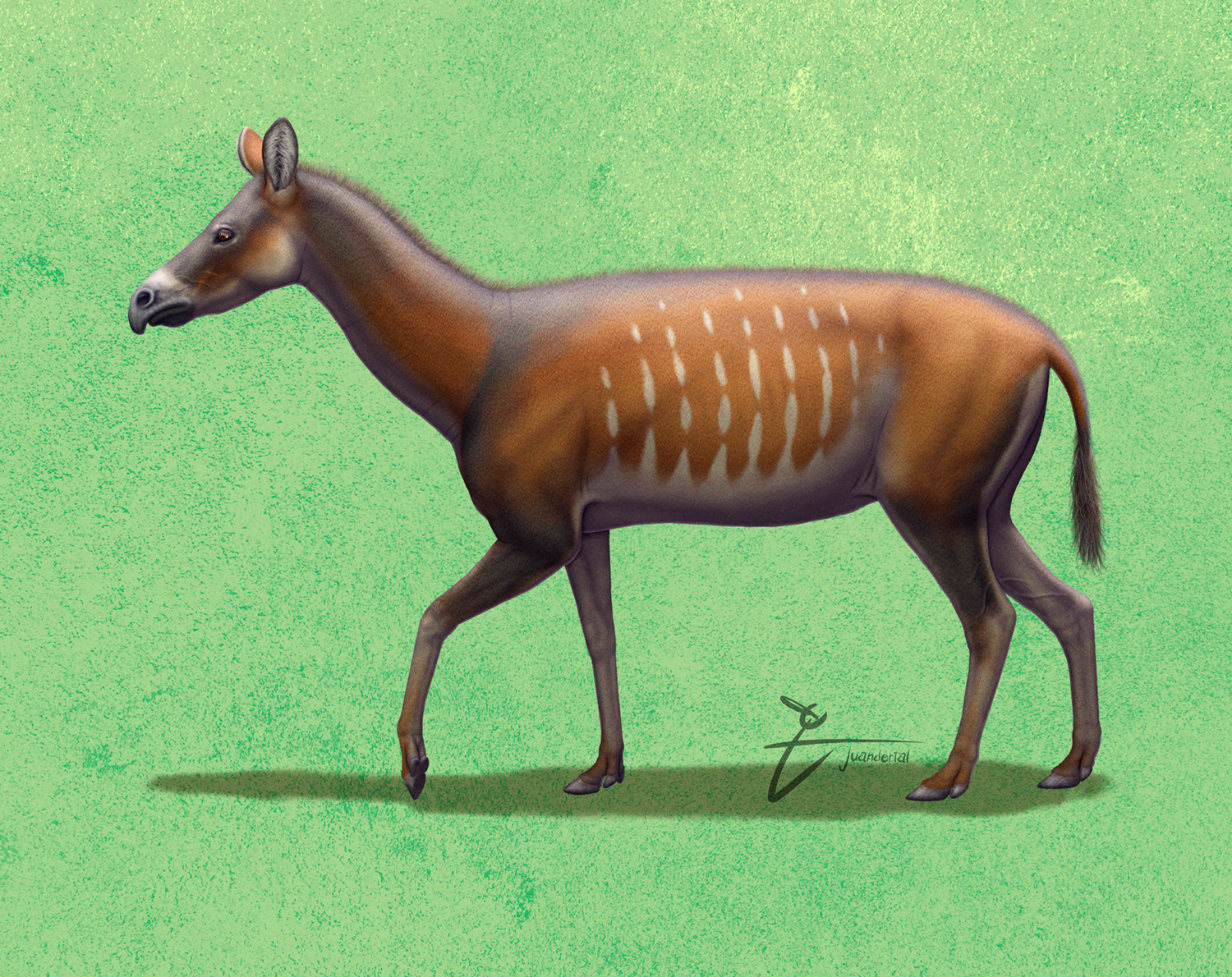
Hypohippus, an anchitheriine horse

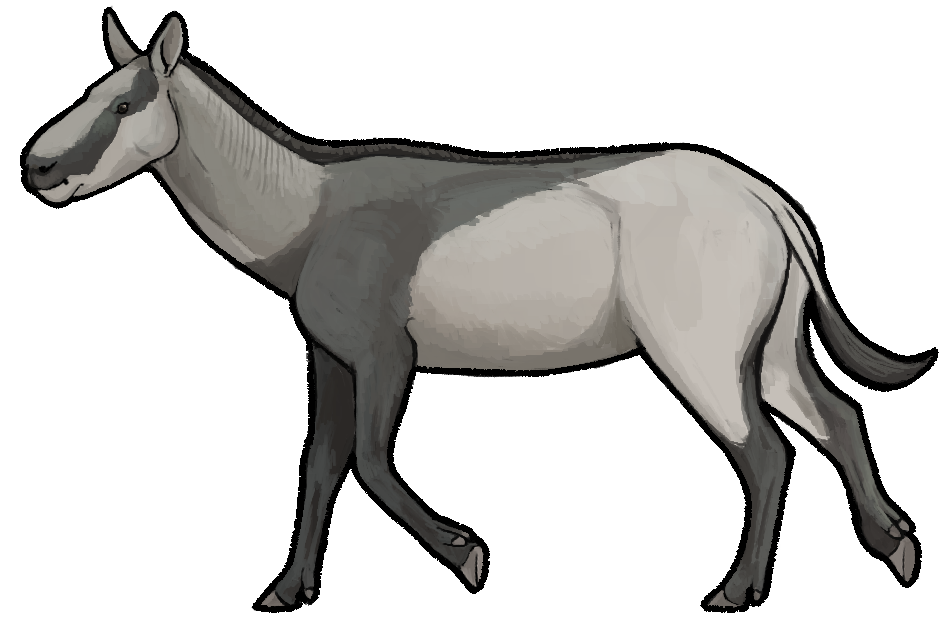
Merychippus insignis, an early equine horse

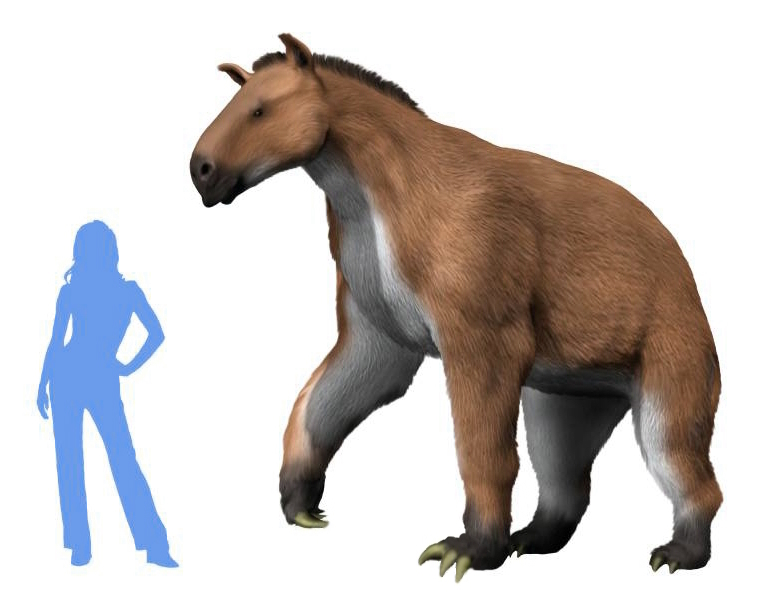
Moropus, a chalicothere

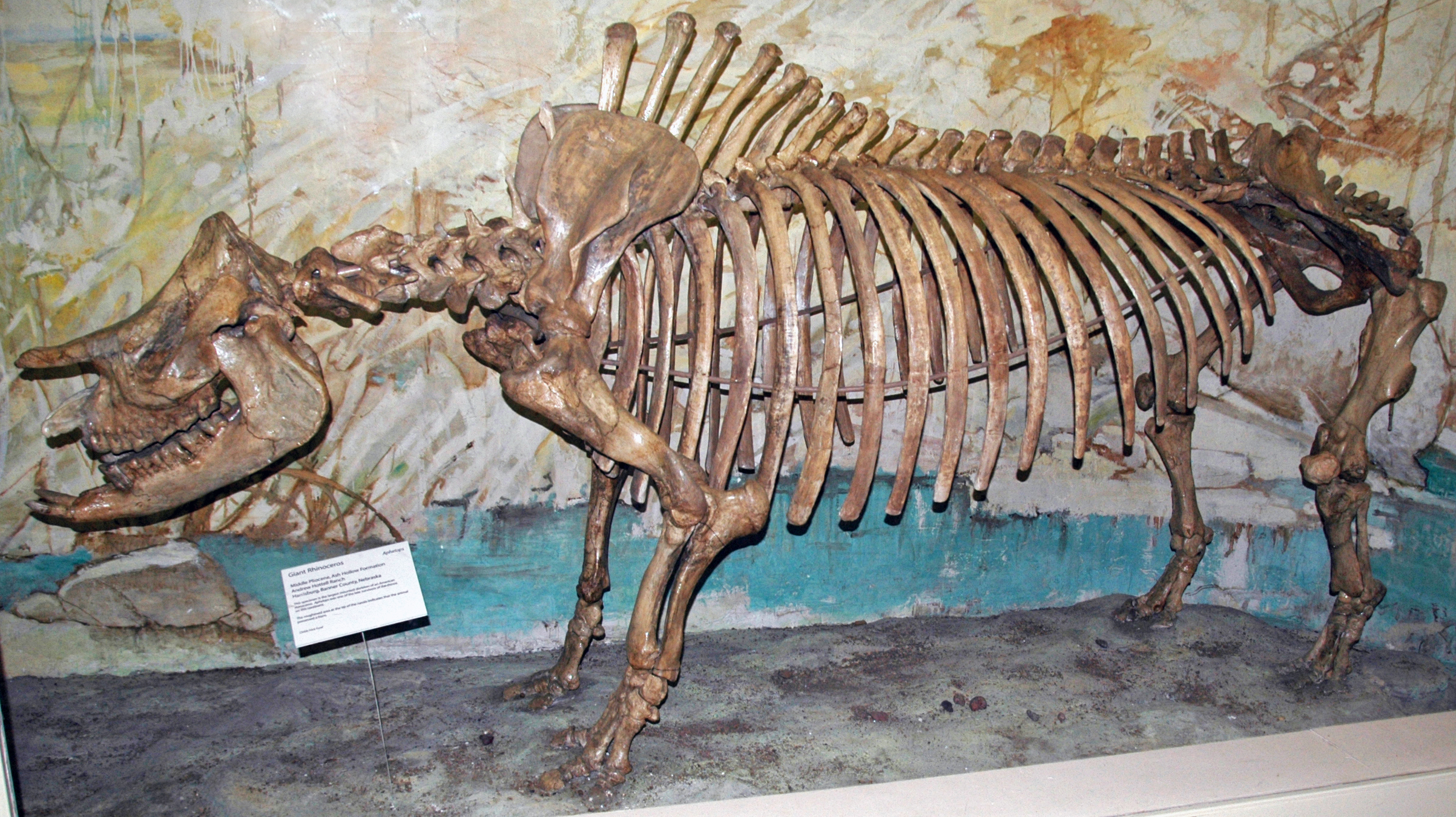
Aphelops, an aceratheriine rhino

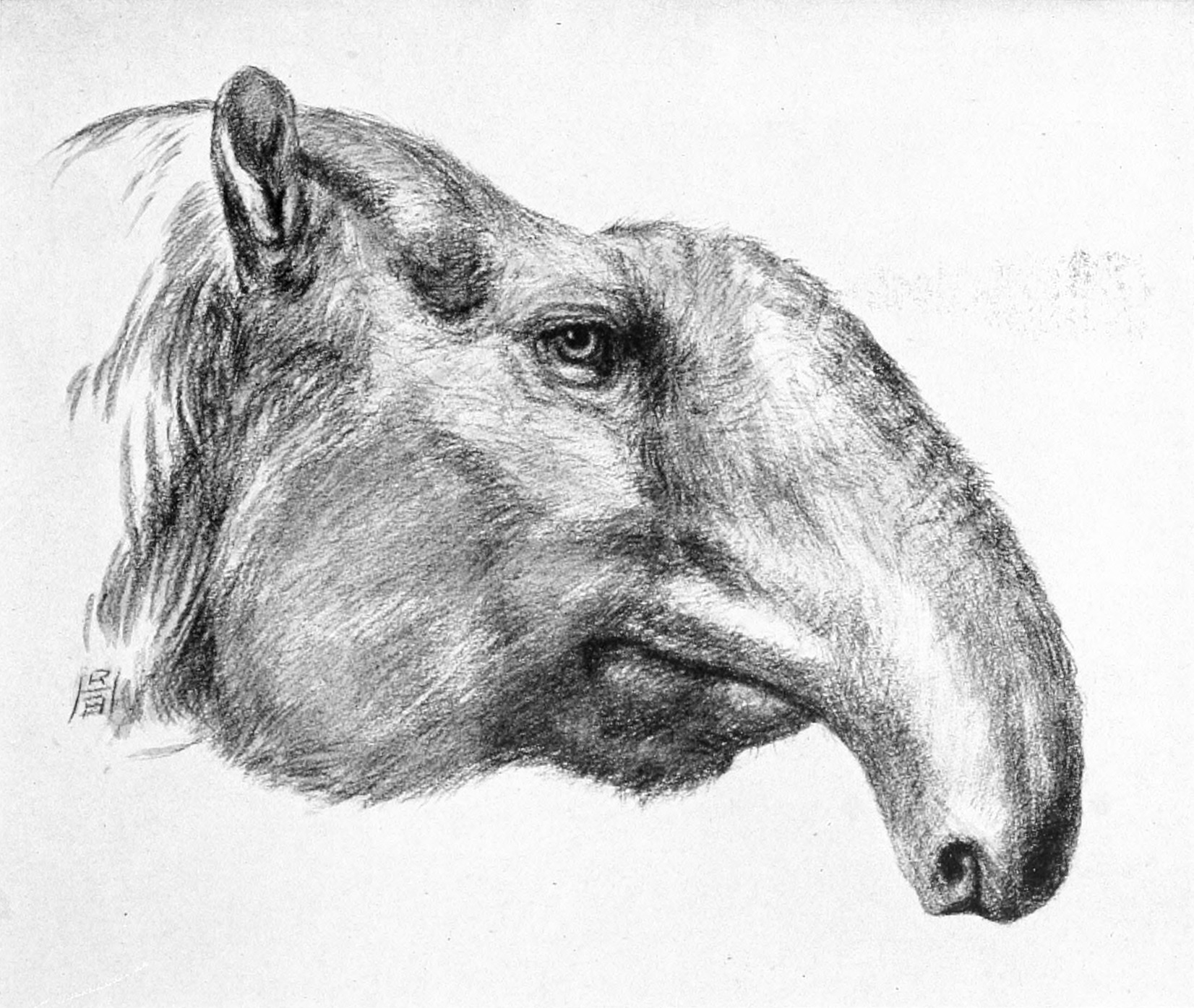
Brachycrus, a tapir-like oreodont

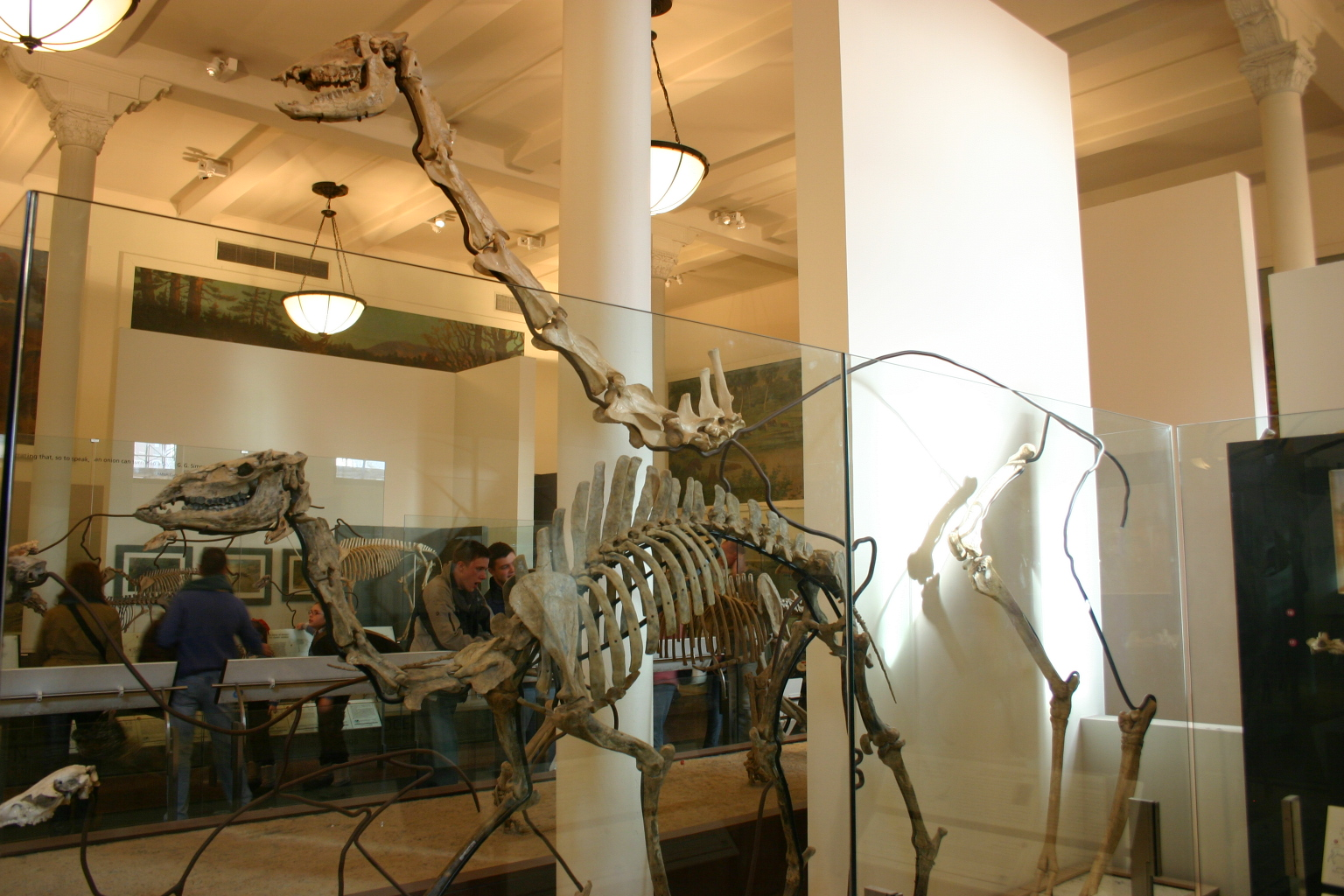
Procamelus (left) and Aepycamelus (right), two early camelines

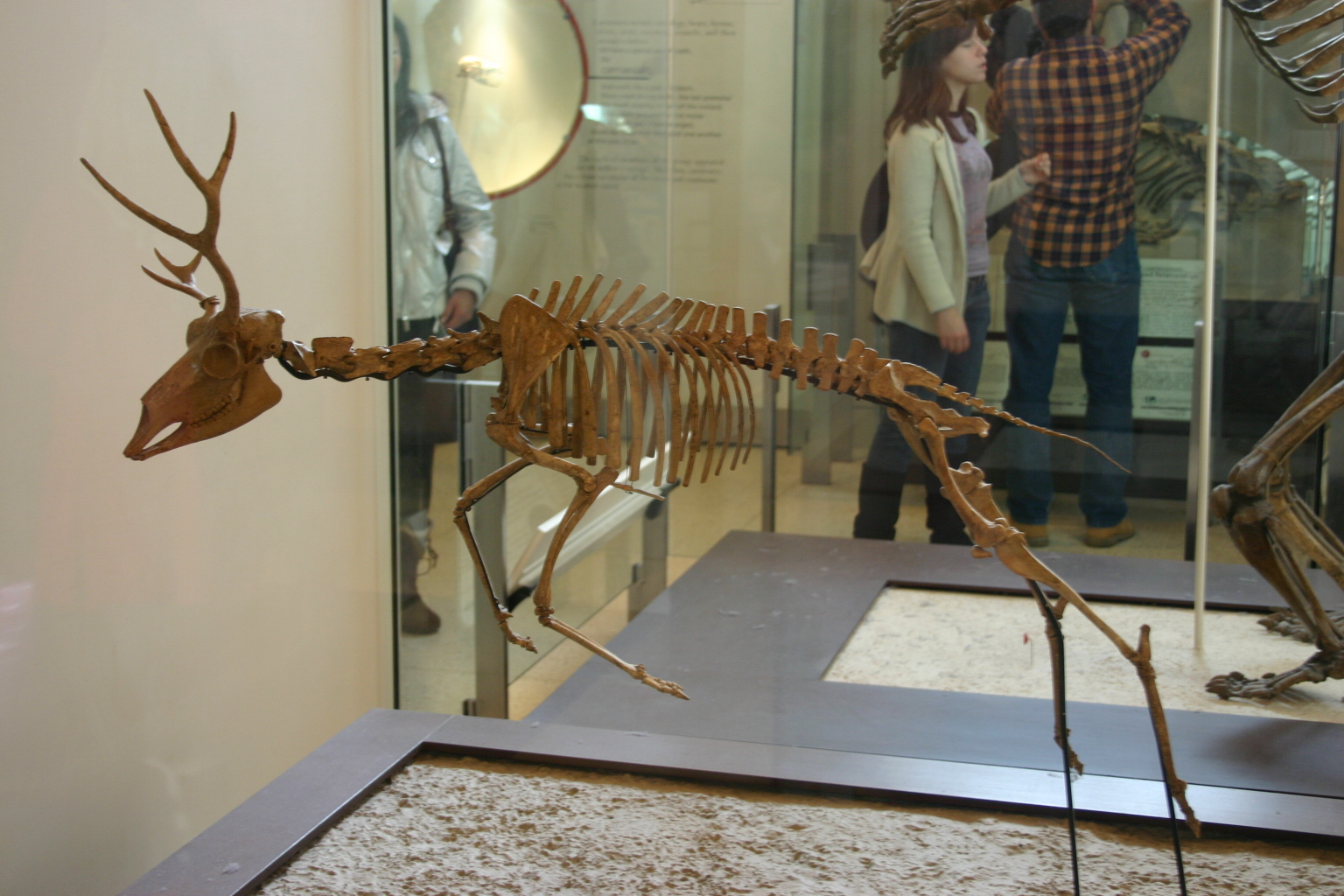
Ramoceros, an early antilocaprid (pronghorn)

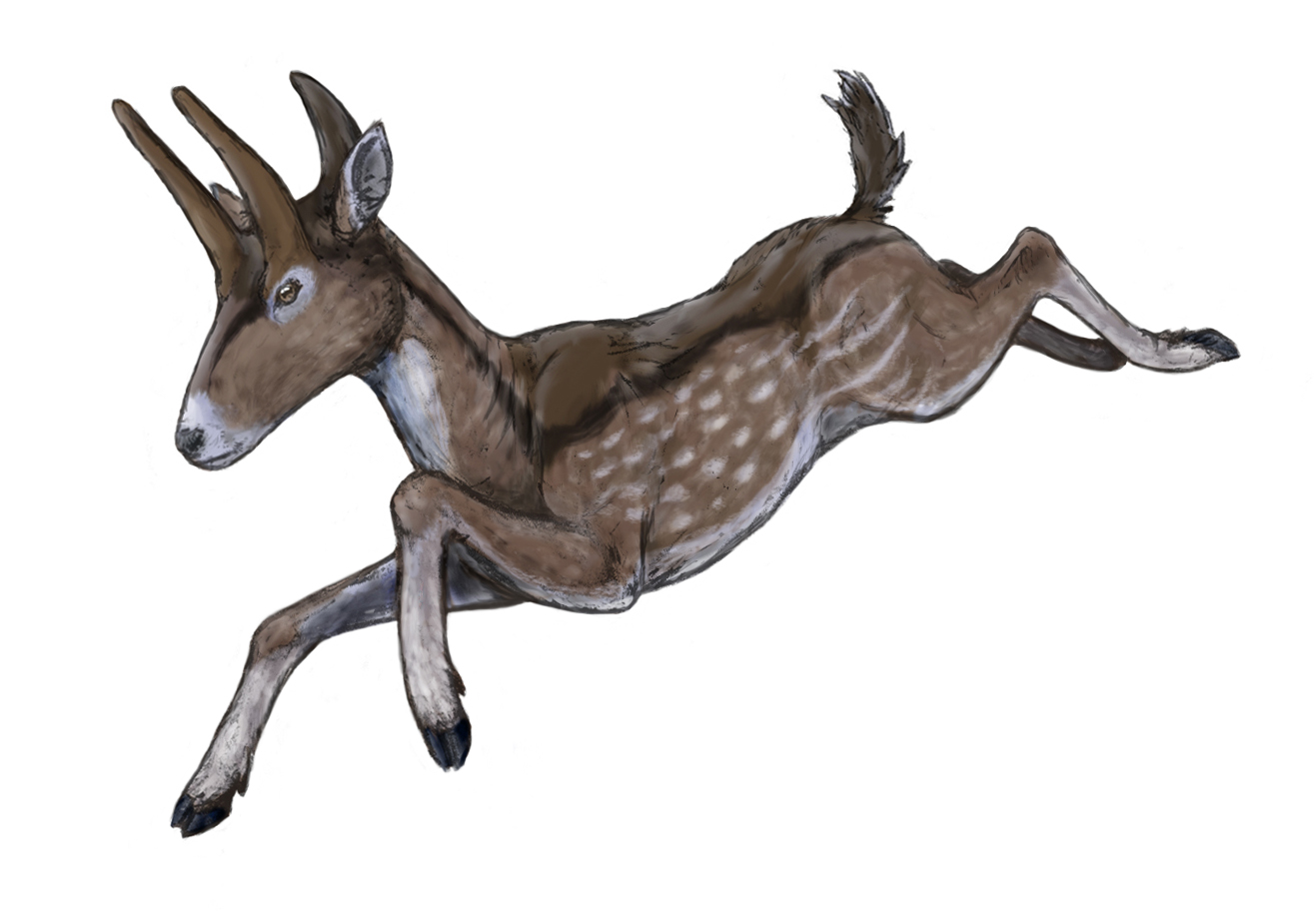
Procranioceras, a dromomerycid

=== Carnivorans ===
Borophagines were the most common members of the dog family at this time. During the Barstovian, hypercarnivorous borophagines (such as Tomarctus and Aelurodon) overtake omnivorous borophagines (such as Cynarctoides and Cynarctus) in overall diversity. Osbornodon fricki, the last species of hesperocyonine dog, went extinct in the early Barstovian. Canines (the subfamily of living dogs and kin) were still rare and represented by the sole genus Leptocyon.

The wolf-like hemicyonine ("dog-bear") Plithocyon was a common large carnivore. Other bears were more omnivorous, like Ursavus. Both hemicyonines and ursavines had lived on the continent for quite a while by the Barstovian. The oldest known member of Ursinae (the subfamily containing most modern bears) is Aurorarctos, an omnivore which lived in late Barstovian Nebraska.

A related group, the now-extinct amphicyonids ("bear dogs") were low in diversity but still a major group of large carnivores, represented by the panther-shaped amphicyonines. Some of these bear-dogs were enormous, such as Amphicyon ingens, an early Barstovian species which was the largest terrestrial carnivore of its time.

Felids (cats), such as Pseudaelurus and Hyperailurictis, had recently arrived from Eurasia during the Hemingfordian, and most were still uncommon in the Barstovian. More omnivorous carnivorans like early ailurids (red panda relatives) and procyonids (raccoon relatives) were also recent arrivals. Teeth similar to living procyonids in the genus Bassariscus (ringtails and cacomistles) are known from the Barstovian, though the modern genus may be much more recent.

Genetic markers suggest that crown-group mustelids originated in the early Barstovian, and during the MMCT they evolved distinctive features such as a long body, small size, and robust skull. Some Hemingfordian-Barstovian mustelids (in the broad sense) are clearly part of the stem-group, such as the extinct oligobunines. Others are more ambiguous. For example, Leptarctus, Mionictis, Plionictis were similar to badgers, otters, and martens, respectively. However, they all appear in the fossil record prior to the estimated common ancestor of modern mustelids, so they may be part of the stem-group as well.

Barstovian carnivorans

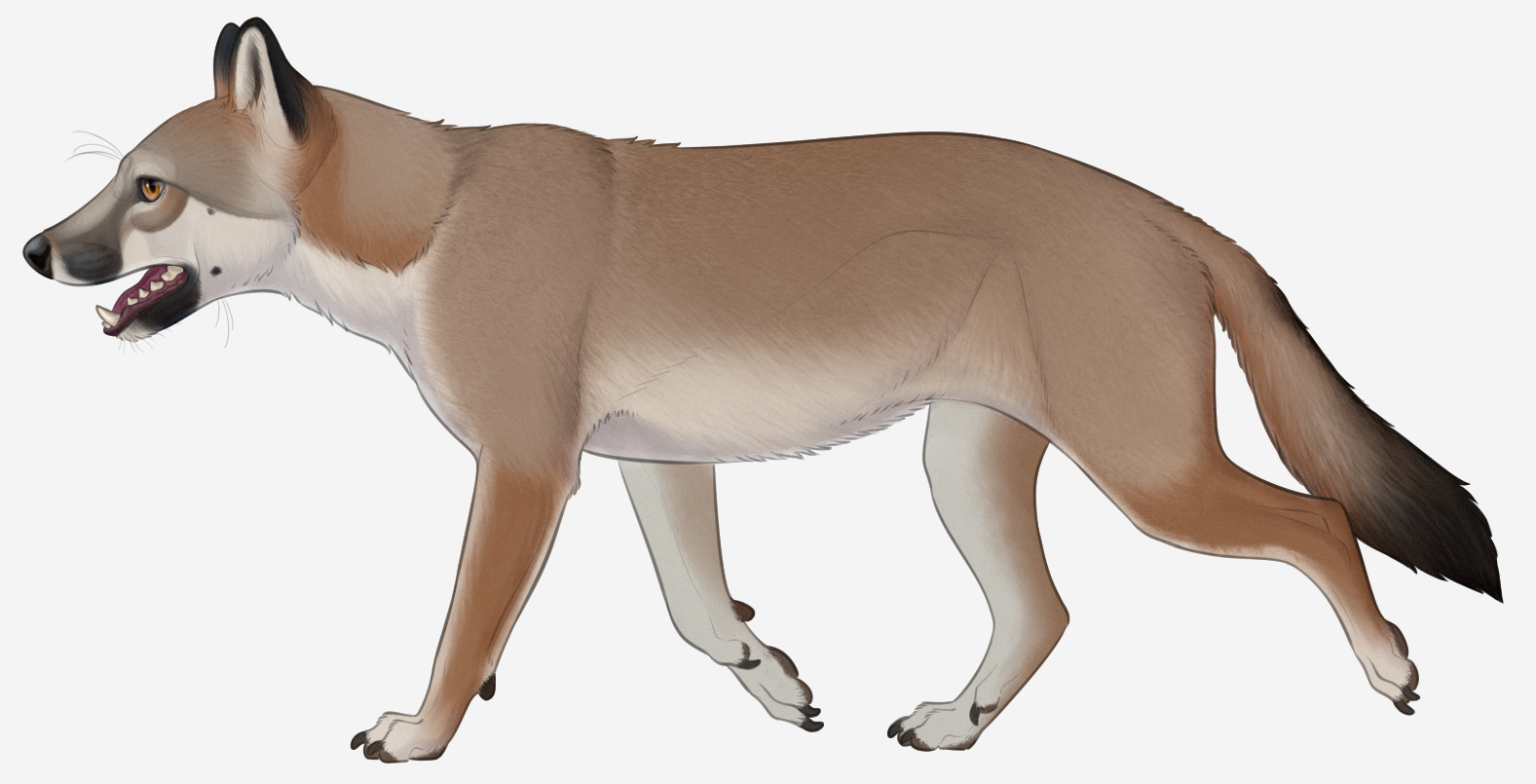
Tomarctus, a borophagine dog

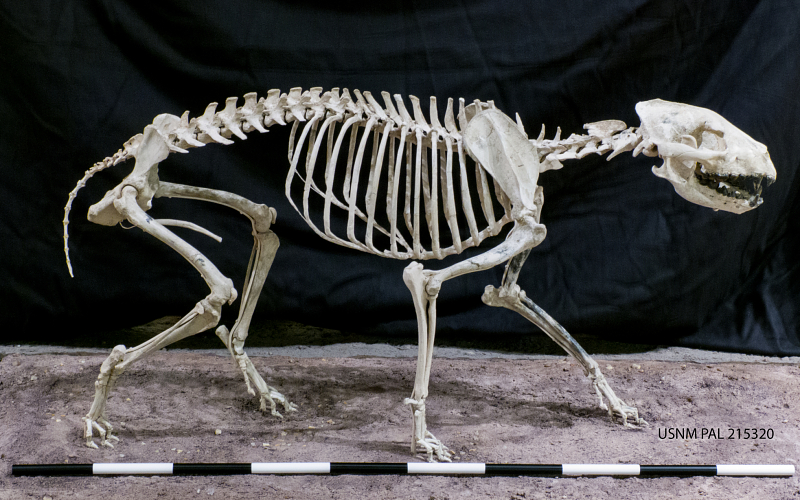
Aelurodon, a borophagine dog

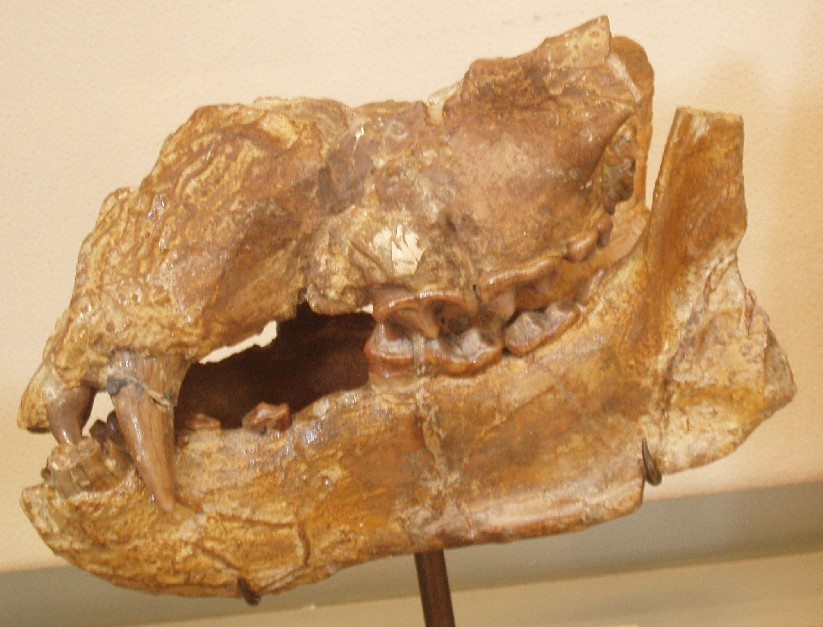
Plithocyon, a hemicyonine ("dog-bear")

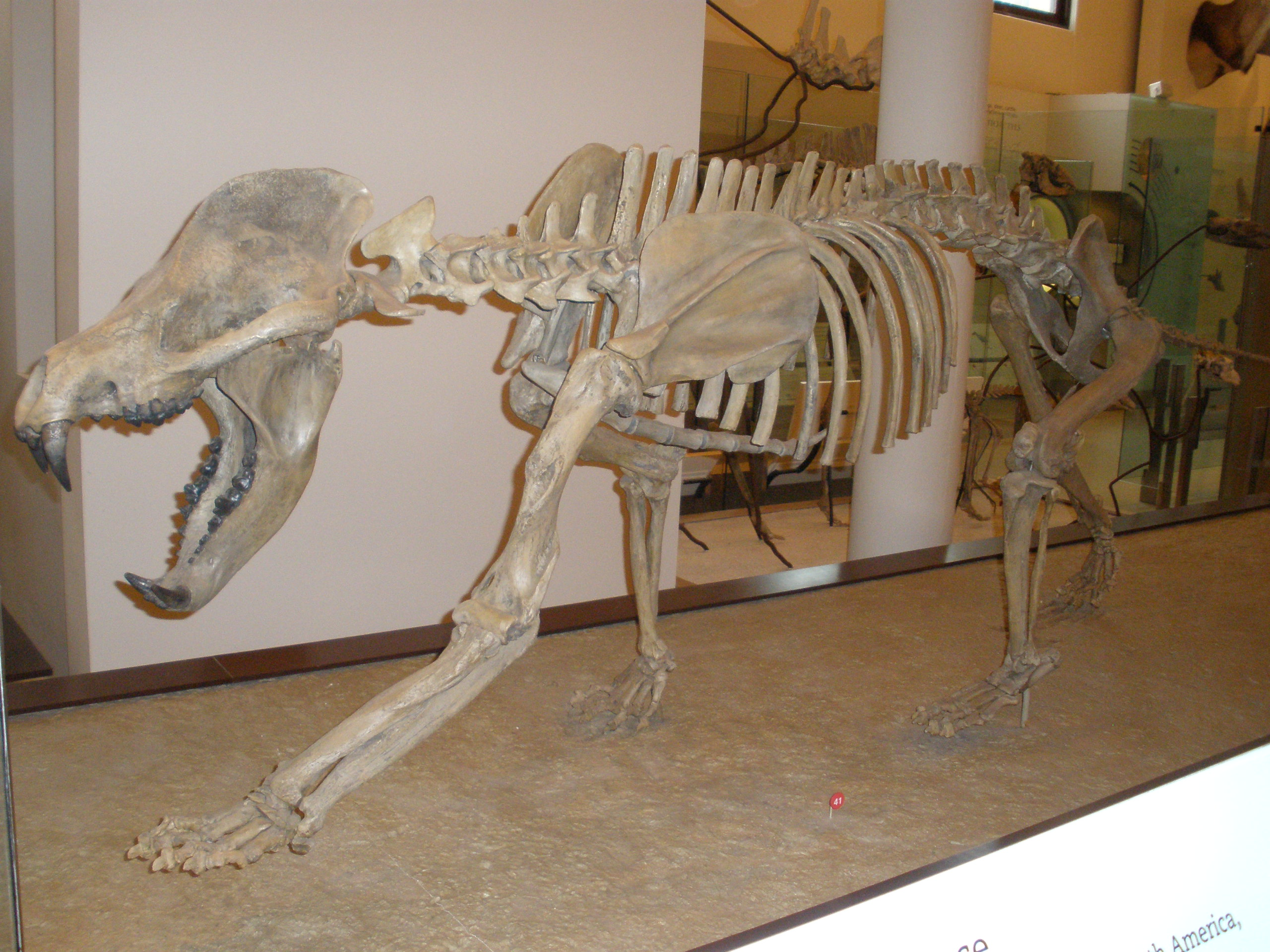
Amphicyon ingens, a giant amphicyonid ("bear-dog")

Pseudaelurus, a true cat

Plionictis, a mustelid (sensu lato)

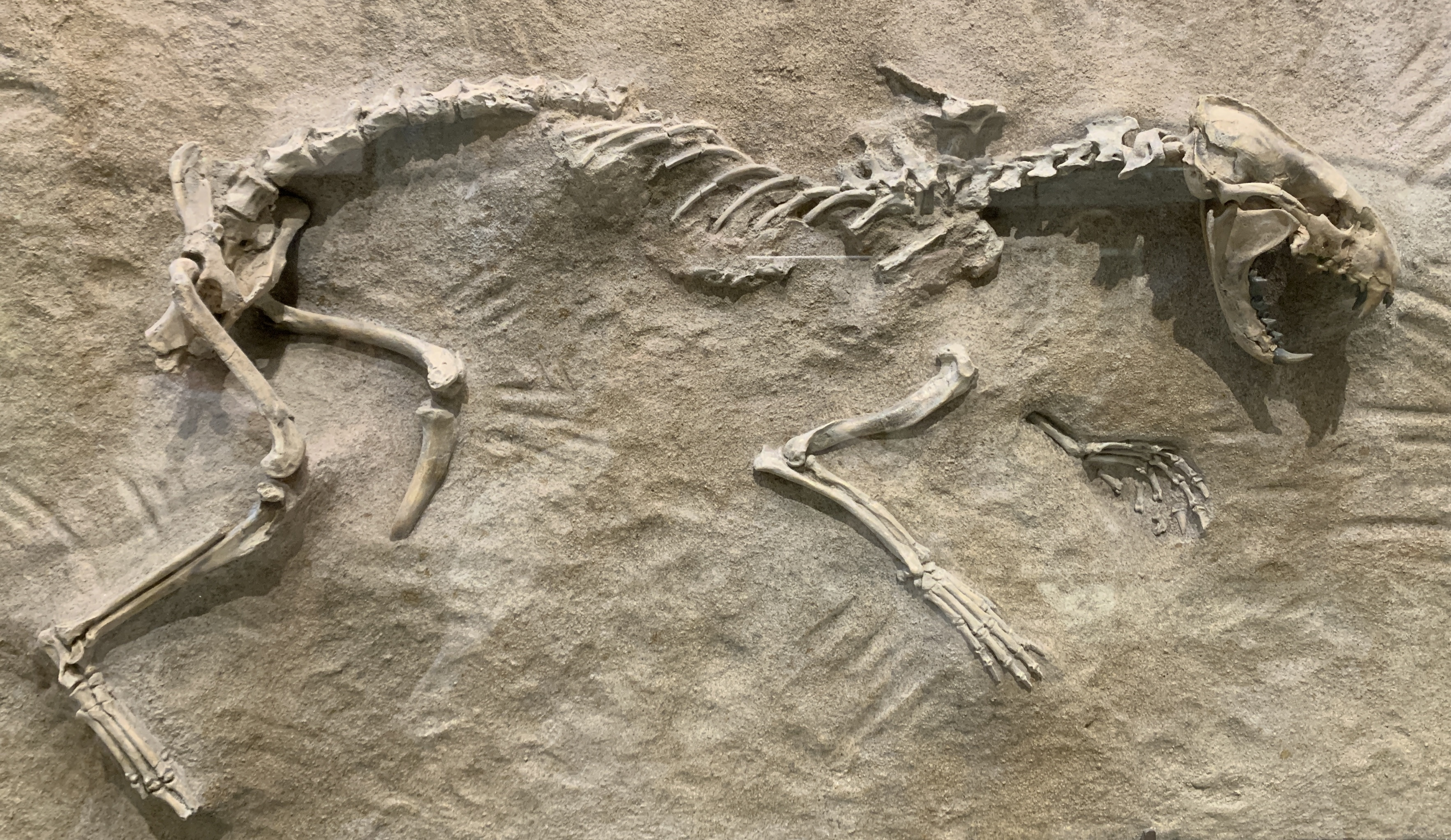
Sthenictis, a mustelid (sensu lato)

=== Small mammals ===
North American metatherians (marsupial relatives) such as Herpetotherium were very rare in the Miocene and likely went extinct during the Barstovian, if not earlier. Mesoscalops, the last proscalopid (early mole-like mammals), also died out in the Barstovian. Other eulipotyphlans fared better, with erinaceids (hedgehogs and kin) and shrews maintaining respectable diversity. Talpidae (true moles and kin) increased in diversity in the late Barstovian, with the desman-like Gaillardia as a notable new taxon. Vesper bats were present but rarely fossilized.

Among lagomorphs, ochotonids (pikas and kin) were more diverse than leporids (rabbits and hares). Archaeolagines (early rabbits) like Hypolagus were very common, and during the Barstovian they were joined by more modern leporine rabbits like Pronotolagus and Alilepus.

Squirrels and castorids (beaver relatives) were diverse and abundant. Aplodontiids (mountain beaver relatives) and eomyids (extinct squirrel-like rodents) were still present, but their diversity was low and falling. The gopher-like mylagaulids saw a diversity turnover, with the last of the older promylagaulines giving way to the increasingly common mylagaulines. The large horn-bearing mylagaulid Ceratogaulus became particularly widespread in the Barstovian. Barstovian dipodoids (jerboa-like rodents) include probable sminthids (birch mice), such as the long-lasting Plesiosminthus and the newcomer Megasminthus. The later may be the earliest zapodid (jumping mice), or transitional between sminthids and zapodids.

Among geomyoid rodents, early heteromyids (kangaroo rats, pocket mice, and kin) peak in diversity during the Barstovian, though most Middle Miocene forms were unrelated to modern species. Geomyines (pocket gophers) reappear in the fossil record after a long gap since the Eocene. Their less specialized relatives, the entoptychines, die out in the Barstovian. North American cricetids (New World mice and rats) were low in diversity compared to their modern prominence on the continent. Copemys was one of the few common cricetids during the Barstovian, and may be ancestral to later lineages.

== Correlations ==
The Barstovian correlates with:

- South American Land Mammal Ages (SALMA):
  - Colloncuran (15.5-13.8 Ma)
  - earliest Laventan (13.8-11.8 Ma)
- European Land Mammal Ages (ELMA) / Mammal Neogene Zones (MN):
  - Astaracian (15.97-11.608 Ma) / MN 5 zone (15.97-13.65 Ma)
- Central Paratethys Stage (CPS):
  - earliest Badenian (13.65-12.7 Ma)
- New Zealand stratigraphy - Southland epoch (15.9-10.92 Ma)
  - Clifdenian (15.9-13.65 Ma)
  - earliest Lillburnian (13.65-12.7 Ma)
- Asian Land Mammal Ages (ALMA):
  - Shanwangian (16.9-13.65 Ma)
  - earliest Tunggurian (13.65-11.1 Ma)

== Formations ==
Geological formations preserving Barstovian fossils include:

- California:
  - Barstow Formation (Rak Division?, Alvord Mountain?, Green Hills, Second Division, First Division, and Cronese local faunas)
  - Cajon Valley Formation (unit 5)
  - Caliente Formation (West Dry Canyon, Lower Dome Spring, Upper Dome Spring, and Doe Spring Canyon local faunas)
  - Crowder Formation
  - Temblor Formation (North Coalinga and Sharktooth Hill local faunas)
- Chiapas:
  - Ixtapa Formation
- Colorado:
  - Ogallala Formation
  - Pawnee Creek Formation
- Florida:
  - uppermost Arcadia Formation (Bird Branch and Sweetwater Branch local faunas)
  - Peace River Formation (Bradley fauna)
  - Torreya Formation (Willacoochee Creek fauna)
- Idaho:
  - Railroad Canyon beds
- Maryland / Virginia:
  - Calvert Formation
- Montana / Wyoming:
  - Colter Formation (Pilgrim Creek Member)
  - Deep River Formation
  - Flint Creek beds
  - Hepburn's Mesa Formation
  - Moonstone Formation?
  - Sixmile Creek Formation
- Nebraska:
  - Olcott Formation
  - Sand Canyon beds
  - Upper Sheep Creek fauna?
  - Valentine Formation
- Nevada:
  - Esmeralda Formation (Stewart Springs local fauna)
  - Massacre Lake local fauna?
  - Siebert Formation (Tonopah local fauna)
  - Virgin Valley Formation
- New Mexico:
  - Tesuque Formation (Skull Ridge and Pojoaque members)
- Oaxaca:
  - El Camarón Formation (Nejapa fauna)
  - Matatlán Formation
- Oregon:
  - Mascall Formation
  - Sucker Creek Formation
- Panama:
  - Cucaracha Formation
- Saskatchewan:
  - Wood Mountain Formation
- South Dakota:
  - Fort Randall Formation
- Texas:
  - Fleming Formation / Lagarto Formation
