= Protursus =

Protursus Temporal range: Late Miocene

Scientific classification
- Domain: Eukaryota
- Kingdom: Animalia
- Phylum: Chordata
- Class: Mammalia
- Order: Carnivora
- Family: Ailuridae
- Subfamily: †Simocyoninae
- Genus: †Protursus; Crusafont and Kurtén, 1976

Type species
- †Protursus simpsoni Crusafont and Kurtén, 1976

Synonyms
- Simocyon simpsoni

Extinct genus of ailurid

Protursus is a fossil genus of ailurid with a single species Protursus simpsoni, known from a single left m2 tooth.

== Taxonomy & Evolution ==
Protursus simpsoni was believed to be an ursid (bear) closely related to Ursavus by its original describers. In 1977, Thenius lumped the species into the genus Simocyon as Simocyon simpsoni, but this was rejected in 2005, instead being split back into Protursus, though as a member of the subfamily Simocyoninae.

== Description ==
Protursus simpsoni is known from only a single specimen, a left m2 found at the Late Miocene Can Llobateras site in Spain.
