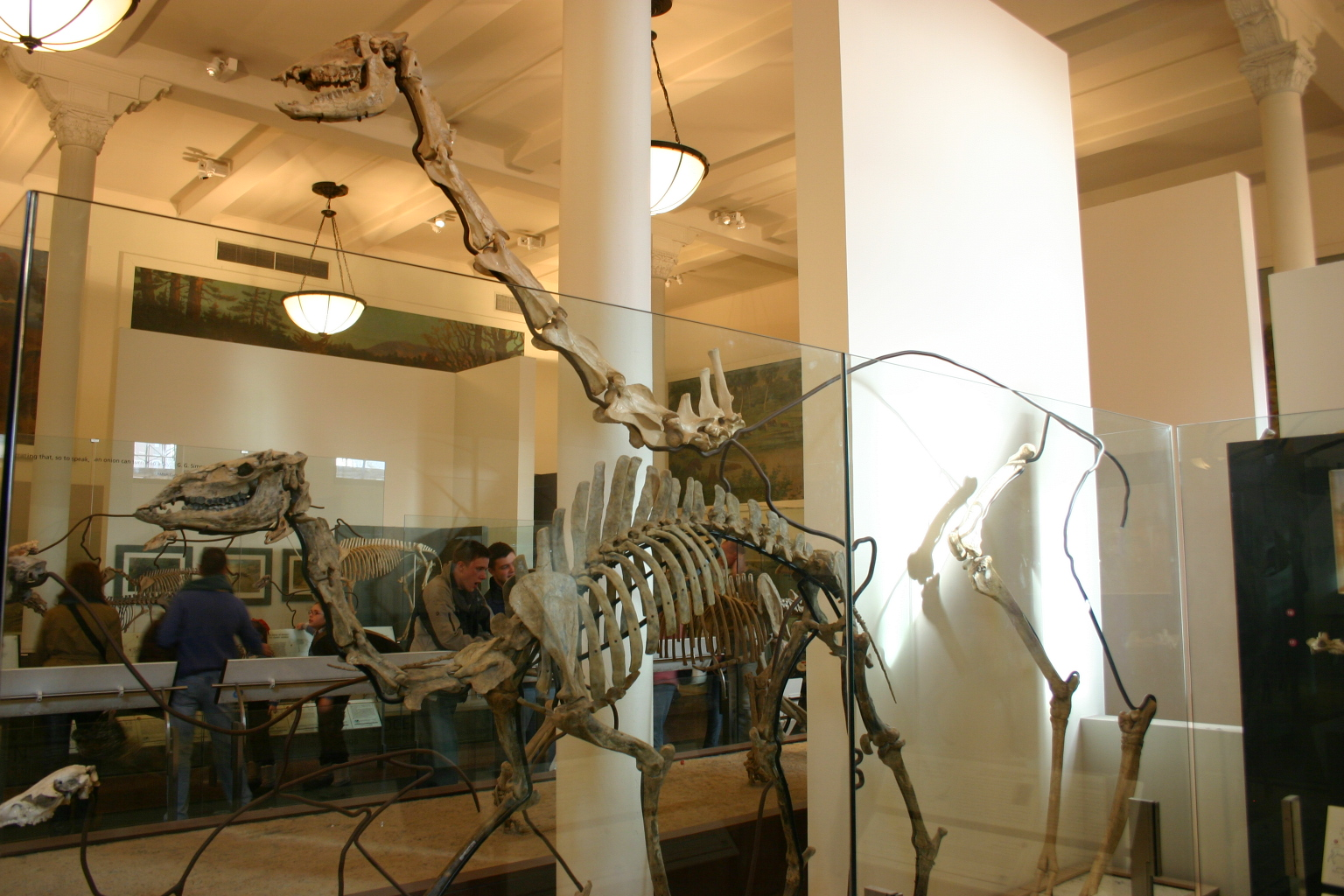
- Holotype partial skeleton of A. giraffinus (top) at the American Museum of Natural History

Scientific classification
- Kingdom: Animalia
- Phylum: Chordata
- Class: Mammalia
- Order: Artiodactyla
- Family: Camelidae
- Subfamily: Camelinae
- Tribe: Lamini
- Genus: †Aepycamelus; MacDonald, 1956

Species
- †Aepycamelus bradyi MacDonald, 1956 †Aepycamelus giraffinus (Matthew and Cook, 1909) (type) †Aepycamelus major (Leidy, 1886)
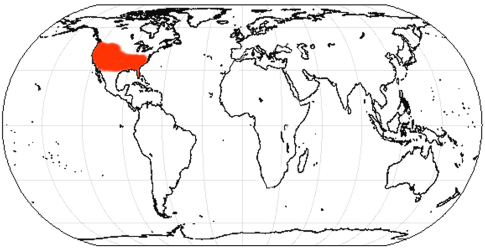
- Geographic range of Aepycamelus

Synonyms
- Blancocamelus Dalquest, 1975

= Aepycamelus =

Aepycamelus Temporal range: Miocene–Pleistocene (Barstovian–Blancan), ~ 16–2 Ma

Extinct genus of mammals

Aepycamelus is an extinct genus of camelids from the Middle Miocene to early Pleistocene (Barstovian to Blancan) of North America. Its name is derived from the Homeric Greek αἰπύς, "high and steep" and κάμηλος – "camel"; thus, "high camel"; alticamelus in Latin.

Aepycamelus spp. walked on their toes only. Unlike earlier species of camelids, they possessed cushioned pads like those of modern camels. Its fossils are widely distributed, from Montana to Florida to California.

== Taxonomy ==
When Matthew (1901) found a complete skeleton of a tall Miocene camelid in Colorado, he referred it to his new genus Alticamelus, erected for "Procamelus" altus Marsh, 1894 (a camel species described from a calcaneum found in Neogene deposits in Oregon). Matthew and Cook (1909) erected the species Alticamelus giraffinus for the Colorado specimen after recognizing the A. altus holotype as indeterminate. MacDonald (1956) recognized Alticamelus as a nomen dubium and erected the genus Aepycamelus for species previously assigned to Alticamelus.

The holotype of A. giraffinus (i.e. Matthew's Coloradan skeleton) is now on display at the American Museum of Natural History. Other fossils of the species have since been discovered, and it is one of the most common camelids found in Barstovian sites of the North American Middle Miocene. Though large by camelid standards, A. giraffinus is actually the smallest species of Aepycamelus. Other valid Aepycamelus species include A. bradyi and A. major.

Aepycamelus bradyi is somewhat larger and younger than A. giraffinus, and is found in Clarendonian-age sites. Even so, it is much rarer than A. giraffinus.

A. major is the youngest and largest species, most common in the Late Miocene (late Clarendonian and Hemphillian stages). Dalquest (1975) named the genus Blancocamelus for a long-legged Blancan (Pliocene to early Pleistocene) camelid from Texas. Its type species is Blancocamelus meadei. Often considered a separate genus from Aepycamelus, Prothero et al. (2026) regarded Blancocamelus as a synonym of A. major.

== Palaeobiology ==
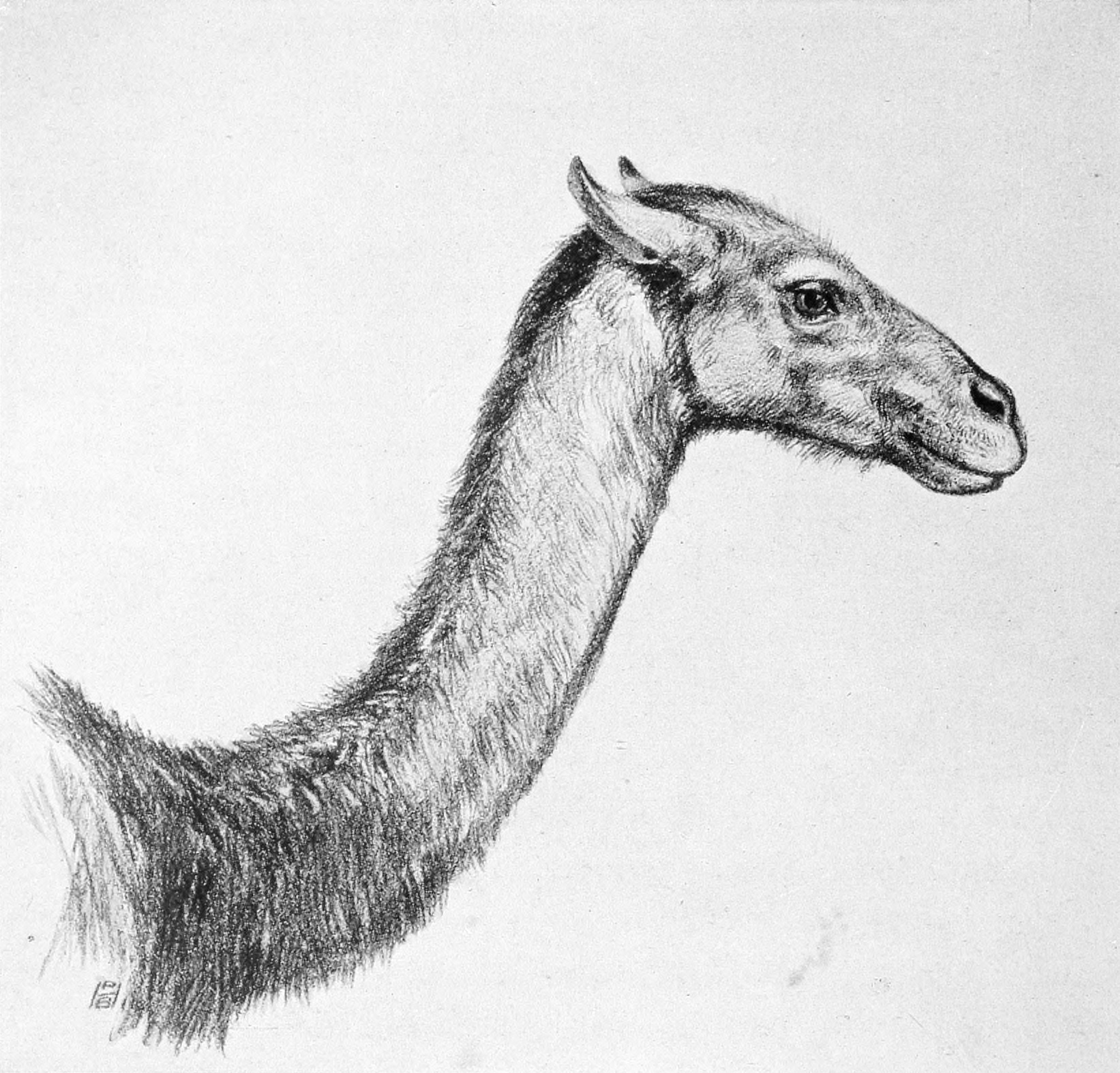
Restoration of A. elrodi (= A. giraffinus) by Robert Bruce Horsfall

Aepycamelus was a prairie dweller of North America (Colorado, etc.). It was a highly specialised animal. Its head was relatively small compared with the rest of its body, its neck was long, as a result of giraffe-like lengthening of the cervical vertebrae, and its legs were long and stilt-like, with the elbow and knee joints on the same level. The top of its head was about 3 m (9.8 ft) above the ground. It was not cursorial, unlike many other camelids.

Its strange body structure gives information on its mode of life and habits. Aepycamelus obviously inhabited dry grasslands with groups of trees. It is presumed to have moved about singly or in small groups, like today's giraffes, and like them, browsed high up in the trees. In this respect, it had no competitors. It survived a relatively long time, through the entire latter half of the Miocene epoch, and died out possibly due to climatic changes.

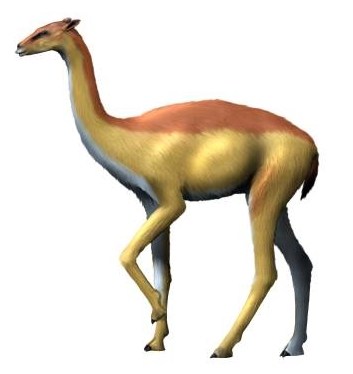
Life reconstruction of Aepycamelus giraffinus
