= Plionictis =

Plionictis Temporal range: Miocene (late Hemingfordian–Clarendonian)
- Illustrated skull of Plionictis ogygia

Scientific classification
- Kingdom: Animalia
- Phylum: Chordata
- Class: Mammalia
- Order: Carnivora
- Family: Mustelidae
- Tribe: Ischyrictini
- Genus: †Plionictis; Matthew, 1924

Type species
- Mustela ogygia Matthew, 1901

Extinct genus of mustelid

Plionictis is an extinct genus of "ischyrictin" mustelid from the Miocene (late Hemingfordian–Clarendonian) of North America. Its dental anatomy is similar to Martes (martens), though it is unclear how closely related they are. The main difference is that Plionictis has a first lower molar (m1) talonid which is shorter (from front-to-back) and shallower. It is plausible that most supposed North American Miocene species of Martes actually belong to "ischyrictins" like Plionictis and Sthenictis, and some species have already been reclassified as such.

== List of species ==
From Baskin (1998):

- Plionictis buwaldi? (Merriam 1919)
- Plionictis gazini? (Hall 1931)
- Plionictis kinseyi? (Gidley 1927)
- Plionictis parviloba (Cope, 1877)
- Plionictis oaxacaensis Ferrusquia-Villafranca 1990
- Plionictis ogygia (Matthew, 1901) (type species)
