= Mascall Formation =

Geological formation in Oregon, United States

- Stratigraphic range: Hemingfordian-Barstovian; ~20.4–13.6 Ma
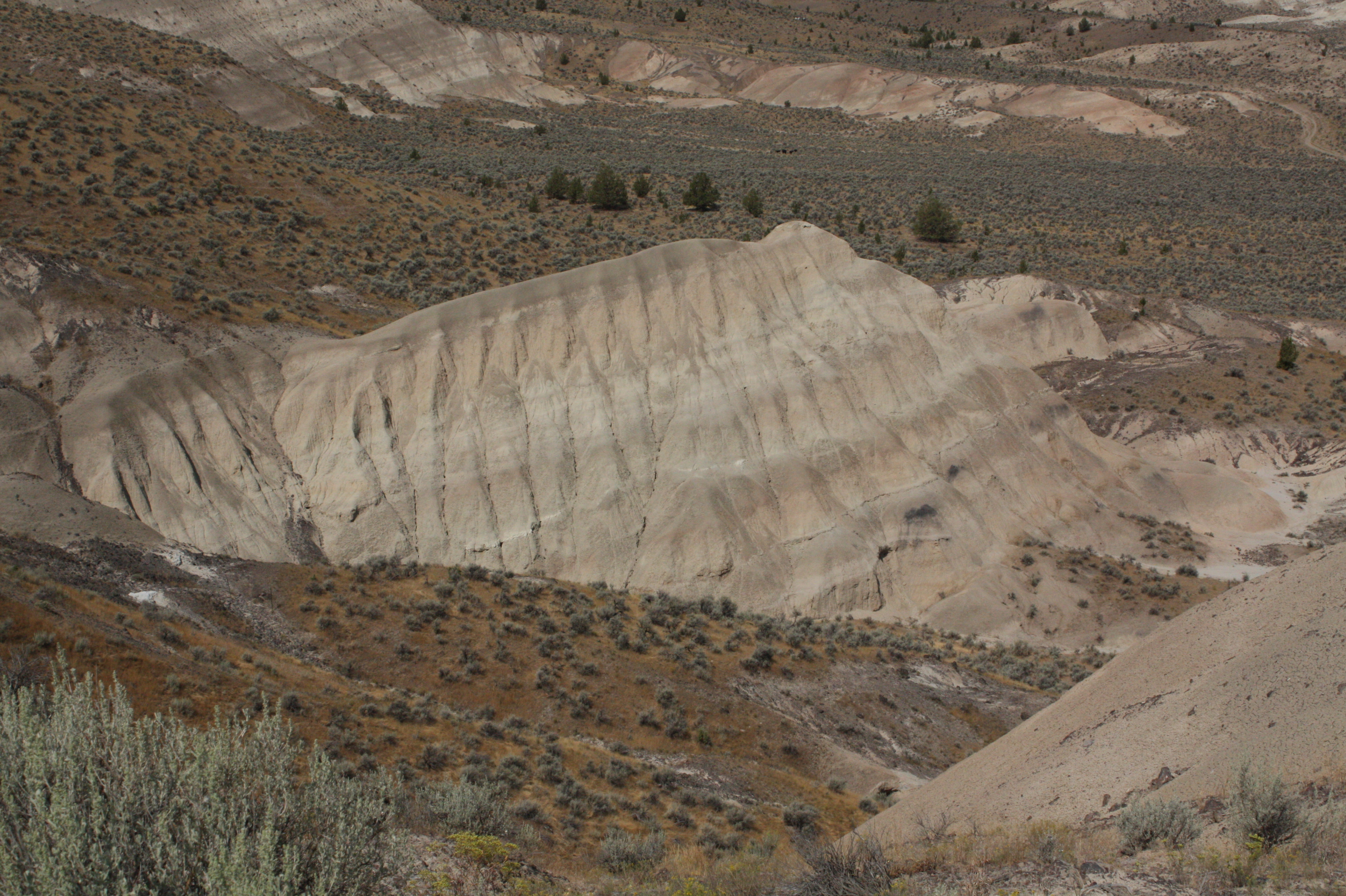
- Outcrop near Picture Gorge
- Type: Sedimentary
- Underlies: Rattlesnake Formation
- Overlies: John Day Formation
- Area: John Day Valley, Fox Basin
- Thickness: 2,000 feet (610 m)

Lithology
- Primary: Sandstone, conglomerate

Location
- Extent: eastern Oregon

Type section
- Named for: Mascall Ranch (south of Dayville)
- Named by: J. C. Merriam
- Year defined: 1901

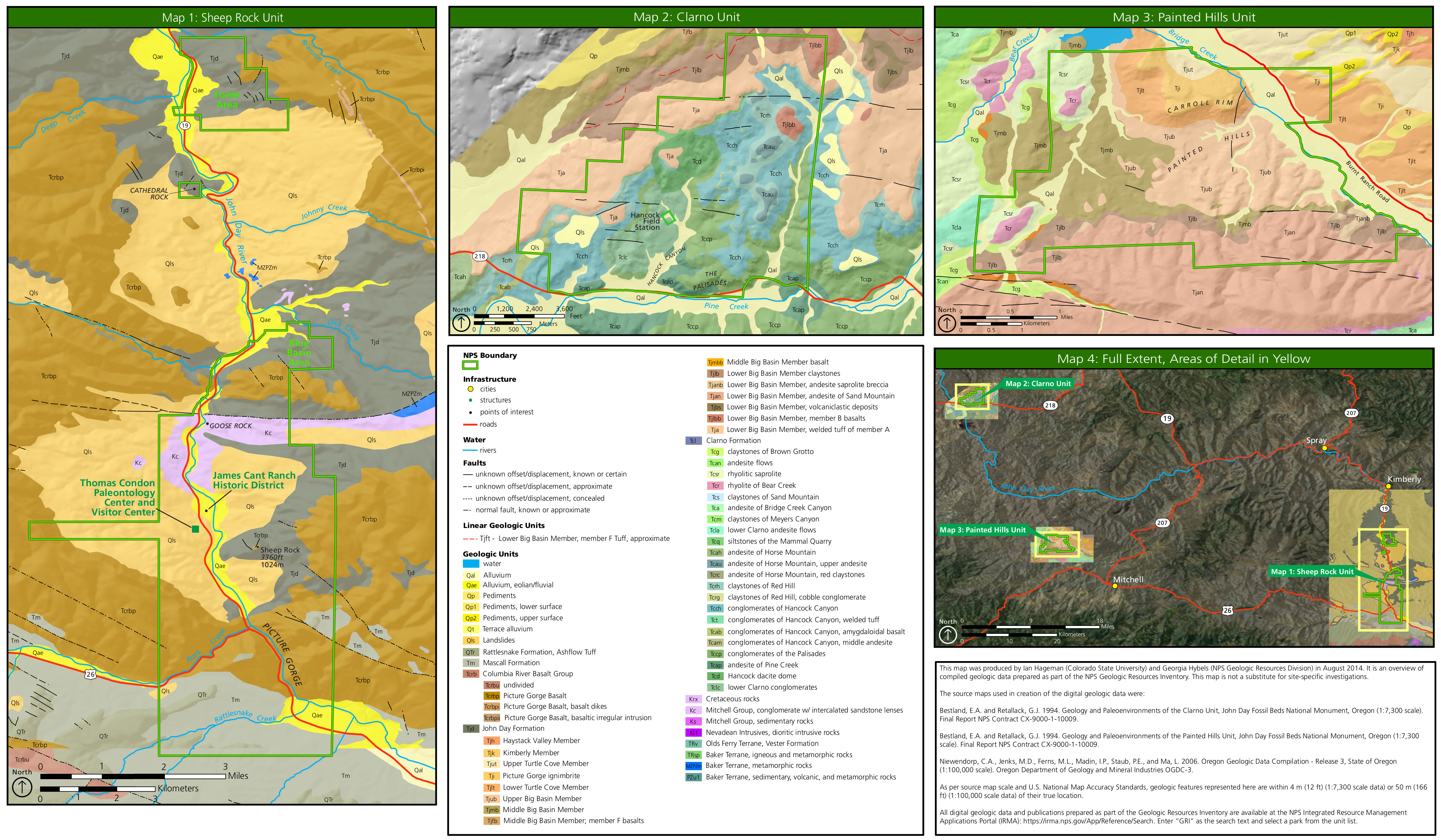
John Day Fossil Beds map

The Mascall Formation is a Miocene geologic formation found along the John Day River Valley of Oregon, in the Western United States.

== Description ==
The formation is described in Geologic Formations of Eastern Oregon (1972) as follows: "The Mascall Formation consists of a maximum of 2,000 feet of fluvial sandstone, ash, light colored water-laid tuff, and well-rounded conglomerate. Within the Mascall Formation is a widespread ignimbrite unit which consists of 97 to 99 percent glass shards and minor amounts of anorthoclase, quartz, magnetite, zircon, and clinopyroxene."

== Age ==
The ignimbrite was radiometrically dated at 13 million years. Parts of the Mascall are interfingered with the Columbia River Basalt Group.

== Fossils ==
Barstovian vertebrates have been recovered from the Mascall.
