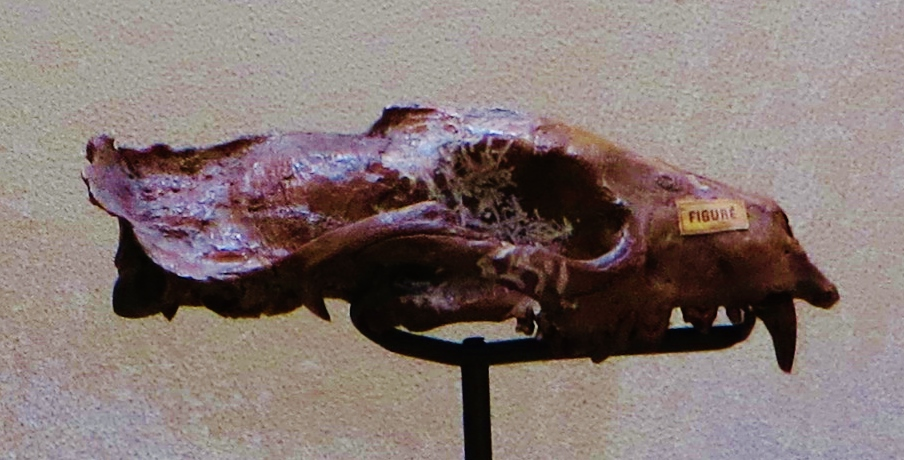
- Skull of Amphictis antiqua

Scientific classification
- Kingdom: Animalia
- Phylum: Chordata
- Class: Mammalia
- Order: Carnivora
- Family: Ailuridae
- Subfamily: †Amphictinae; Winge, 1896
- Genus: †Amphictis; Pomel, 1853

Type species
- †Amphictis antiqua (de Blainville, 1842)

Other Species
- †Amphictis borbonica Viret, 1929; †Amphictis cuspida Nagel, 2003; †Amphictis schlosseri Heizmann & Morlo, 1994; †Amphictis timucua Baskin, 2017

= Amphictis =

Amphictis Temporal range: Late Oligocene–Middle Miocene

Genus of extinct carnivore

Amphictis is an extinct genus of early musteloid which lived from the Late Oligocene to the Middle Miocene, with fossils found in Eurasia and North America for a total of nine described species as of 2017. Though often regarded as an ailurid (part of the red panda family), the interrelationships of the different species as well as their relationship to the other ailurids is not fully understood. Usually Amphictis is classified in the basal monotypic subfamily Amphictinae, but there is no certainty as the genus could potentially be a paraphyletic with the Oligocene species A. borbonica being a potential sister taxon to the ancestor of the subfamily Ailurinae (today consisting just the red panda), while a Middle Miocene clade consisting of an anagenesis line from A. prolongata–to–A. wintershofensis–to–A. cuspida being closer to the ancestry of the now extinct Simocyoninae (with A. wintershofensis being the sister taxon to the clade). This is due to the nature of their plesiomorphic nature of their anatomy.

== Taxonomy ==
The first and type species was originally described as Viverra antiqua in 1842, but was assigned to a new genus Amphictis in 1853. A second species, Amphictis ambigua (sometimes spelled A. ambiguus) was described in 1872. Further species described include A. milloquensis in 1928, A. borbonica in 1929, A. schlosseri and A. wintershofensis both in 1994, and A. prolongata in 1996.

Another species, A. aginensis, was described in 1973 but was reassigned to the genus Stromeriella in 1996. An eighth species, A. cuspida, was described in 2003 and a ninth, A. timicua, in 2017.

Morales et al. (2025) considered Amphictidae to be a valid family of basal musteloids, separate from ailurids. In their study, Amphictis is most closely related to Bonisictis, from the Late Oligocene of Western Europe. Bonisictis is a new genus for "A." ambigua and "A." milloquensis, two species previously classified as Amphictis.
