= Alopecocyon =

Alopecocyon Temporal range: mid-Miocene

Scientific classification
- Kingdom: Animalia
- Phylum: Chordata
- Class: Mammalia
- Infraclass: Placentalia
- Order: Carnivora
- Family: Ailuridae
- Subfamily: †Simocyoninae
- Genus: †Alopecocyon; Camp & Vanderhoof, 1940

Type species
- †Alopecocyon goeriachensis (Toula, 1884)

Species
- †A. goeriachensis (Toula, 1884) †A. getti Mein, 1958

Synonyms
- Ichneugale Jourdan, 1862 (nomen oblitum); Viretius Kretzoi, 1947; Meiniogale Ginsburg, 2002

Extinct genus of carnivores

Alopecocyon is a fossil genus of ailurid belonging to the subfamily Simocyoninae. It has two species, Alopecocyon goeriachensis and Alopecocyon getti. It is based on fragmentary fossils dating to the middle Miocene of both Europe and Asia.

== Taxonomy and evolution ==
The species A. goerichiachensis was first described (but in a different genus) in 1884. The genus was first named in 1940. A second species A. getti was described in 1958.

The species A. getti was proposed to be moved to a new genus Meiniogale by Ginsburg in 2002, but this was rejected by Peigne and Morlo in 2010. The reassignment was followed, however, by Jiangzuo et al. in 2020.

== Characteristics ==
Alopecocyon differed from the earlier Amphictis in that it had relatively larger second molars compared to the first molars.
