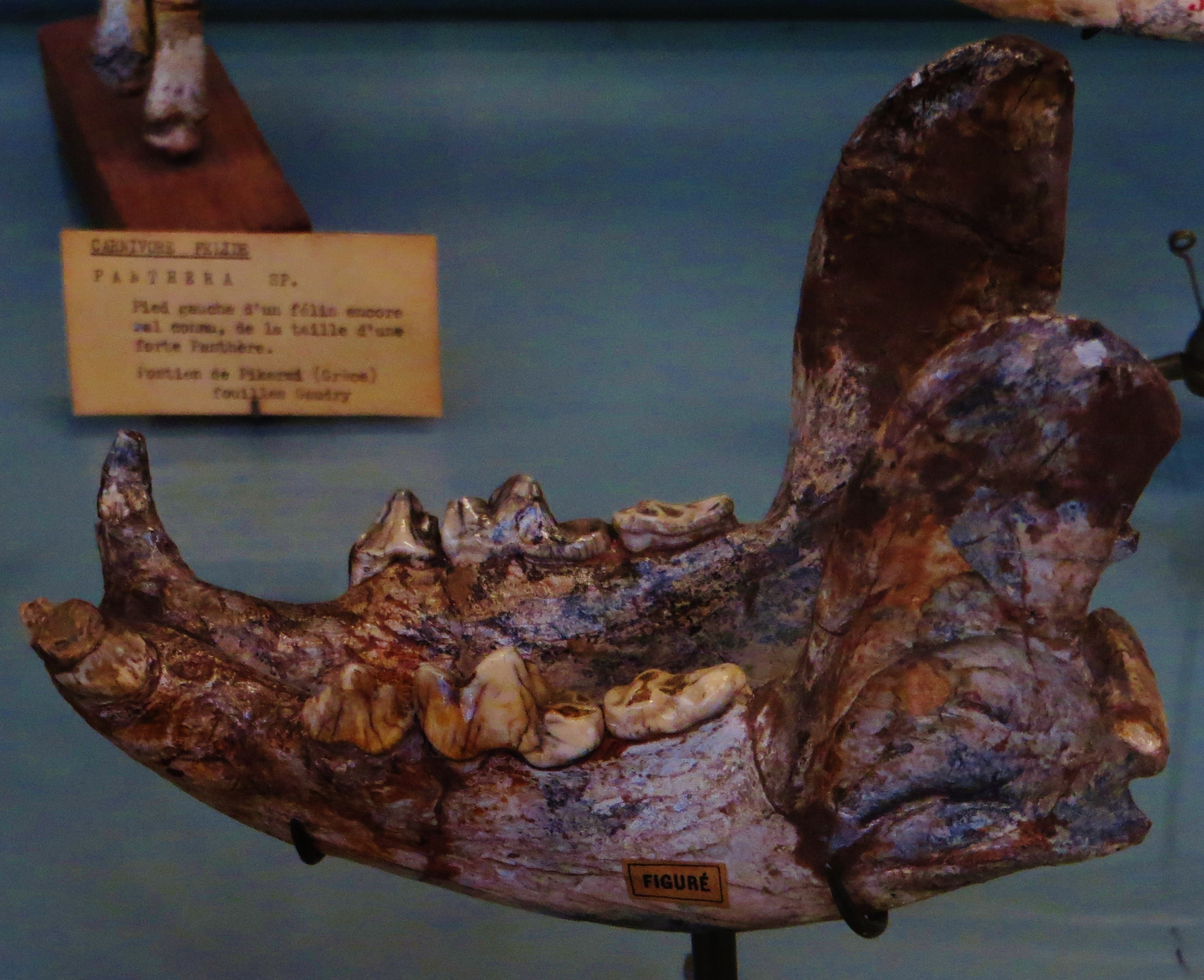
- Simocyon primigenius lower jaw at Musee d'Histoire Naturelle Paris.

Scientific classification
- Kingdom: Animalia
- Phylum: Chordata
- Class: Mammalia
- Order: Carnivora
- Family: Ailuridae
- Subfamily: †Simocyoninae
- Genus: †Simocyon; Wagner, 1858

Species
- †S. batalleri (Viret, 1929); †S. diaphorus (Kaup, 1832); †?S. hungaricus Kretzoi in Kadic and Kretzoi, 1927; †S. primigenius (type species) (Roth and Wagner, 1854)

Synonyms
- Amphalopex Kaup, 1861; Araeocyon Thorpe, 1922; Metarctos Gaudry, 1860

= Simocyon =

Simocyon Temporal range: late Miocene to early Pliocene

Extinct genus of carnivores

Simocyon ("short-snouted dog") is a genus of extinct carnivoran mammal in the family Ailuridae. Simocyon, which was about the size of a mountain lion, lived in the late Miocene and early Pliocene epochs, and has been found in Europe, Asia, and rarely, North America and Africa.

== Classification ==
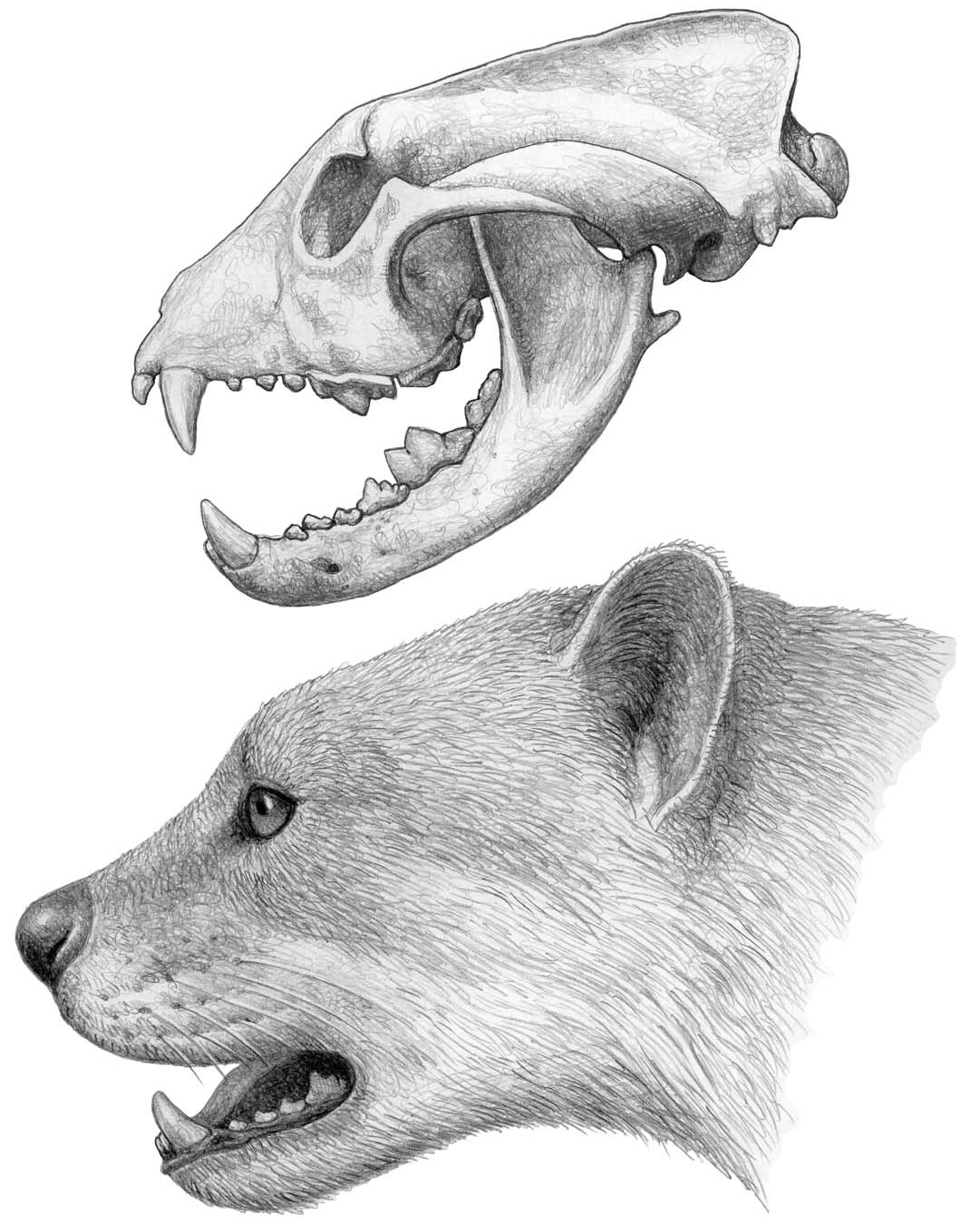
Reconstructed skull and head

The relationship of Simocyon to other carnivores has been controversial, but studies of the structure of its ear, teeth, and ankle now indicate that its closest living relative is the red panda, Ailurus, although it is different enough to be classified in a separate subfamily (Simocyoninae) along with related genera Alopecocyon and Actiocyon.

The species Simocyon diaphorus was described in 1832.

== Palaeoecology ==
While the red panda is primarily herbivorous, the teeth and skull of Simocyon indicate that it was carnivorous, and it may have engaged in some bone-crushing, like living hyenas. The skeleton of Simocyon indicates that, like the red panda, it could climb trees, although it probably also spent considerable time on the ground. Simocyon and Ailurus both have a radial sesamoid, an unusual bone in the wrist that acts as a false thumb. Because Simocyon is considered carnivorous, the presence of a false thumb suggests that this structure likely evolved for climbing rather than for bamboo grasping and feeding. Its competitors during its time period were ailuropodine and tremarctine bears, nimravid false cats, and early canids and felids.

== Bibliography ==
- Fabre, Anne-Claire; Salesa, Manuel J.; Cornette, Raphael; Antón, Mauricio; Morales, Jorge; Peigné, Stéphane (2015). "Quantitative inferences on the locomotor behaviour of extinct species applied to Simocyon batalleri (Ailuridae, Late Miocene, Spain)". The Science of Nature. 102 (5–6): 30. Bibcode:2015SciNa.102...30F. doi:10.1007/s00114-015-1280-9. PMID 25968493. S2CID 253632525.
- Tedrow, A. R.; Baskin, J. A.; Robinson, S. F.; Gillette, D. D. (1999). "An additional occurrence of Simocyon (Mammalia, Carnivora, Procyonidae) in North America". Vertebrate Paleontology in Utah: 487–493.
- Spassov, Nikolai; Geraads, Denis (2011). "A skull of Simocyon primigenius (Roth & Wagner, 1854) (Carnivora, Ailuridae) from the late Miocene of Karaslari (Republic of Macedonia), with remarks on the systematics and evolution of the genus". Neues Jahrbuch für Geologie und Paläontologie - Abhandlungen. 262 (2): 151–161. doi:10.1127/0077-7749/2011/0188.
- Kullmer, Ottmar; Morlo, Michael; Sommer, Jens; Lutz, Herbert; Engel, Thomas; Forman, Markus; Holzförster, Frank (2008). "The second specimen of Simocyon diaphorus(Kaup, 1832) (Mammalia, Carnivora, Ailuridae) from the type–locality Eppelsheim (Early late Miocene, Germany)". Journal of Vertebrate Paleontology. 28 (3): 928. doi:10.1671/0272-4634(2008)28[928:TSSOSD]2.0.CO;2. ISSN 0272-4634. S2CID 129956051.
