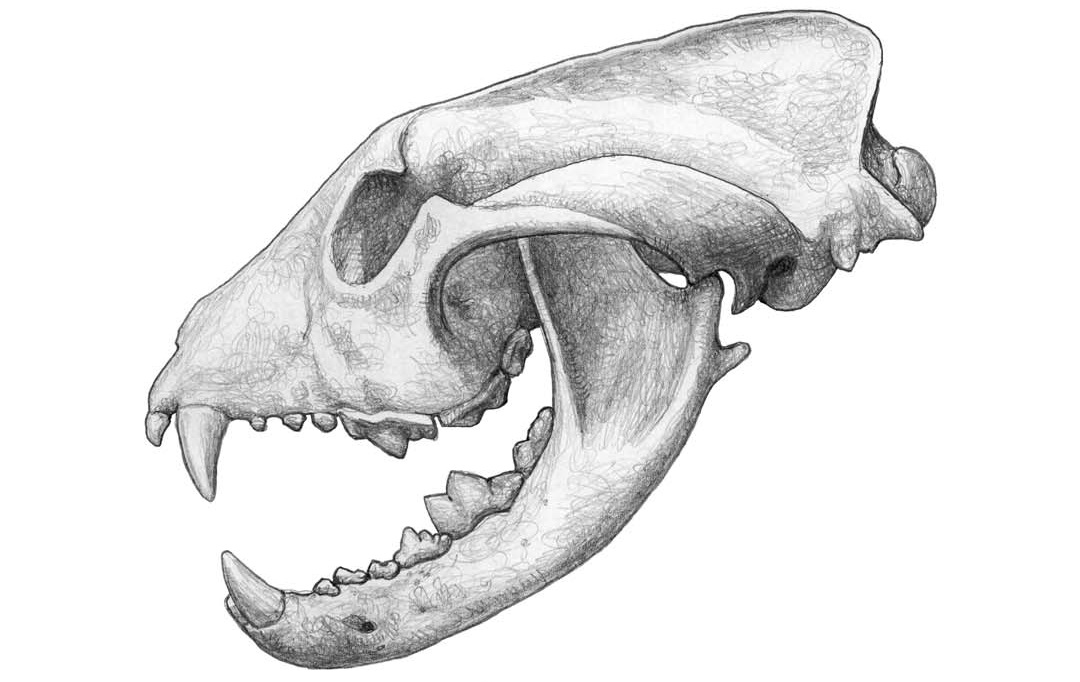
- Illustration of the skull from the genus Simocyon

Scientific classification
- Kingdom: Animalia
- Phylum: Chordata
- Class: Mammalia
- Infraclass: Placentalia
- Order: Carnivora
- Family: Ailuridae
- Subfamily: †Simocyoninae; Dawkins, 1868

Genera
- †Actiocyon; †Alopecocyon; †Protursus?; †Simocyon

= Simocyoninae =

Simocyoninae Temporal range: Middle Miocene–Early Pliocene

Extinct subfamily of carnivores

Simocyoninae is an extinct subfamily of Ailuridae (of which the only recent member is the red panda). The taxonomic history of this group was complicated, as researchers placed various fossil caniform genera into the subfamily. In addition to Simocyon, there was also Oligobunis (an early mustelid), Cephalogale (a stem-bear), and Enhydrocyon (a hesperocyonine canid). This subfamily was initially classified within the Canidae or dog family. This idea went even further in 1910 when American paleontologist Henry Fairfield Osborn considered dholes, African wild dogs, and bush dogs to be the only extant representation left of the simocyonines. This was in large part to the overall similarity in the morphology of their molars, which suggested a shared ancestry of hypercarnivory. This view point was not supported by European paleontologists who believed that Simocyon was more closely related to musteloids. Soon the Simocyoninae were found as extinct subfamily of procyonids, or members of the raccoon-family, due to similarity of the basicranium of these animals. This was supported by subsequent researchers. It was not until a more completed skull of a Simocyon found in north Shaanxi, China was described by Wang (1997) who found that Simocyoninae is closely related Ailurinae on the basis of cranial and dental characteristics.

Characteristics of the simocyonines that differentiate them from the ailurines are highly specialized premolars that enabled them to crush bone. This suggests the simocyonines were either specialized bone-crushing carnivorans like hyenas or were at least able to digest bone in their diet when consuming whole small animal prey. However it was not as fully developed as the aforementioned hyenas.
