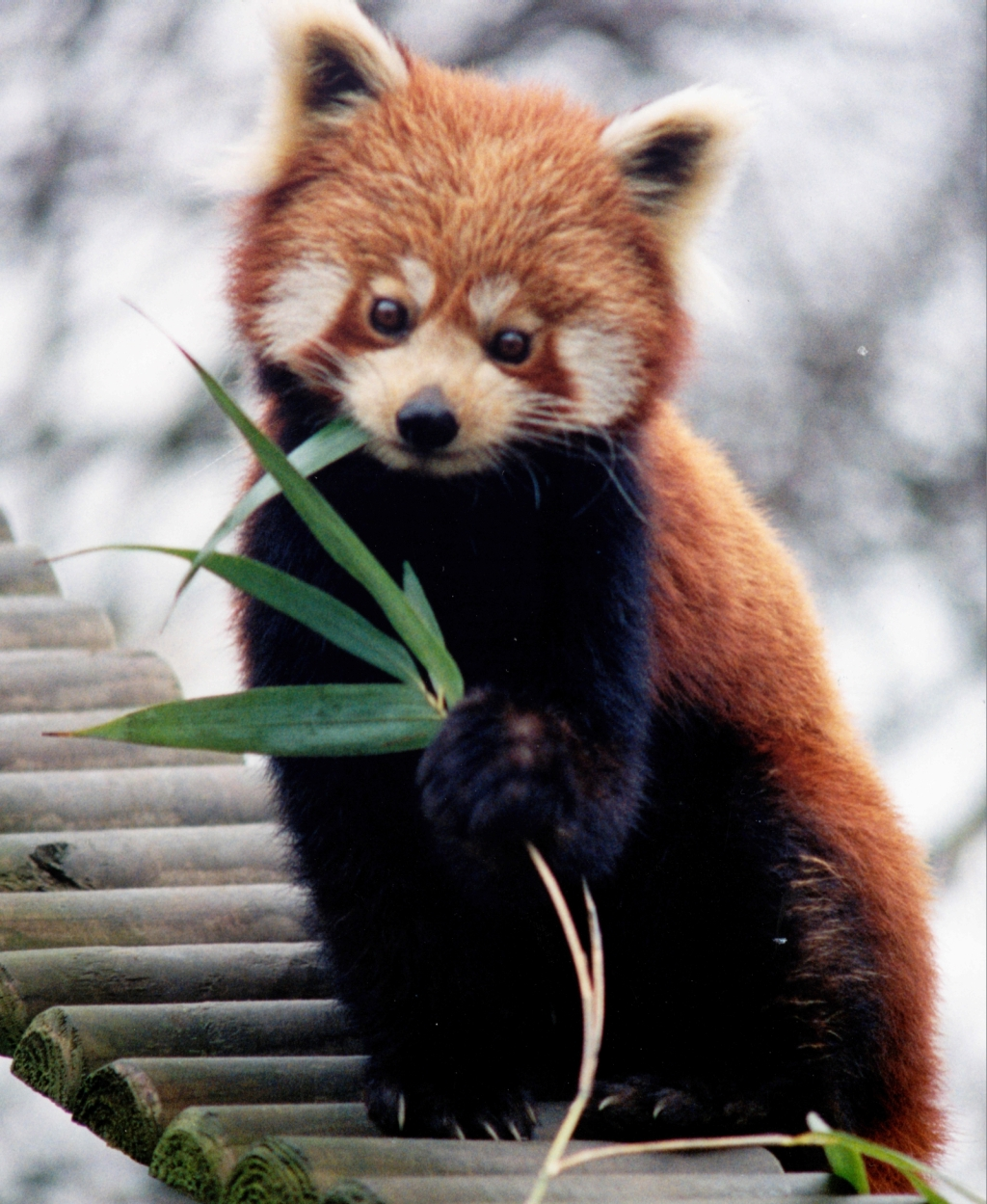
- Red panda (Ailurus fulgens)
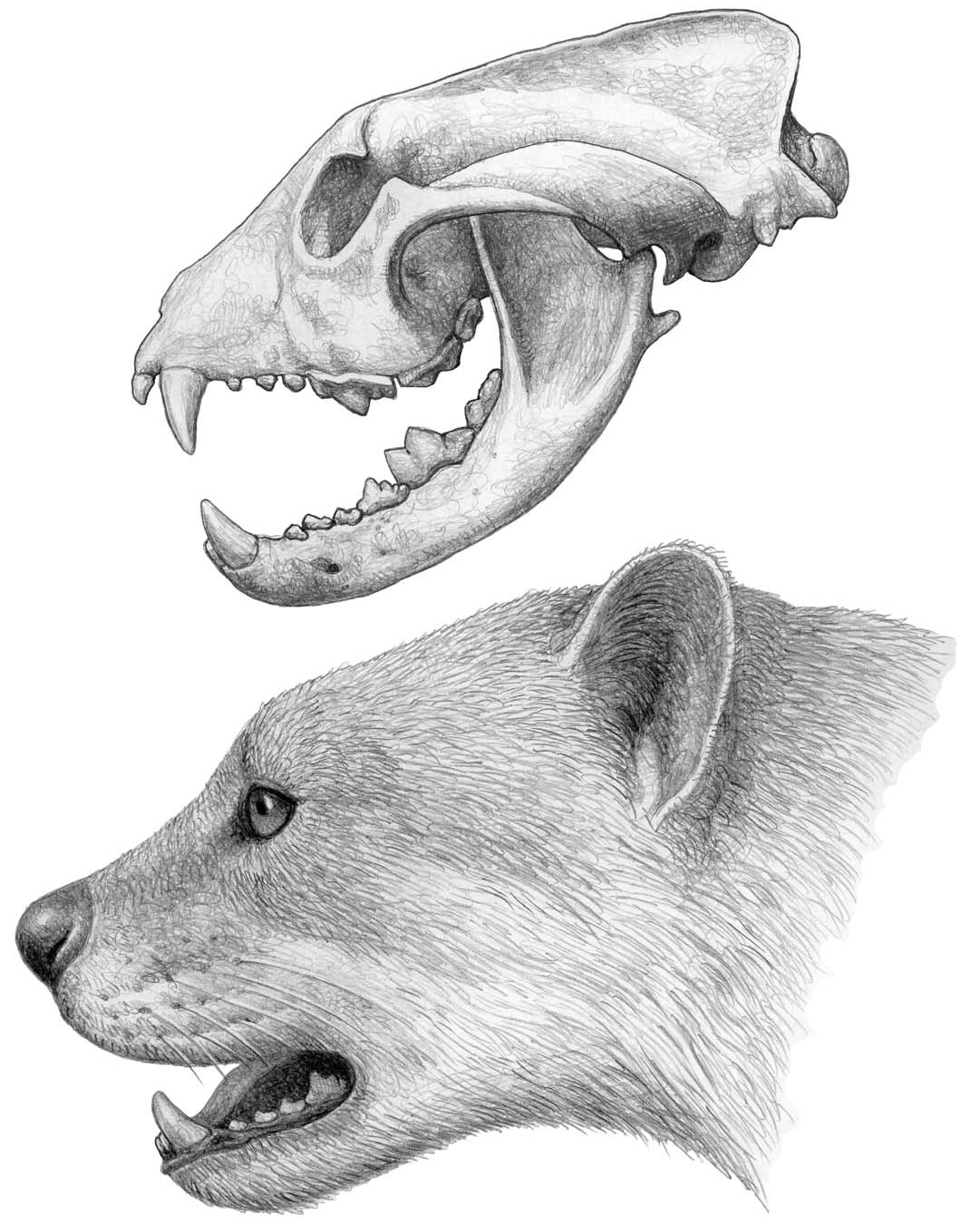
- Skull and life restoration of Simocyon

Scientific classification
- Kingdom: Animalia
- Phylum: Chordata
- Class: Mammalia
- Order: Carnivora
- Superfamily: Musteloidea
- Family: Ailuridae; Gray, 1843

Genera
- †Amphictinae?; Amphictis; Bonisictis; †Magerictinae; Magerictis; Rothictis; †Simocyoninae; Actiocyon; Alopecocyon; Simocyon; Ailurinae; †Parailurus; †Pristinailurus; Ailurus
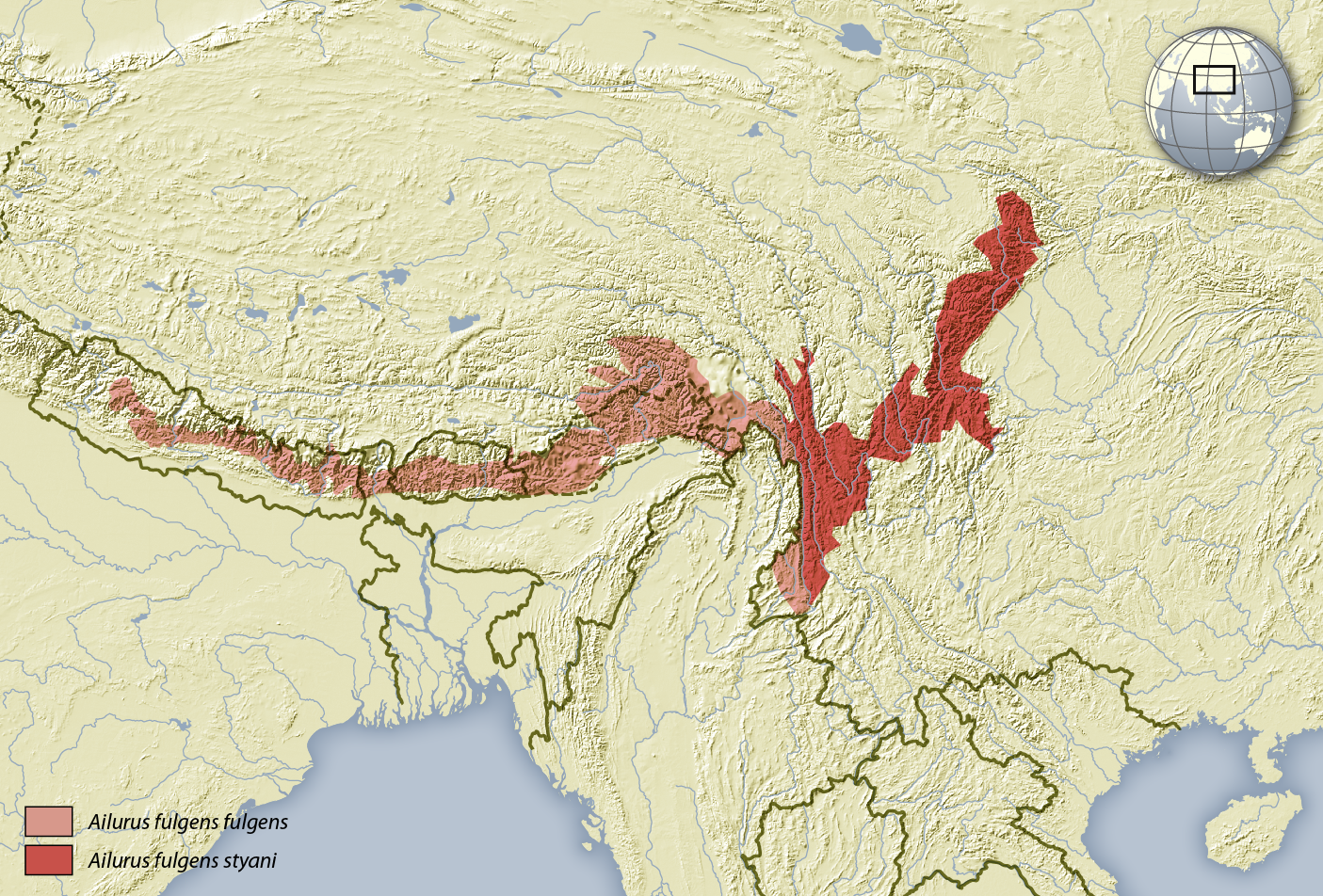
- Extant red panda distribution

= Ailuridae =

Ailuridae Temporal range: Oligocene–Recent

Family of carnivores

Ailuridae is a family in the mammal order Carnivora. The family consists of the red panda (the sole living representative) and its extinct relatives.

Georges Cuvier first described Ailurus as belonging to the raccoon family in 1825; this classification has been controversial ever since. It was classified in the raccoon family because of morphological similarities of the head, colored ringed tail, and other morphological and ecological characteristics. Somewhat later, it was assigned to the bear family.

Molecular phylogenetic studies had shown that, as an ancient species in the order Carnivora, the red panda is relatively close to the American raccoon and may be either a monotypic family or a subfamily within the procyonid family. An in-depth mitochondrial DNA population analysis study stated: "According to the fossil record, the Red Panda diverged from its common ancestor with bears about 40 million years ago." With this divergence, by comparing the sequence difference between the red panda and the raccoon, the observed mutation rate for the red panda was calculated to be on the order of 10^{9}, which is apparently an underestimate compared with the average rate in mammals. This underestimation is probably due to multiple recurrent mutations as the divergence between the red panda and the raccoon is extremely deep.

The most recent molecular-systematic DNA research places the red panda into its own independent family, Ailuridae. Ailuridae are, in turn, part of a trichotomy within the broad superfamily Musteloidea that also includes the Procyonidae (raccoons), the Mephitidae (skunks), and Mustelidae (weasels); but it is not a bear (Ursidae).

Ailurids appear to have originated during the Late Oligocene to Early Miocene in Europe. The earliest known member, Amphictis, was likely an unspecialised carnivore, based on its dentition. Ailurids subsequently dispersed into Asia and North America. The puma-sized Simocyon found in Middle Miocene-Early Pliocene of Europe, North America and China was likely a hypercarnivore. Like modern red panda it had a "false thumb" to aid in climbing. Members of the subfamily Ailurinae, which includes the modern red panda as well as the extinct genera Pristinailurus and Parailurus, developed a specialised dental morphology with blunted cusps, creating an effective grinding surface to process plant material.

== Classification ==
The relationship of the Ailuridae with other carnivorans is shown in the following phylogenetic tree, which is based on the molecular phylogenetic analysis of six genes in Flynn (2005), with the musteloids updated following the multigene analysis of Law et al. (2018).

- Carnivora
  - Feliformia
  - Caniformia
    - Canidae
    - Arctoidea
      - Ursidae
      - - Pinnipedia
        - Musteloidea
          - Mephitidae
          - - Ailuridae
            - - Procyonidae
              - Mustelidae

In addition to Ailurus, the family Ailuridae includes seven extinct genera, most of which are assigned to three subfamilies: Amphictinae, Simocyoninae, and Ailurinae.

- Family Ailuridae J.E. Gray, 1843
  - Subfamily †Amphictinae ?Winge, 1896
    - †Amphictis ?Pomel, 1853
      - †Amphictis borbonica Viret, 1929
      - †Amphictis ambigua (Gervais, 1872)
      - †Amphictis milloquensis (Helbing, 1936)
      - †Amphictis antiqua (de Blainville, 1842)
      - †Amphictis schlosseri Heizmann & Morlo, 1994
      - †Amphictis prolongata Morlo, 1996
      - †Amphictis wintershofensis Roth, 1994
      - †Amphictis cuspida Nagel, 2003
      - †Amphictis timucua J.A. Baskin, 2017
  - Subfamily †Simocyoninae Dawkins, 1868
    - †Actiocyon Stock, 1947
      - †Actiocyon parverratis Smith et al., 2016
      - †Actiocyon leardi Stock, 1947
    - †Alopecocyon Camp & Vanderhoof, 1940
      - †Alopecocyon getti Mein, 1958
      - †Alopecocyon goeriachensis (Toula, 1884)
    - †Protursus Crusafont & Kurtén, 1976
      - †Protursus simpsoni Crusafont & Kurtén, 1976
    - †Simocyon Wagner, 1858
      - †Simocyon primigenius (Roth & Wagner, 1854)
      - †Simocyon diaphorus (Kaup, 1832)
      - †Simocyon batalleri Viret, 1929
      - †Simocyon hungaricus Kadic & Kretzoi, 1927
  - Subfamily Ailurinae J.E. Gray, 1843
    - †Magerictis Ginsburg et al., 1997
      - †Magerictis imperialensis Ginsburg et al., 1997
    - Tribe Pristinailurini Wallace & Lyon, 2022
      - †Pristinailurus Wallace & Wang, 2004
        - †Pristinailurus bristoli Wallace & Wang, 2004
      - †Parailurus Schlosser, 1899
        - †Parailurus anglicus (Dawkins, 1888) [Parailurus hungaricus Kormos, 1935]
        - †Parailurus tedfordi Wallace & Lyon, 2022
        - †Parailurus baikalicus Sotnikova, 2008
    - Tribe Ailurini
      - Ailurus F. Cuvier, 1825
        - Ailurus fulgens - Red panda
          - Ailurus fulgens styani Thomas, 1902 – Eastern red panda
          - Ailurus fulgens fulgens F. Cuvier, 1825 – Western red panda

In 2025, a comprehensive study describing new material of Magerictis imperialensis also reviewed the phylogeny of the entire family; it placed Magerictis and the new genus Rothictis in the new subfamily Magerictinae, recovered Simocyoninae as paraphyletic to the Ailurinae, and resurrected the family Amphictidae for Amphictis and the new genus Bonisictis.

- Family †Amphictidae Winge, 1895
  - Amphictis Pomel, 1853
    - Amphictis antiquus Pomel, 1853
    - Amphictis schlosseri Heizmann & Morlo, 1994
    - The remaining species A. borbonica, A. ageniensis, A. cuspida, A. timicua were stated to be of indeterminate generic status.
  - Bonisictis
    - Bonisictis ambiguus Gervais, 1872
    - Bonisictis milloquensis (Helbing, 1928)
- Family Ailuridae Gray, 1843
  - Subfamily †Magerictinae
    - Magerictis Ginsburg, Morales, Soria, and Herráez, 1997
      - Magerictis imperialensis Ginsburg, Morales, Soria, and Herráez, 1997
    - Rothictis
      - Rothictis prolongata (Morlo, 1996)
      - Rothictis wintershofensis (Heizmann and Morlo, 1994)
  - Subfamily †Simocyoninae Dawkins, 1868
    - Actiocyon Stock, 1947
      - Actiocyon leardi Stock, 1947
      - Actiocyon parverratis Smith et al., 2016
    - Alopecocyon Camp and Vanderhoof, 1940
      - Alopecocyon leptorhynchus (Filhol, 1881) [syn.Alopecocyon goeriachensis]
    - Protursus Crusafont & Kurtén, 1976
      - Protursus simpsoni Crusafont & Kurtén, 1976
    - Simocyon Wagner, 1858
      - Simocyon batalleri Viret, 1929
      - Simocyon diaphorus (Kaup, 1832)
      - Simocyon hungaricus Kadic & Kretzoi, 1927
      - Simocyon primigenius (Roth & Wagner, 1854)
      - Simocyon marshi Thorpe, 1921
  - Subfamily Ailurinae Gray, 1843
    - †Parailurus Schlosser, 1899
      - Parailurus anglicus (Dawkins, 1888)
      - Parailurus tedfordi Wallace & Lyon, 2022
      - Parailurus baikalicus Sotnikova, 2008
    - †Pristinailurus Wallace & Wang, 2004
      - Pristinailurus bristoli Wallace & Wang, 2004
    - Ailurus Cuvier, 1825
      - Ailurus fulgens, the modern red panda

== Taxonomic history ==
The species Ailurus fulgens was described by George Cuvier in 1825.

In 1843, J.E. Gray assigned Ailurus fulgens to the new subfamily Ailurinae.

In 1853, Pomel described the new genus Amphictis for "Viverra" antiqua.

In 1858 the genus Simocyon was described.

The subfamily Simocyoninae was named in 1868 for the genus Simocyon

In 1899 the genus Parailurus was named.

In 1940 the new genus Alopecocyon was described.

In 1947 the new genus Actiocyon was described.

In 1976 the new genus Protursus was described.

In 1997 the new genus Magerictis was described.

An additional, unnamed taxon called only "Ailurinae indet." was described in 2001 based on an upper molar from Four, a Middle Miocene-age locality near Isère, France.

In 2004 the genus Pristinailurus was named.

The new genera Bonisictis and Rothictis were described in 2025, both for species previously assigned to Amphictis. That genus along with Bonictis were assigned to the resurrected family Amphictidae, while Rothictis and Magerictis were assigned to the new ailurid subfamily Magerictinae.
