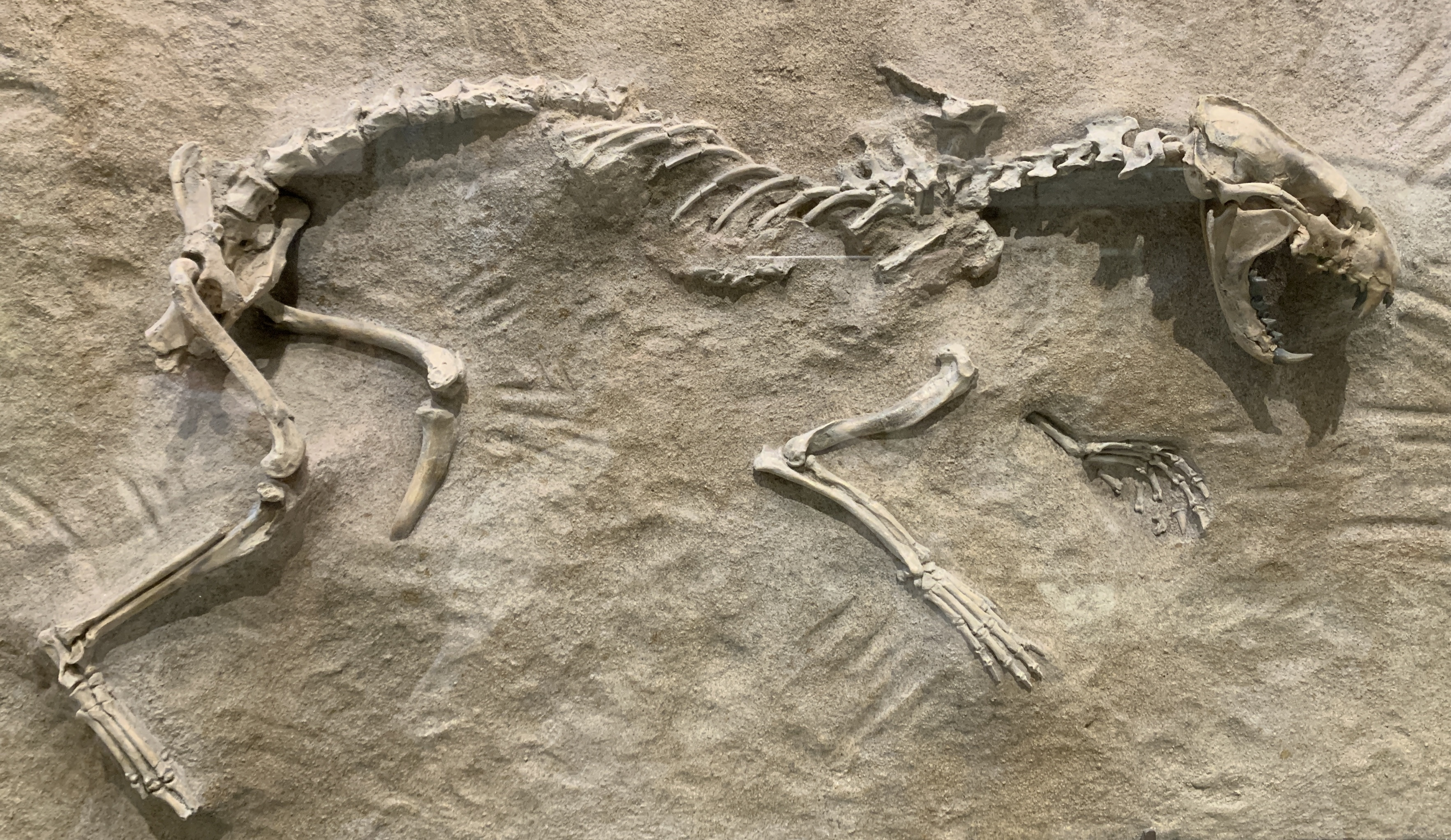
- Sthenictis sp. cast of a specimen from Cherry County, Nebraska. At the AMNH.
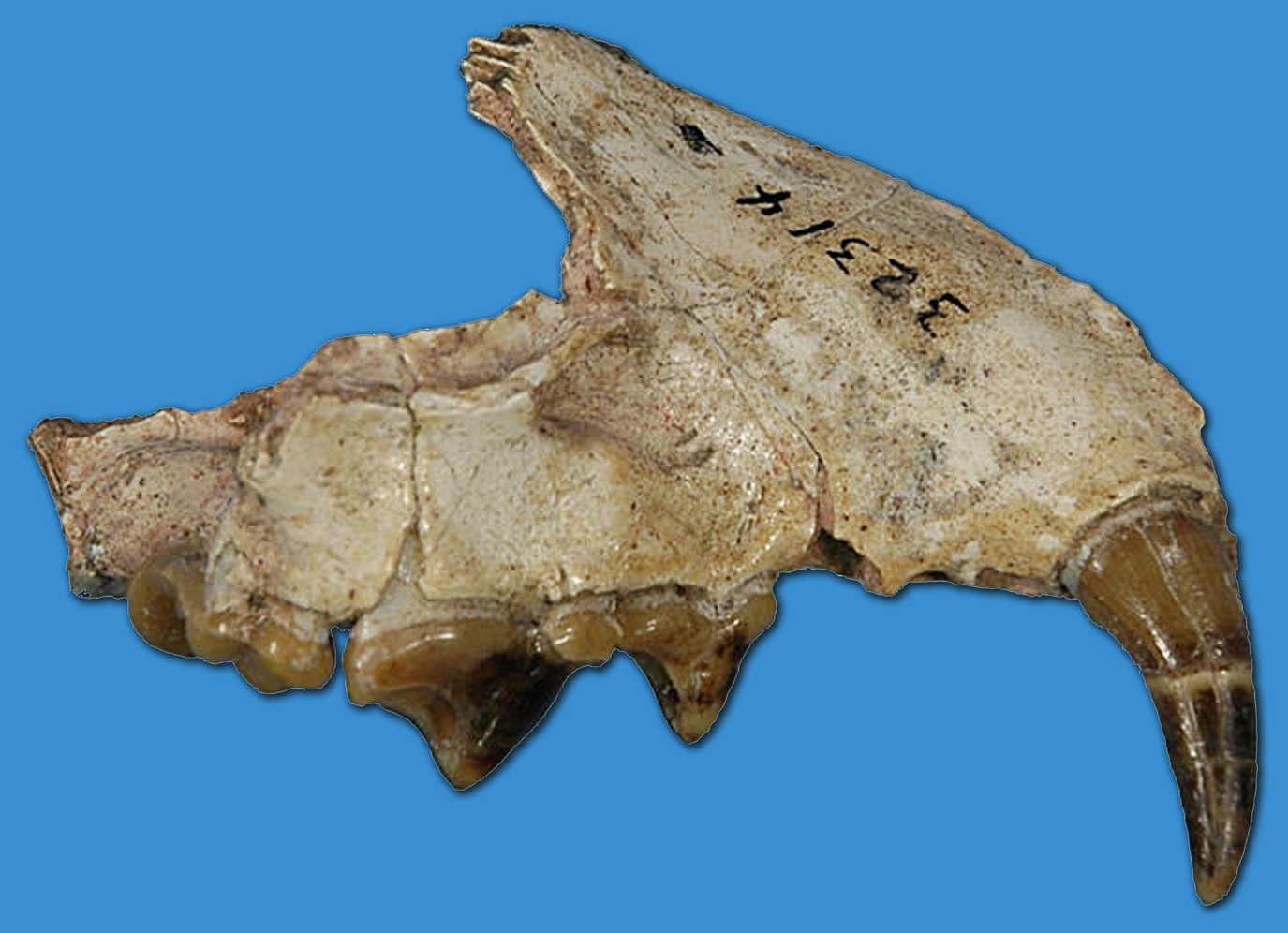
- Sthenictis campestris jaw

Scientific classification
- Domain: Eukaryota
- Kingdom: Animalia
- Phylum: Chordata
- Class: Mammalia
- Order: Carnivora
- Family: Mustelidae
- Subfamily: Guloninae
- Tribe: Ischyrictini
- Genus: †Sthenictis; Peterson, 1910

Species
- Sthenictis bellus Matthew, 1932; Sthenictis campestris Gregory, 1942; Sthenictis dolichops Matthew, 1924; Sthenictis junturensis Shotwell & Russell, 1963; Sthenictis lacota (Matthew & Gidley, 1904); Sthenictis neimengguensis Tseng et al. 2009; Sthenictis robustus (Cope, 1890)

Synonyms
- Brachygale Peterson, 1910

= Sthenictis =

Sthenictis Temporal range: Miocene, ~15.97–5.33 Ma

Extinct genus of carnivores

Sthenictis is an extinct genus in the weasel family (mustelids) endemic to North America and Asia during the Miocene epoch living from ~15.97—5.33 Ma (AEO) existing for approximately 11 million years.

== Fossil distribution ==
The oldest specimen was uncovered at Black Butte, Malheur County, Oregon. Other locations are: Quatal Canyon, Ventura County, California, Kleinfelder Farm, Saskatchewan, Canada, Nebraska, Texas, Florida and in Inner Mongolia, in China.
