= Clarendonian =

North American faunal stage

The Clarendonian North American Stage on the geologic timescale is the North American faunal stage according to the North American Land Mammal Ages chronology (NALMA), typically set from 13,600,000 to 10,300,000 years BP, a period of 3.3 million years.

It is usually considered to overlap the Serravallian age of the Middle Miocene and the Tortonian age of the Late Miocene. The Clarendonian is preceded by the Barstovian and followed by the Hemphillian NALMA stages.

== Subdivisions ==
The Clarendonian can be further divided into the substages of:

- Late/Upper Clarendonian: Lower boundary source of the base of the Clarendonian (approximate)
- Early/Lower Clarendonian (shares lower boundary)
