= Alachua Formation =

Miocene geologic formation in Florida

- Stratigraphic range: Early-Late Miocene (Hemingfordian-Hemphillian); ~20–5.3 Ma
- Type: Formation

Lithology
- Primary: Claystone, sandstone
- Other: Phosphorite

Location
- Coordinates: 29.7°N 82.6°W
- Approximate paleocoordinates: 29.8°N 80.9°W
- Region: Florida
- Country: United States

Type section
- Named for: Alachua, Florida
- Alachua Formation (the United States) Alachua Formation (Florida)

The Alachua Formation is a Miocene geologic formation in Florida. The claystones, sandstones and phosphorites of the formation preserve many fossils of mammals, birds, reptiles and fish, among others megalodon.

== Fossil content ==
The formation has provided the following fossils.

=== Mammals ===
Rodents

- Harrymys magnus
- Nototamias hulberti
- Petauristodon pattersoni
- Proheteromys floridanus
- cf. Miospermophilus sp.
- Mylagaulus kinseyi
- cf. Texomys sp.
- Lagomorpha indet.
- Mylagaulidae indet.

Carnivora

- Amphicyon longiramus
- Borophagus orc
- B. pugnator
- Cynelos caroniavorus
- Enhydritherium terraenovae
- Epicyon haydeni
- E. saevus
- Eucyon davisi
- Euoplocyon spissidens
- Leptarctus ancipidens
- Metatomarctus canavus
- Oligobunis floridanus
- Osbornodon iamonensis
- Phoberocyon johnhenryi
- Zodiolestes freundi
- Borophagus sp.
- Phlaocyon sp.
- Sthenictis sp.
- Felidae indet.
- Mustelinae indet.

Ground sloths

- Pliometanastes protistus
- Thinobadistes segnis

Gomphotheres

- Amebelodon (Konobelodon) britti
- Amebelodon sp.

Artiodactyls

- Aepycamelus major
- Diabolocornis simonsi
- Floridachoerus olseni
- Floridameryx floridanus
- Floridatragulus dolichanthereus
- Hemiauchenia minima
- Machaeromeryx gilchristensis
- Nothokemas floridanus
- Parablastomeryx floridanus
- Pediomeryx hemphillensis
- Prosynthetoceras texanus
- Synthetoceras australis
- S. cf. tricornatus
- Yumaceras hamiltoni
- Aepycamelus sp.
- Hemiauchenia sp.
- Merycoidodon sp.
- Antilocapridae indet.
- Camelidae indet.
- Ruminantia indet.
- Tayassuidae indet.
- Tayassuinae indet.

Soricomorpha

- Karstala silva
- Miomyotis floridanus
- Primonatalus prattae
- Suaptenos whitei
- Limnoecus sp.
- Chiroptera indet.

Perissodactyls

- Anchitherium clarencei
- Aphelops malacorhinus
- A. mutilus
- Archaeohippus blackbergi
- Calippus elachistus
- Calippus hondurensis
- Calippus maccartyi
- Cormohipparion emsliei
- C. ingenuum
- C. plicatile
- Floridaceras whitei
- Menoceras barbouri
- Nannippus aztecus
- N. morgani
- N. westoni
- Neohipparion trampasense
- Parahippus leonensis
- Protohippus gidleyi
- Pseudhipparion skinneri
- Tapirus webbi
- Teleoceras proterum
- Hipparion cf. tehonense
- cf. Astrohippus sp.
- Dinohippus sp.

Sirenians

- Metaxytherium cf. floridanum

Lipotyphla

- Talpidae indet.

Theriiformes

- Vespertilionidae indet.

=== Birds ===
- Anhinga grandis
- A. subvolans
- Boreortalis laesslei
- Ereunetes rayi
- Jacana farrandi
- Nycticorax fidens
- Phalacrocorax wetmorei
- Promilio brodkorbi
- P. epileus
- P. floridanus
- Rhegminornis calobates
- Thomasococcyx philohippus
- Anatidae indet.
- Cuculidae indet.

=== Reptiles ===
Turtles

- Floridemys nana
- Hesperotestudo turgida
- Macrochelys auffenbergi
- Pseudemys caelata
- P. carri
- P. williamsi
- Testudo tedwhitei
- Apalone sp.
- Deirochelys sp.
- Pseudemys sp.
- Trachemys sp.

Crocodiles

- Alligator mississippiensis
- A. olseni
- Thecachampsa sericodon
- Alligator sp.

Snakes

- Anilioides minuatus
- Boa constrictor
- Calamagras floridanus
- Ogmophis pauperrimus
- Paraoxybelis floridanus
- Pseudocemophora antiqua
- Pterygoboa sp.

Lizards

- Peltosaurus floridanus
- Gekkonidae indet.
- Scolecophidia indet.

=== Amphibians ===
Anurans

- Bufo praevius
- Hyla goini
- Proacris mintoni
- Scaphiopus (Scaphiopus) holbrooki
- Microhyla sp.
- Rana sp.

Salamanders

- Siren hesterna

=== Fish ===
Sharks

- Carcharhinus brevipinna
- Carcharhinus limbatus
- Carcharhinus leucas
- Carcharhinus plumbeus
- Carcharias taurus
- Cosmopolitodus hastalis
- Galeocerdo aduncus
- Negaprion brevirostris
- Otodus megalodon
- Physogaleus contortus
- Rhizoprionodon terraenovae
- Carcharhinus sp.
- Negaprion sp.

Rays

- Pristis sp.

Others

- Hemipristis serra
- Lepisosteus sp.

== See also ==
- List of fossiliferous stratigraphic units in Florida
- Alajuela Formation
- Chagres Formation
- Goliad Formation
- Shoal River Formation
- Tuira Formation
