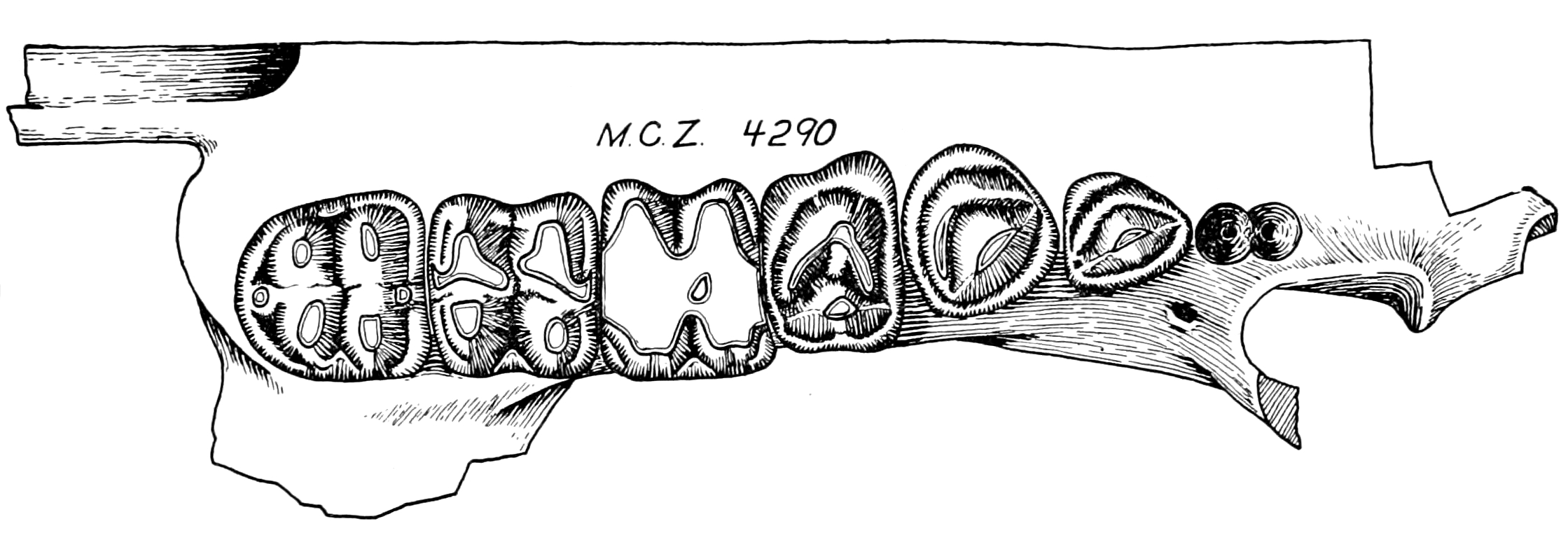

Scientific classification
- Kingdom: Animalia
- Phylum: Chordata
- Class: Mammalia
- Order: Artiodactyla
- Family: Tayassuidae
- Genus: †Floridachoerus; Ted E. White, 1941
- Species: †F. olseni

Binomial name
- †Floridachoerus olseni (Ted E. White 1941)
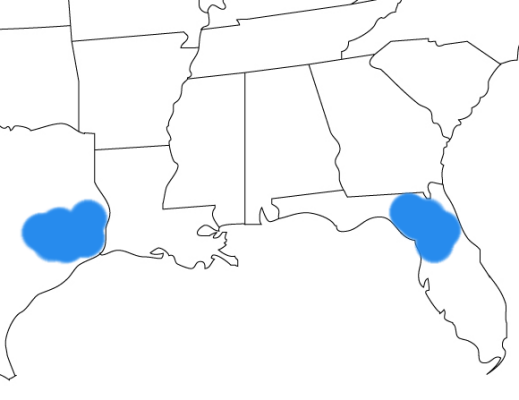

Synonyms
- Desmathyus olseni (Alt. combination)

= Floridachoerus =

Floridachoerus Temporal range: Early Miocene 20.43–15.97 Ma

Extinct species of peccary

Floridachoerus olseni is an extinct peccary that lived during the Hemingfordian age of the Early Miocene, and was endemic to North America. F. olseni was in existence for approximately 4.46 million years. Remains of this extinct mammal were located at the fossil rich Thomas Farm site in Gilchrist County, Florida (two collections) and Toledo Bend site, Newton County, Texas. Floridachoerus olseni was named after Stanley. J. Olsen of the Florida Geological Survey in 1962. Olsen previously worked at the site for Harvard University.

== Lithology of sites ==
- Thomas Farm site: An ancient sinkhole with an associated cave system not unusual for N. Florida. It's within a calcareous sandstone and blue claystone. The fossils are from multiple horizons including a joint clay; a layer of clayballs, lime sand; a bed of limestone, boulders with gravel and lime sand matrix; and a laminated bluish clay. Most of the material is from the lime sand. The biochronology points to an early Hemingfordian origin through the presence of the ancient bear, Phoberocyon, the mustelid Leptarctus, the rhino Floridaceras, and Metatomarctus, a canid. The Thomas Farm site is located on the Alachua Formation.
- Toledo Bend site: A coarse palaeochannel fill; a conglomerate likely from an episode of violent flood mixing of materials. (Albright, 1999). Also recovered with several mammals including two other Tayassuidae (Marshochoerus, Hesperhys) three species of rhino, two species of horse, the Dinohyus, Daphoedon, and Nothokemas.
