= Synthetoceratinae =

Synthetoceratinae Temporal range: Miocene

Scientific classification
- Domain: Eukaryota
- Kingdom: Animalia
- Phylum: Chordata
- Class: Mammalia
- Order: Artiodactyla
- Family: †Protoceratidae
- Subfamily: †Synthetoceratinae; Frick (1937)

Tribes and Genera
- Kyptoceratini; Kyptoceras; Syndyoceras; Synthetoceratini; Lambdoceras; Prosynthetoceras; Synthetoceras

Extinct subfamily of mammals

Synthetoceratinae is an extinct subfamily of Protoceratidae, deer-like herbivorous mammals belonging to the order Artiodactyla. They were endemic to North America during the Miocene epoch, living 23.03—3.9 Ma, existing for approximately 19.13 million years.

== Taxonomy ==
Synthetoceratinae was named by Frick (1937). Its type genus is Synthetoceras. It was considered monophyletic by Webb et al. (2003). It was assigned to Protoceratidae by Webb (1981), Prothero (1998), Webb et al. (2003), Hulbert and Whitmore (2006) and Prothero and Ludtke (2007).

== Tribes ==
Synthetoceratinae contains the tribes Kyptoceratini and Synthetoceratini.

- Tribe Kyptoceratini
  - Genus Kyptoceras
  - Genus Syndyoceras
- Tribe Synthetoceratini
  - Genus Lambdoceras
  - Genus Prosynthetoceras
  - Genus Synthetoceras
