= Kyptoceratini =

Kyptoceratini Temporal range: Miocene

Scientific classification
- Kingdom: Animalia
- Phylum: Chordata
- Class: Mammalia
- Order: Artiodactyla
- Family: †Protoceratidae
- Subfamily: †Synthetoceratinae
- Tribe: †Kyptoceratini; Webb (1981)

Genera
- Kyptoceras; Syndyoceras

Extinct tribe of mammals

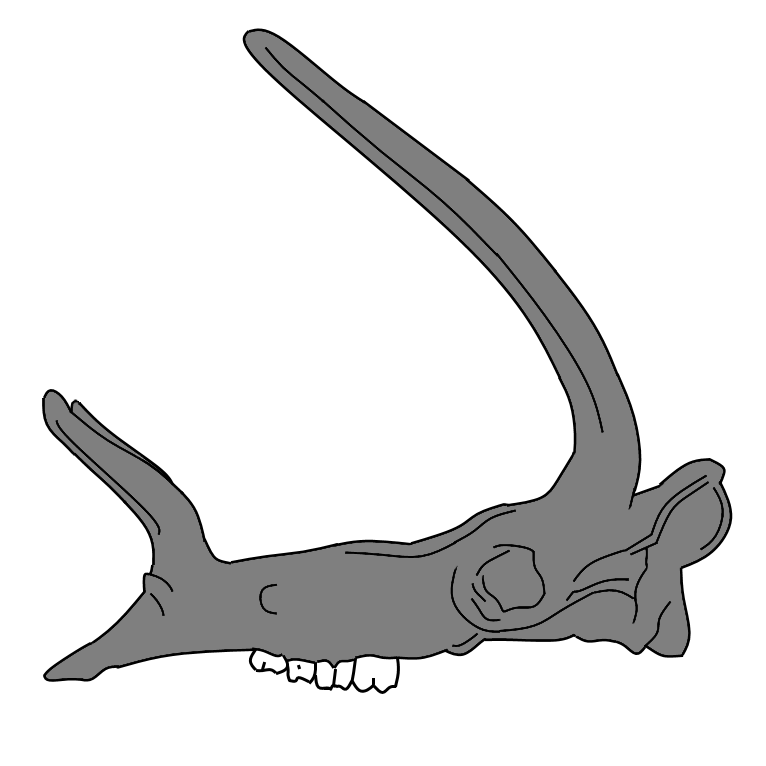
An illustration of the skull of Kyptoceras amatorum

Kyptoceratini is an extinct tribe of the subfamily Synthetoceratinae, deer-like mammals within the family Protoceratidae belonging to the order Artiodactyla, endemic to North America during the Miocene through Pliocene, living 23.03—3.6 Ma, existing for approximately 19.43 million years.

== Taxonomy ==
Kyptoceratini is a sister taxa to Synthetoceratini. Kyptoceratini was named by Webb (1981). Its type is Kyptoceras. It was assigned to Synthetoceratinae by Webb (1981), Prothero (1998), Webb et al. (2003) and Prothero and Ludtke (2007).

== Members ==
Kyptoceras (type genus), Syndyoceras
