= Thomas Farm Site =

Coordinates: 29.8658°N 82.8631°W

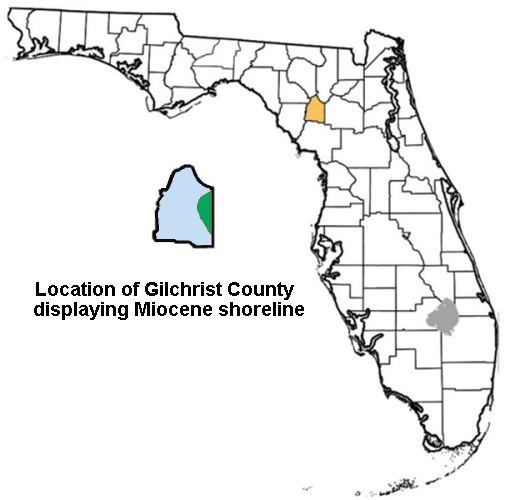
Gilchrist County, Florida and Miocene shoreline based on the Florida Geologic Survey.

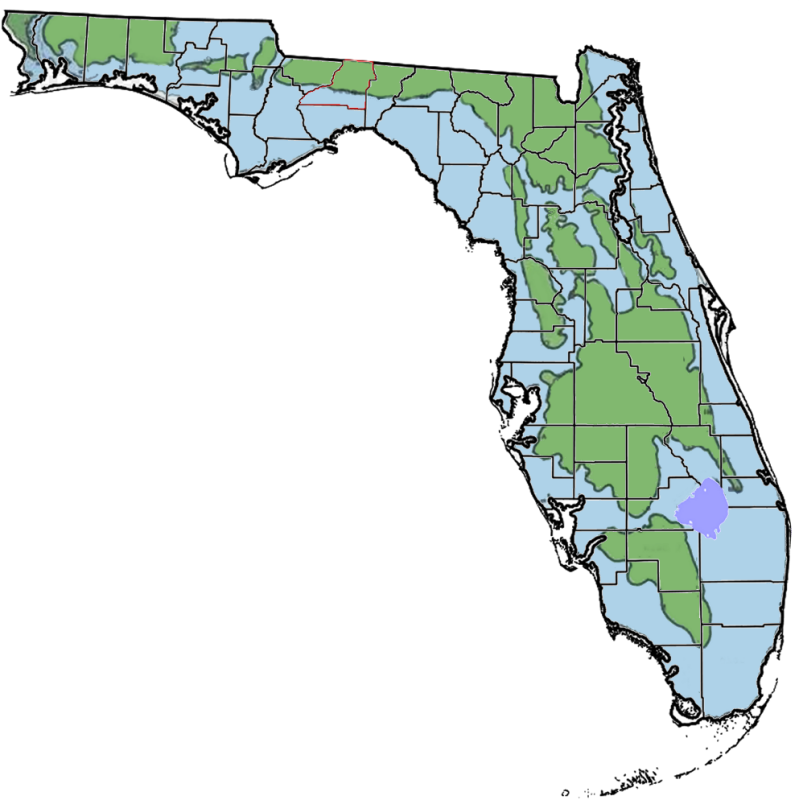
Florida during the Miocene

The Thomas Farm site is an Early Miocene, Hemingfordian assemblage of vertebrate fossils located in Gilchrist County, northern Florida.

The Thomas Farm site is one of the richest terrestrial deposits of Miocene vertebrates in the 18 Ma range found in eastern North America according to the Florida Museum of Natural History. The site was discovered in 1931 by Florida Geological Survey (FGS) staff member Clarence Simpson. Specimens include: amphibians, reptiles, birds, small rodents, bats, rhinoceroses, three species of three-toed horses, several artiodactyls (including camels, peccary, deer-like species and other extinct forms), as well as dogs, bears, and bear-dogs.

== Specimens ==
=== Reptilia ===
- Pseudemys sp.
- Testudo (T. tedwhitei)
- Promilio (P. epileus)
- Promilio (P. brodkorbi)
- Proictinia (P. floridana)
- Alligator (A. olseni)
- Paraoxybelis (P. floridanus)
- Pseudocemophora (P. antiqua)
- Anilioides (A. minuatus)
- Pseudoepicrates (P. stanolseni)
- Ogmophis (O. pauperrimus
- Calamagras (C. floridanus)

=== Birds ===
==== Phalacrocoracidae ====
- Phalacrocorax (P. subvolans)

==== Columbidae ====
- Arenicolumba prattae

=== Mammals ===
==== Rhinocerotidae ====
- Diceratherium (D. barbouri)
- Floridaceras (F. whitei)

==== Equidae ====
- Parahippus (P. leonensis)
- Anchitherium (A. clarencei)

==== Amphicyonidae ====
- Daphoenus (D. caroniavorus
- Amphicyon (A. longiramus)
- Cynelos (C. caroniavorus)

==== Ursidae ====
- Phoberocyon (johnhenryi)

==== Mustelidae ====
- Mephitaxus (M. ancipidens)
- Miomustela
- Zodiolestes (Z. freundi)
- Oligobunis (O. floridanus)

==== Canidae ====
- Osbornodon iamonensis
- Euoplocyon (E. spissidens)
- Metatomarctus (M. canavus)
- Aelurodon (A. johnhenryi)
- Aelurocyon (A. spissidens)
- Phlaocyon sp.

==== Chiroptera ====
- Chiroptera sp.
- Primonatalus (P. prattae)
- Karstala (K. silva)
- Miomyotis (M. floridanus)
- Svaptenos (S. whitei)

==== Artiodactyla ====
- Floridachoerus (F. olseni)
- Machaeromeryx (M. gilchristensis)
- Parablastomeryx (P. floridanus)
- Merycoidodon sp.
- Syndyoceras (S. australis)
- Floridatragulus (F. dolichanthereus)
- Oxydactylus (O. floridanus)
- Nothokemas (N. floridanus)

==== Soricidae ====
- Limnoecus sp.

==== Rodentia ====
- Cricetidae
- Proheteromys (P. magnus)
- Proheteromys P. floridanus)
- Miospermophilus
- Nototamias (N. hulberti)
- Petauristodon (P. pattersoni)
- Mesogaulus
- Mylagaulidae

=== Amphibians ===
- Proacris (P. mintoni)
- Proacris mintoni
