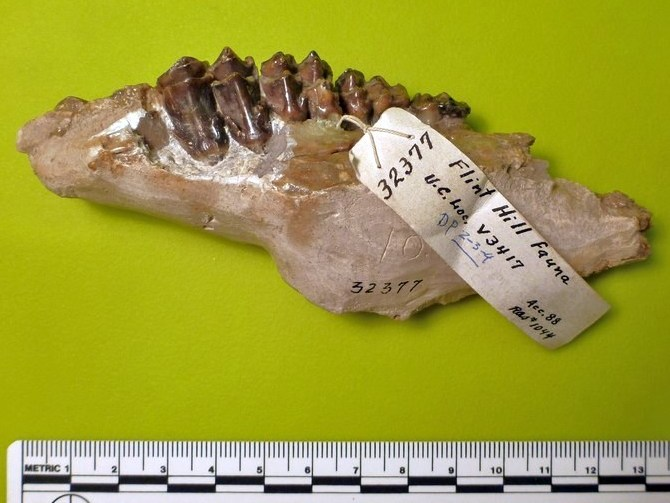

Scientific classification
- Domain: Eukaryota
- Kingdom: Animalia
- Phylum: Chordata
- Class: Mammalia
- Order: Artiodactyla
- Family: †Protoceratidae
- Tribe: †Synthetoceratini
- Genus: †Lambdoceras; Stirton 1967

Species
- Lambdoceras hessei; Lambdoceras siouxensis; Lambdoceras trinitiensis
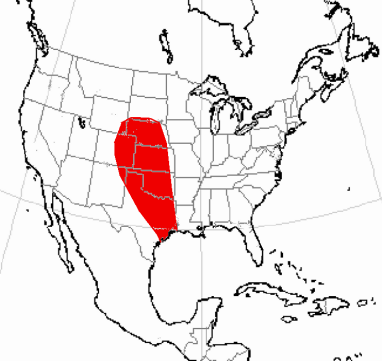
- Range of Lambdoceras based on fossil data

= Lambdoceras =

Lambdoceras Temporal range: Miocene

Extinct genus of mammals

Lambdoceras is an extinct genus of Protoceratidae belonging to the order Artiodactyla (subfamily Synthetoceratinae) endemic to North America during the Miocene, living epoch 20.6—13.6 Ma, existing for approximately 7 million years.

== Taxonomy ==
A description of the genus Lambdoceras by Ruben A. Stirton was published in 1967. It was synonymized subjectively with Prosynthetoceras by Patton (1969), Patton and Taylor (1971) and Patton and Taylor (1973). It was assigned to Protoceratidae by Stirton (1967), Tedford et al. (1987) and Albright (1999); and to Synthetoceratini by Webb (1981), Prothero (1998), Webb et al. (2003) and Prothero and Ludtke (2007).

There are three species; the type Lambdoceras hessei, L. siouxensis, and L. trinitiensis.
