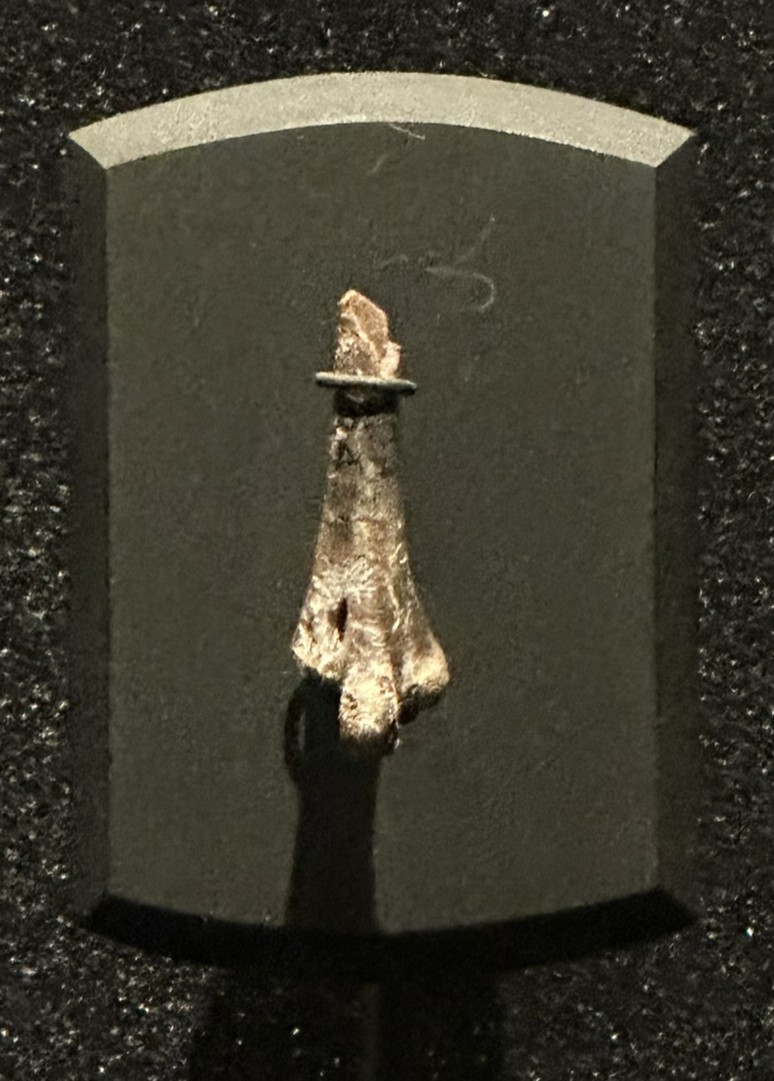
- Holotype specimen (a metatarsal), Florida Museum of Natural History

Scientific classification
- Kingdom: Animalia
- Phylum: Chordata
- Class: Aves
- Order: Galliformes
- Family: Phasianidae
- Subfamily: Phasianinae
- Tribe: Tetraonini
- Genus: †Rhegminornis; Wetmore, 1943
- Species: †R. calobates

Binomial name
- †Rhegminornis calobates Wetmore, 1943

= Rhegminornis =

Rhegminornis Temporal range: Early Miocene

Extinct species of bird

Rhegminornis calobates is an extinct species of turkey from the early Miocene of Florida. It was described by Alexander Wetmore in 1943.

It is known from the Early Miocene (Burdigalian)-aged Alachua Formation of the Thomas Farm site.
