= Synthetoceratini =

Synthetoceratini Temporal range: Miocene

Scientific classification
- Domain: Eukaryota
- Kingdom: Animalia
- Phylum: Chordata
- Class: Mammalia
- Order: Artiodactyla
- Family: †Protoceratidae
- Subfamily: †Synthetoceratinae
- Tribe: †Synthetoceratini; Webb (1981)

Genera
- Lambdoceras; Prosynthetoceras; Synthetoceras

Extinct tribe of mammals

Synthetoceratini is an extinct tribe of the subfamily Synthetoceratinae within the family Protoceratidae belonging to the order Artiodactyla endemic to North America during the Miocene, living epoch 20.6—4.9 Ma, existing for approximately 15.7 million years.

== Taxonomy ==
Synthetoceratini was named by Webb (1981). Its type is Synthetoceras. It was assigned to Synthetoceratinae by Webb (1981), Prothero (1998), Webb et al. (2003) and Prothero and Ludtke (2007).

== Members ==
Lambdoceras, Prosynthetoceras, Synthetoceras
