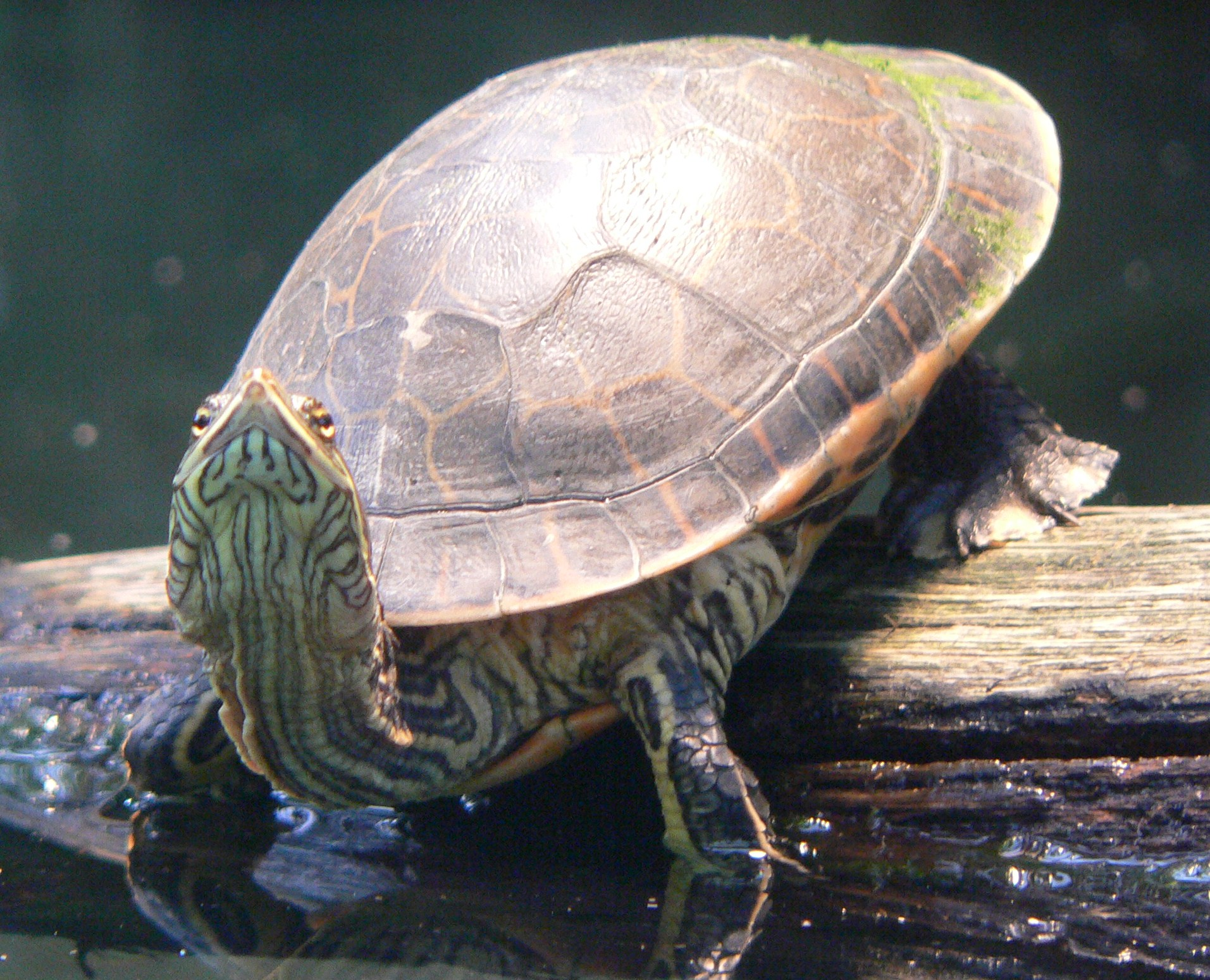
- Chicken turtle (D. reticularia) basking

Scientific classification
- Kingdom: Animalia
- Phylum: Chordata
- Class: Reptilia
- Order: Testudines
- Suborder: Cryptodira
- Family: Emydidae
- Subfamily: Deirochelyinae
- Genus: Deirochelys; Agassiz, 1857

Type species
- Deirochelys reticularia Latreille, 1801

Species
- Deirochelys reticularia; †Deirochelys carri

Synonyms
- Dirochelys Baur, 1890 (ex errore); Dierochelys Löding, 1922 (ex errore)

= Deirochelys =

Deirochelys Temporal range: Miocene - Recent

Genus of turtles

Deirochelys is a genus of freshwater turtle in the family Emydidae, the pond and marsh turtles. It contains one extant species, the chicken turtle (Deirochelys reticularia), which is native to the southeastern United States. A second extinct member, Deirochelys carri, is known from a fossil found in Alachua County, Florida. The genus was first described by Louis Agassiz in 1857, and its name is derived from the Ancient Greek words for "neck" (deirḗ) and "tortoise" (khélūs), referring to the particularly long necks of these turtles.

== Evolution ==
Like other emydids (members of the family Emydidae), Deirochelys' karyotype consists of 2N=50 chromosomes. A 1996 study of various turtles' mitochondrial DNA supported the partition of Emydidae into two subfamilies, Emydinae and Deirochelyinae, with Deirochelys placed within the latter. Deirochelys was reported to be the sister genus to the rest of the subfamily, meaning it shares a common ancestor with the ancestor of all the other genera in Deirochelyinae. Alternative analysis by Stephens and Wiens found that under certain analyses Deirochelys could instead be described as a sister taxon to Emydinae or indeed to the family Emydidae itself. The authors attributed this confusion to long-branch attraction and concluded that Deirochelys did indeed sit within Deirochelyinae. Spinks et al. (2009) also found Deirochelys to be a sister to Emydidae under maximum parsimony.

It has been proposed that Deirochelys and the painted turtles Chrysemys are among the most ancient emydids, having diverged from the rest of the emydids more than 24.4 million years ago. The genus Deirochelys itself is thought to have evolved before the end of the Clarendonian, over 10.3 million years ago.

Bickham, et al. 1996

- Emydidae
  - Emydinae
  - - Deirochelyinae
      - Deirochelys
      - - Chrysemys
        - Pseudemys
        - - Malaclemys
          - - Graptemys
            - Trachemys

Spinks, et al. 2009

- Testudinoidea
  - Deirochelys
  - Emydidae
    - Deirochelyinae
    - Emydinae

== Species ==
There are two currently accepted species:

- Deirochelys reticularia (chicken turtle)
- Deirochelys carri

A possible third species, D. floridana, was described by Oliver Perry Hay in 1908 from a fossil specimen. In 1964, C.G. Jackson determined the specimen to instead be D. reticularia, but in 1974 he reassigned it to the genus Chrysemys. Jasinski (2018) reasserted that this turtle did indeed represent a separate species of Deirochelys.
