= Leptarctus =

Leptarctus Temporal range: Miocene (Hemingfordian–Hemphillian)
- Digital skeleton constructed from L. wortmani fossils

Scientific classification
- Kingdom: Animalia
- Phylum: Chordata
- Class: Mammalia
- Order: Carnivora
- Family: Mustelidae
- Subfamily: †Leptarctinae
- Genus: †Leptarctus; Leidy, 1856

Type species
- Leptarctus primus Leidy, 1856

Extinct genus of mustelid

Leptarctus is an extinct genus of mustelid from the Miocene (Hemingfordian–Hemphillian) of North America and Asia. It was a stocky medium-sized hypocarnivore (an omnivore with more plants than meat in its diet), similar to a Eurasian badger or raccoon. Postcranial fossils of L. wortmani, described in 2026, indicate that it was terrestrial, less adapted for burrowing than a badger and less adapted for climbing than a raccoon. Leptarctus was widespread and diverse, with many species throughout North America and one species from Inner Mongolia, China.

It is unclear whether Leptarctus and its close relatives (the subfamily Leptarctinae) were crown-group or stem-group mustelids. Its jaw and spine biomechanics are most similar to the American badger among living mustelids. This may reflect close affinities, but it could instead reflect plesiomorphic ("primitive") conditions, since both leptarctines and the American badger occupy early branches of the mustelid family tree.

== List of species ==
- Leptarctus ancipidens (White, 1941) - previously Mephititaxus ancipidens
- Leptarctus martini Lim & Miao, 2000
- Leptarctus mummorum Korth & Baskin, 2009
- Leptarctus neimenguensis Zhai 1964
- Leptarctus oregonensis Stock, 1930
- Leptarctus primus Leidy, 1856 (type species)
  - Synonym: Leptarctus bozemanensis (Dorr, 1954) - previously Hypsoparia bozemanensis
  - Synonym: Leptarctus timmi (Lim & Martin, 2002) - previously Hypsoparia timmi
- Leptarctus progressus Simpson, 1930
- Leptarctus supremus Lim et al., 2001
- Leptarctus webbi Baskin, 2005
- Leptarctus woodburnei Bever & Zakrzewski, 2009
- Leptarctus wortmani Matthew, 1924
  - Synonym: Leptarctus desuii Lim & Martin, 2001
  - Synonym: Leptarctus genowaysi Lim & Martin, 2003
  - Synonym: Leptarctus kansasensis Lim & Martin, 2001
