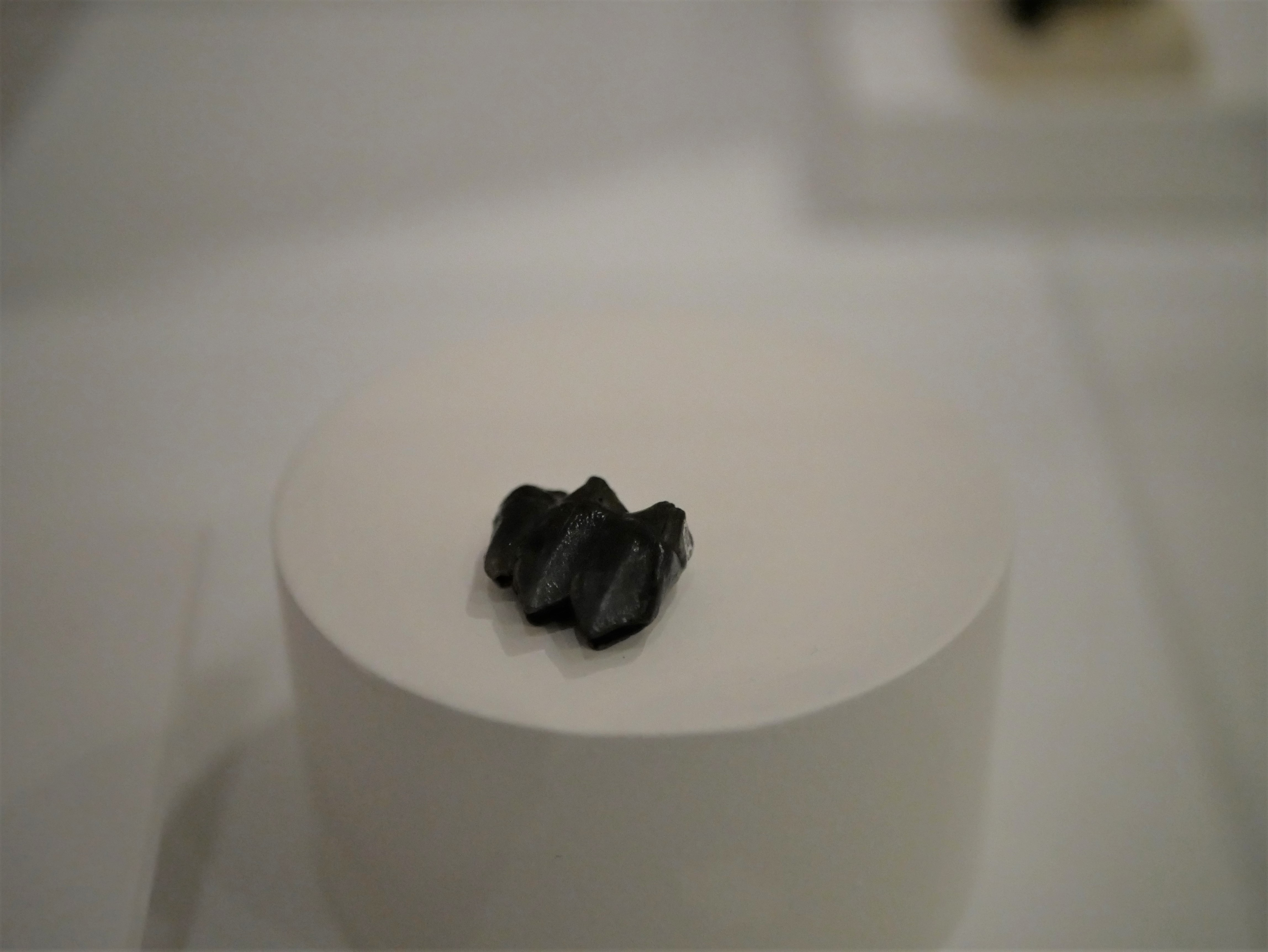
- Fossil tooth of Prosynthetoceras cf. texanus

Scientific classification
- Kingdom: Animalia
- Phylum: Chordata
- Class: Mammalia
- Order: Artiodactyla
- Family: †Protoceratidae
- Genus: †Prosynthetoceras; Patton 1967

Species
- P. francisi Frick 1937; P. orthrionanus Albright 1999; P. texanus Hay 1924
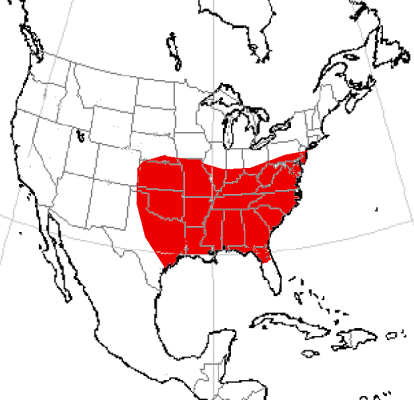
- Range of Prosynthetoceras based on fossil record

= Prosynthetoceras =

Prosynthetoceras Temporal range: Early Miocene–Middle Miocene

Extinct genus of mammals

Prosynthetoceras is an extinct genus of Artiodactyla, of the family Protoceratidae, endemic to North America. It lived from the Early to Middle Miocene 20.6—13.6 Ma, existing for approximately 7 million years. In appearance, Prosynthetoceras looked much like Syndyoceras, Kyptoceras, and Synthetoceras with three horns, one on the snout, and two above the eyes.
