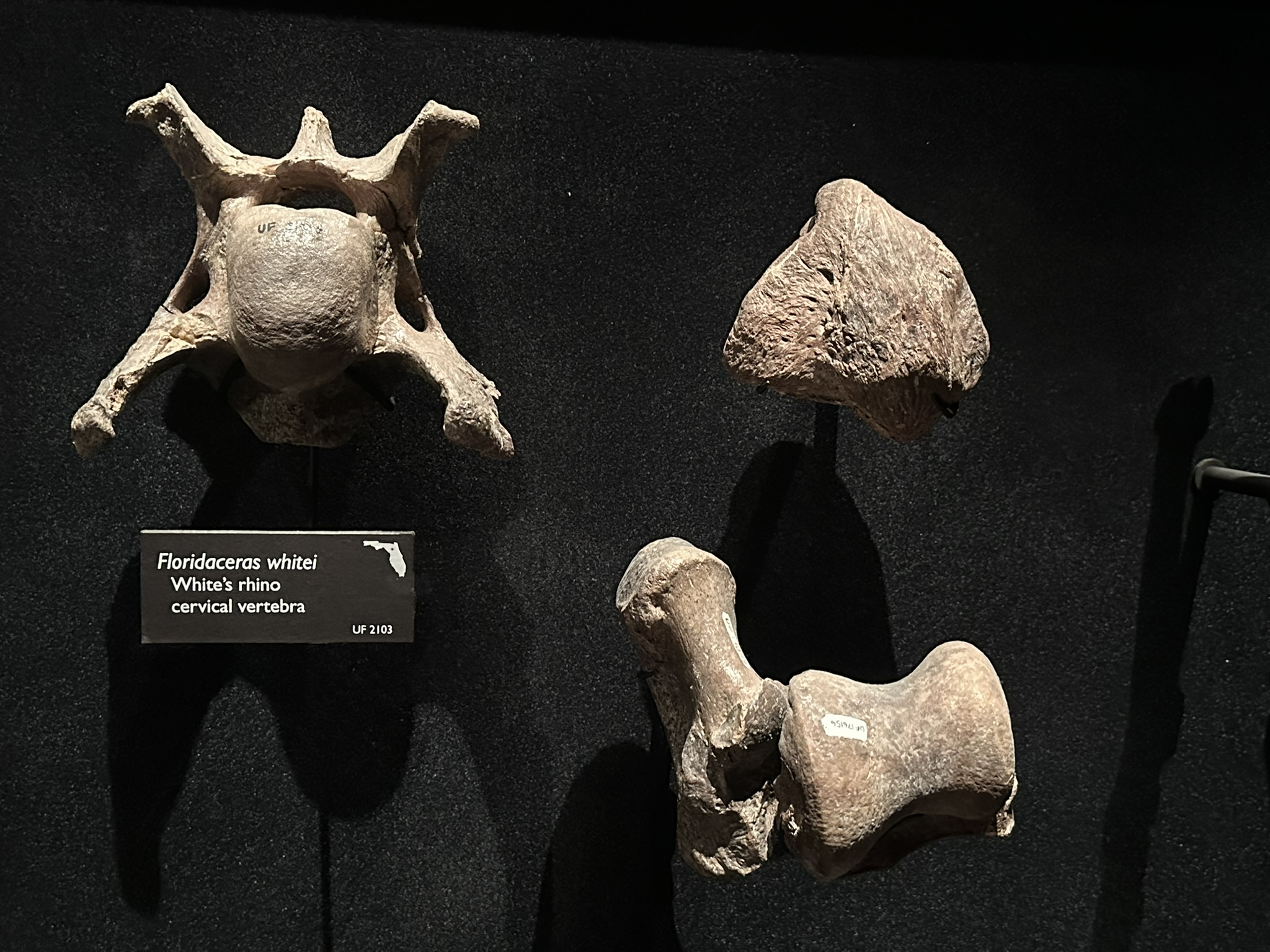
- Fossil vertebrae, Florida Museum of Natural History

Scientific classification
- Kingdom: Animalia
- Phylum: Chordata
- Class: Mammalia
- Order: Perissodactyla
- Family: Rhinocerotidae
- Subfamily: †Aceratheriinae
- Genus: †Floridaceras; Wood, 1964
- Species: †F. whitei

Binomial name
- †Floridaceras whitei Wood, 1964

= Floridaceras =

Floridaceras Temporal range: Early Miocene

Extinct genus of rhinoceros

Floridaceras is an extinct genus of rhinocerotid of the Miocene epoch (early Hemingfordian), endemic to North America, living from around ~20.6–16.3 Ma, existing for approximately 4.3 million years.

== Taxonomy ==
Floridaceras was named by Wood (1964). Its type is Floridaceras whitei. It was assigned to Rhinocerotidae by Wood (1964) and Carroll (1988); and to Aceratheriinae by Prothero (1998).

== Fossil distribution ==
The only site known is the Thomas Farm Site in Gilchrist County, Florida, ~20.6–16.3 Ma.

== Description ==
Floridaceras was of unusually large size for a rhinoceros of the Hemingfordian. It would have been roughly comparable to a black rhinoceros in size, much larger than contemporaries such as the Menoceras. Like many primitive Aceratheriines, it has no horn, relatively long limbs and brachydont dentition (indicating it was a browser).
