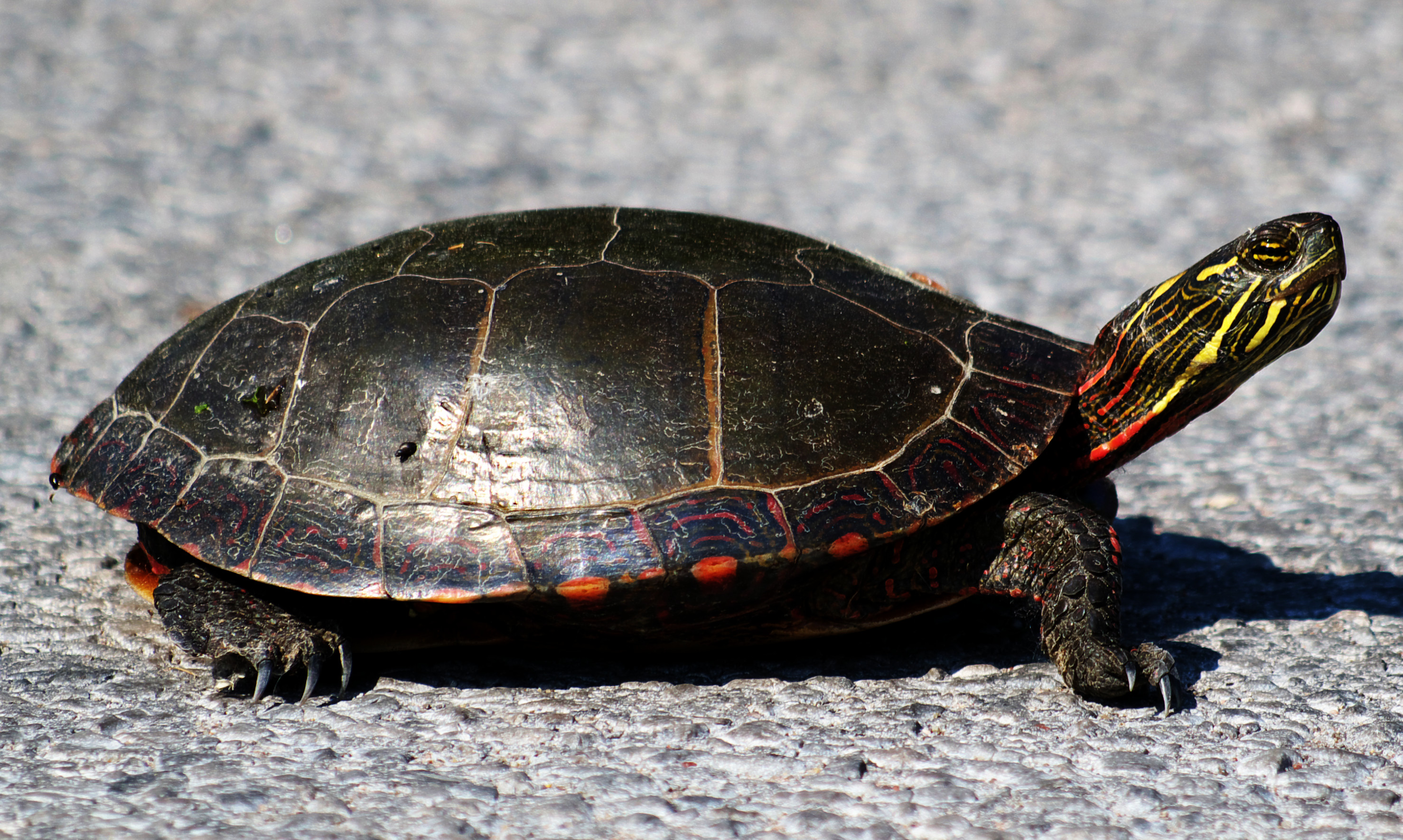
- Painted turtle (Chrysemys picta)

Scientific classification
- Kingdom: Animalia
- Phylum: Chordata
- Class: Reptilia
- Order: Testudines
- Suborder: Cryptodira
- Family: Emydidae
- Subfamily: Deirochelyinae
- Genus: Chrysemys; Gray, 1844

Species
- See text

= Chrysemys =

Chrysemys Temporal range: 15–0 Ma Neogene–recent

Genus of reptile

Chrysemys is a genus of turtles in the family Emydidae. They are found throughout most of North America. The species in the genus include the painted and the southern painted turtles.

== Reproduction ==
Chrysemys have temperature dependent sex determination. During egg incubation, lower temperatures produce males while higher temperatures produce females.

== Species ==
There are two extant species:

Image	Scientific name	Common name	Distribution
	Chrysemys dorsalis Agassiz, 1857	Southern painted turtle	south-central United States.
	Chrysemys picta Schneider, 1783)	Painted turtle	southern Canada to northern Mexico

== Fossil record ==
Several fossil species have been described, dating back to the Miocene.

Fossil species

- Chrysemys corniculata
- Chrysemys idahoensis (sometimes included in Trachemys or Pseudemys)
- Chrysemys isoni
- Chrisemys timidus (may belong to distinct genus)
- Chrisemys williamsi (may belong to distinct genus)
