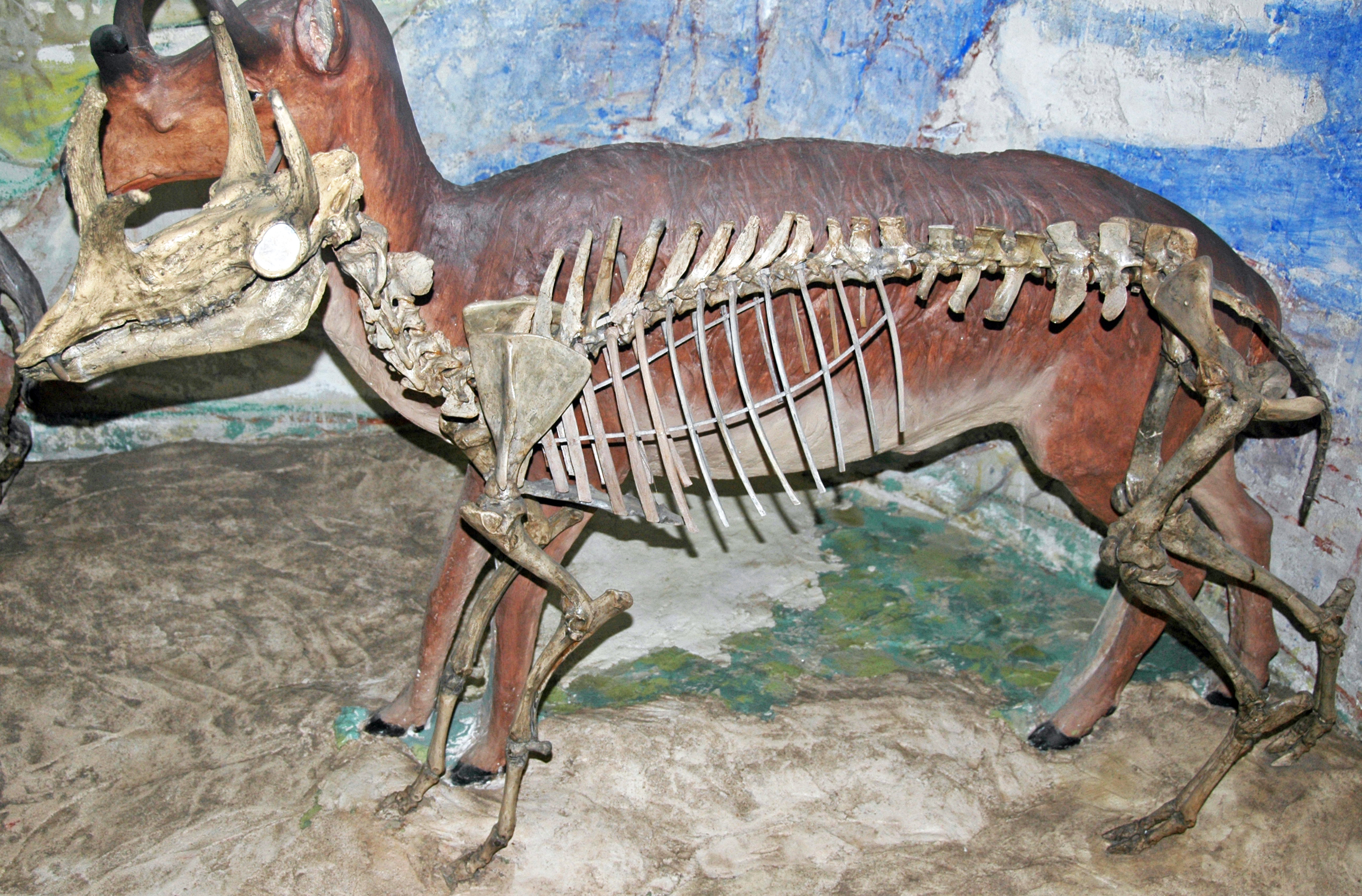
- Skeleton, Nebraska State Museum of Natural History

Scientific classification
- Domain: Eukaryota
- Kingdom: Animalia
- Phylum: Chordata
- Class: Mammalia
- Order: Artiodactyla
- Family: †Protoceratidae
- Subfamily: †Synthetoceratinae
- Tribe: †Kyptoceratini
- Genus: †Syndyoceras
- Species: †S. cooki

Binomial name
- †Syndyoceras cooki Barbour, 1905

= Syndyoceras =

Syndyoceras Temporal range: Miocene, 23.1–18.5 Ma

Extinct genus of mammals

Syndyoceras is a small extinct genus of Artiodactyla, of the family Protoceratidae, endemic to central North America from the Miocene epoch (23.1—18.5 Ma), existing for approximately 4.6 million years.

== Taxonomy ==
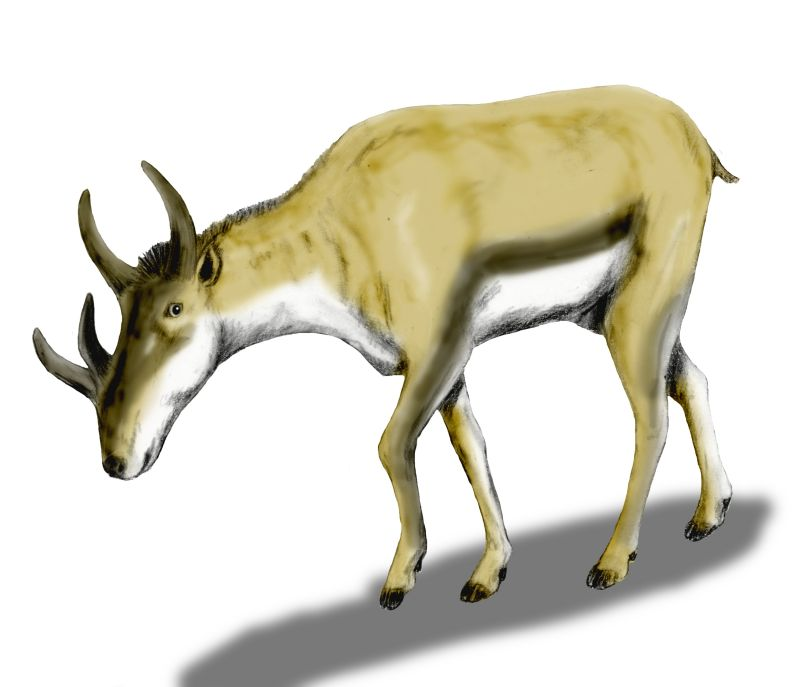
Restoration

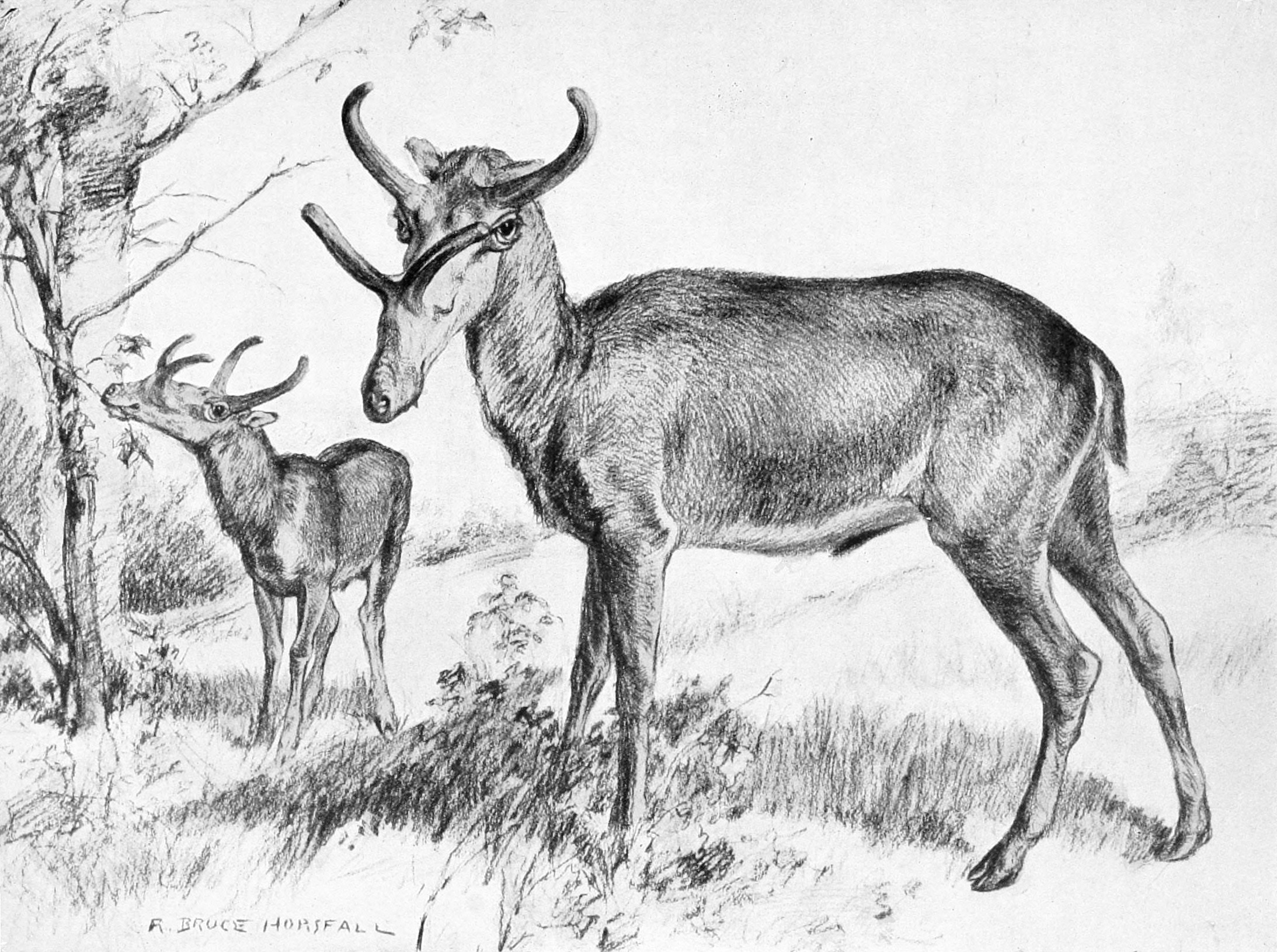
Restoration by Robert Bruce Horsfall

Syndyoceras was named by Barbour (1905). Its type is Syndyoceras cooki. It was assigned to Protoceratidae by Barbour (1905) and Carroll (1988); and to Kyptoceratini by Webb (1981), Prothero (1998), Webb et al. (2003) and Prothero and Ludtke (2007).

== Morphology ==
The skull decoration of Syndyoceras looked quite unlike those of a deer. It had two pairs of horns. The first was a V-shaped pair on the snout, fused at the base. The second pair was placed between the eyes and the ears and was curved inwards, the horns facing towards each other in a semicircular shape. Like giraffe ossicones, these protrusions were covered with skin. They were probably used for display and fighting.

In addition to the horns, Syndyoceras also possessed tusk-like canine teeth, that it may have used to root through soil and undergrowth for food, in a similar manner to a modern musk deer. The shape of the skull also suggests that it may have had an inflated muzzle, like that of a modern saiga.

The 5.2-foot-long (1.6 m), creature closely resembled a deer, having two hooved toes and reaching a weight over 60 kg. Like early horses, such as Merychippus, it had two vestigial outer toes on each foot, which did not touch the ground.
