= Primonatalus =

Primonatalus Temporal range: Early Miocene

Scientific classification
- Kingdom: Animalia
- Phylum: Chordata
- Class: Mammalia
- Order: Chiroptera
- Family: Natalidae
- Genus: †Primonatalus; Morgan and Czaplewski, 2003
- Species: †P. prattae

Binomial name
- †Primonatalus prattae Morgan and Czaplewski, 2003

Extinct species of bat

Primonatalus prattae is a fossil bat species from the family of the Natalidae which lived in the early Miocene in Florida. This animal, the only species of the genus Primonatalus, is known from 32 fossils (upper and lower jaws, isolated teeth and various other bones).
