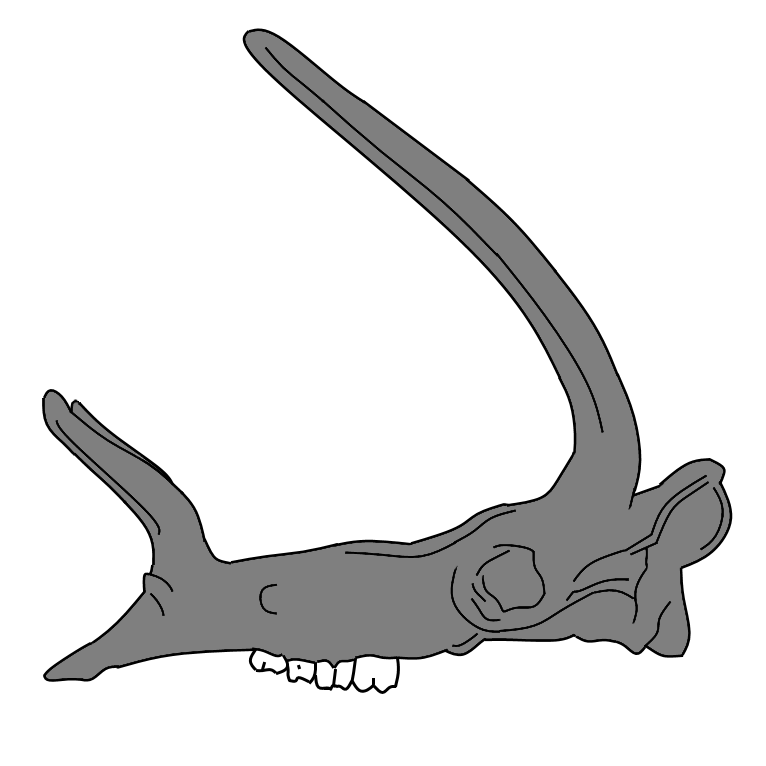
- Skull

Scientific classification
- Domain: Eukaryota
- Kingdom: Animalia
- Phylum: Chordata
- Class: Mammalia
- Order: Artiodactyla
- Family: †Protoceratidae
- Genus: †Kyptoceras
- Species: †K. amatorum

Binomial name
- †Kyptoceras amatorum Webb, 1981

= Kyptoceras =

Kyptoceras Temporal range: Miocene–Early Pliocene

Extinct species of mammal

Kyptoceras was a small extinct artiodactyl ungulate mammal of the family Protoceratidae, endemic to southeastern North America from the Miocene to Early Pliocene epoch 23.03—3.6 Ma, existing for approximately 19.43 million years. The species name, amatorum, comes in honor of all amateur fossil collectors, including Frank Garcia (Ruskin, Florida) the amateur who found it and donated it to the Florida Museum of Natural History.

== Taxonomy ==
Kyptoceras is the last known member of the family. The protoceratids were believed to have been driven to extinction by more advanced grazing herbivores, but in Florida, where there were still relatively large tracts of forest, the protoceratids were able to survive. The genus name comes from its bent horns, in which the two horns above the eyes curved over its head, and the two nasal horns pointed forward.

== Fossil distribution ==
Fossils have been recovered from:

- Tiger Bay Mine, Upper Bone Valley Formation, Polk County, Florida
- Lee Creek Mine, Yorktown Formation, Beaufort County, North Carolina
