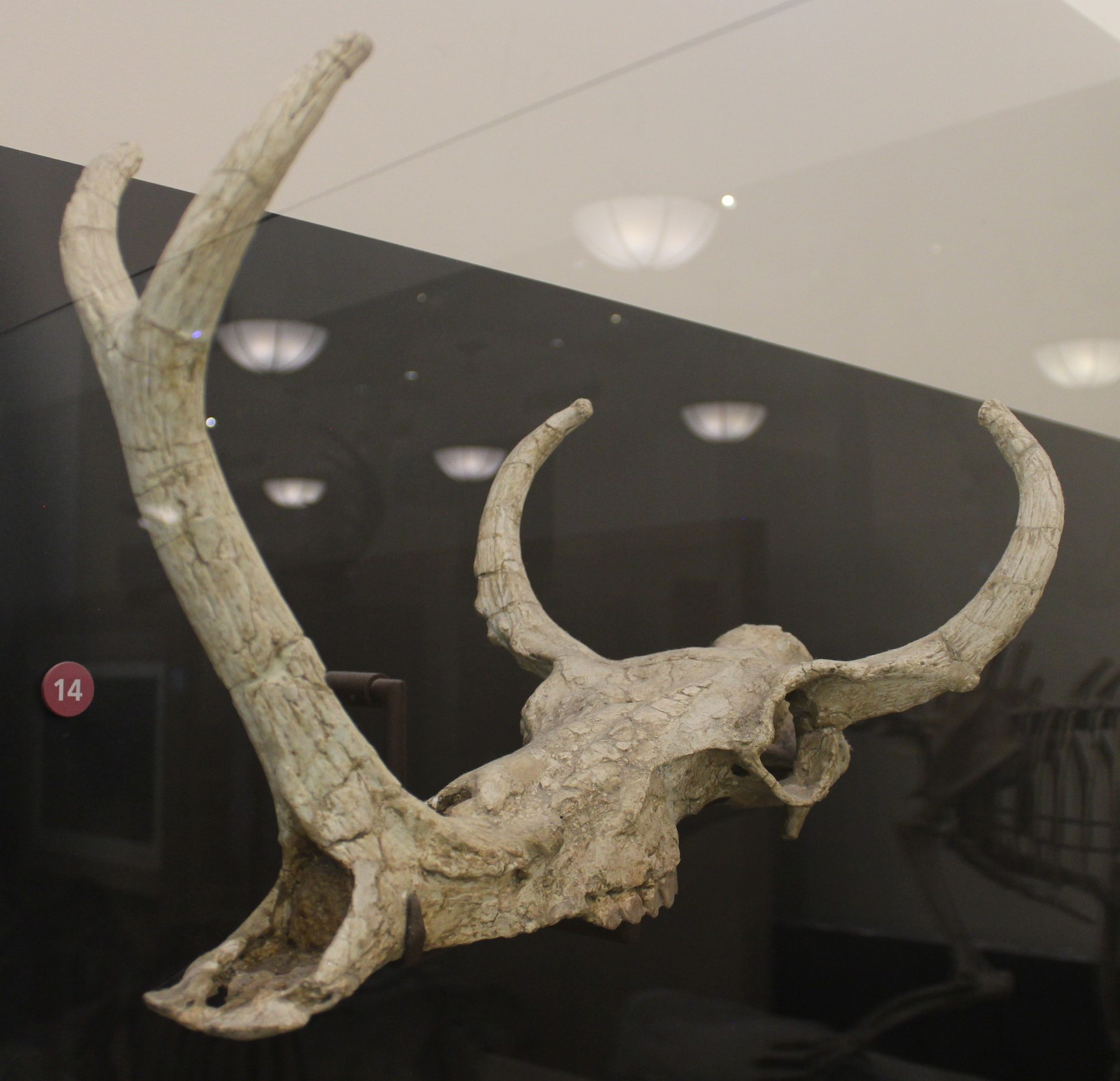
- Skull of S. tricornatus

Scientific classification
- Kingdom: Animalia
- Phylum: Chordata
- Class: Mammalia
- Infraclass: Placentalia
- Order: Artiodactyla
- Family: †Protoceratidae
- Genus: †Synthetoceras; Stirton, 1932

Type species
- †Synthetoceras tricornatus Stirton, 1932

Species
- †S. tricornatus Stirton, 1932; †S. davisorum Hulbert & Whitmore 2006

= Synthetoceras =

Synthetoceras Temporal range: Late Miocene (Hemphillian) 12.5–4.7 Ma

Extinct genus of even-toed ungulates

Synthetoceras is an extinct genus of large protoceratid that was endemic to North America during the Late Miocene (12.5-4.7 million years ago), existing for approximately 7.8 million years. Fossils have been recovered from Nebraska and Texas. Two species have been described: S. tricornatus (the type species) and S. davisorum.

== Description ==
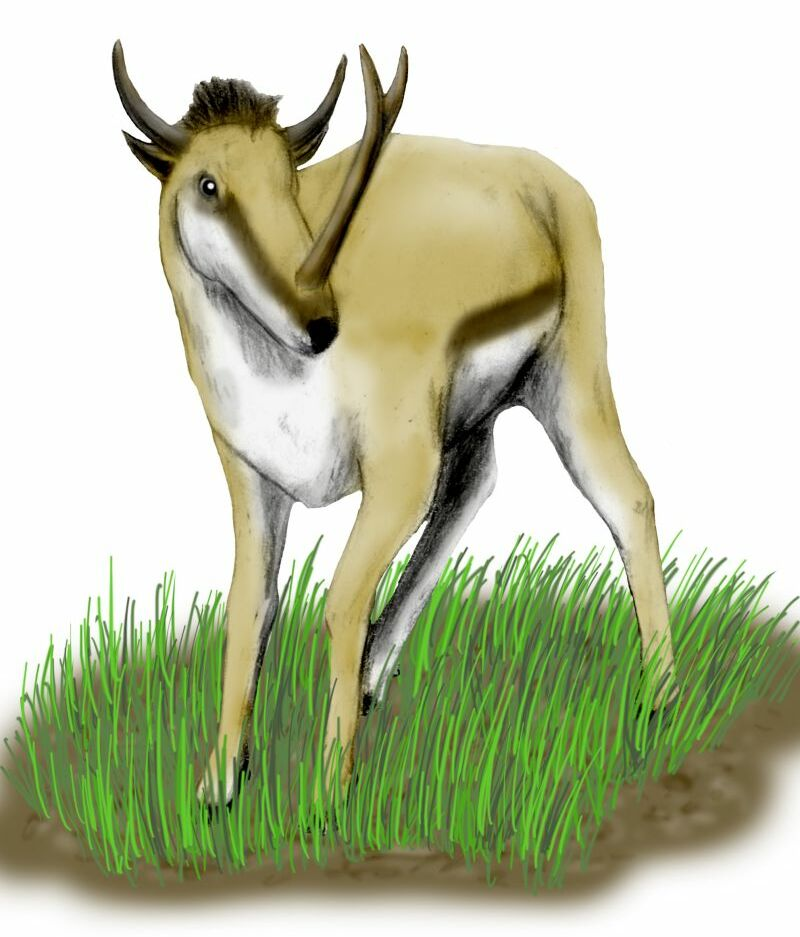
Life restoration of S. tricornatus

With a length of 2 m (6.6 ft) and a mass of 150–200 kg (330–440 lb), Synthetoceras was the largest member of its family. It was also the last, and had what is considered to be the protoceratids' strangest set of horns. The two horns above its eyes looked fairly normal and similar to those of many modern horned mammals, but on its snout it had a bizarre, long horn with a forked tip that gave it a Y-shape. Only males had this strange horn, and they probably used it in territorial fights.
