= Hemingfordian =

North American faunal stage

The Hemingfordian on the geologic timescale is the North American faunal stage according to the North American Land Mammal Ages chronology (NALMA), typically set from 20,600,000 to 16,300,000 years BP. It is usually considered to overlap the latest Aquitanian and Burdigalian of the Early Miocene. The Hemingfordian is preceded by the Arikareean and followed by the Barstovian NALMA stages.

The Hemingfordian can be further divided into the substages of:

- He2: Late/Upper Hemingfordian: Lower boundary source: base of Burdigalian (approximate).
- He1: Early/Lower Hemingfordian (shares lower boundary)
