= Magerictis =

Magerictis Temporal range: Middle Miocene

Scientific classification
- Kingdom: Animalia
- Phylum: Chordata
- Class: Mammalia
- Infraclass: Placentalia
- Order: Carnivora
- Family: Ailuridae
- Subfamily: Ailurinae
- Genus: †Magerictis; Ginsburg, Morales, Soria and Herraez, 1997

Type species
- †Magerictis imperialenis Ginsburg, Morales, Soria and Herraez, 1997

Extinct genus of ailurid

Magerictis is a fossil genus of ailurid with a single species Magerictis imperialenis (sometimes spelled Magerictis imperialis), which was originally known from a single m2 tooth. Several more specimens were later found, but were undescribed as of 2014.

== Taxonomy & evolution ==
Magerictis is placed in the subfamily Ailurinae, though its relationship to other genera and species in that subfamily are still unknown. It is considered to have likely evolved from a species of Amphictis.

A study published in 2025 describing cranial and postcranial fossils of M. imperialensis assigned the genus, along with the newly-named Rothictis, to the new subfamily Magerictinae.

== Description ==
Magerictics imperialenis is estimated to have been slightly smaller than the closely related Parailurus and similar in size to the extant relative Ailurus. It differs from both genera in that the m2 was "completely basined with all cuspids, including that of the trigonid, being located at the tooth margin, which implies that protoconid and metaconid are not connected" per Morlo & Peigne 2014. The sole described specimen was found at a site near Madrid of early Miocene age.
