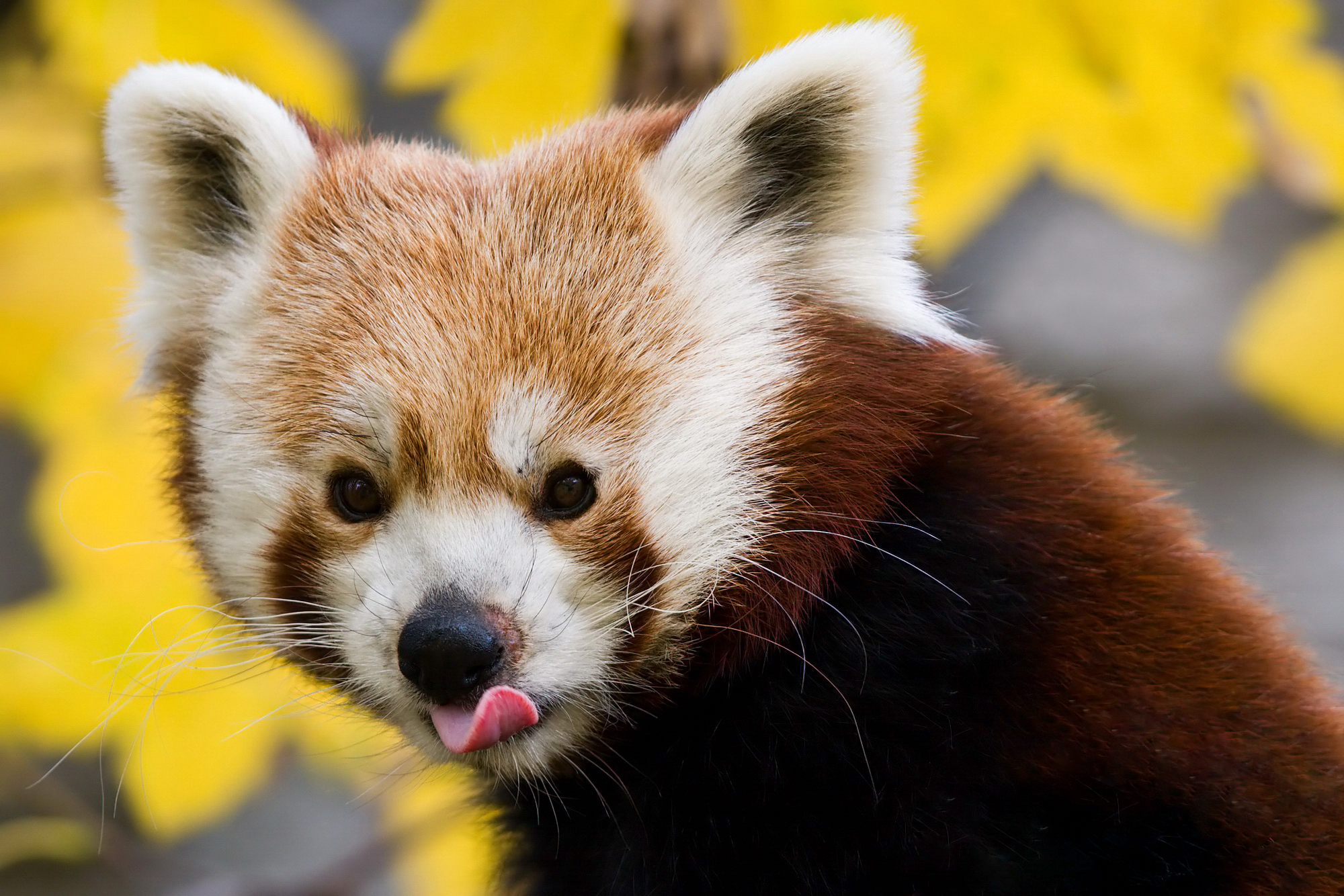
- Red panda (Ailurus fulgens)
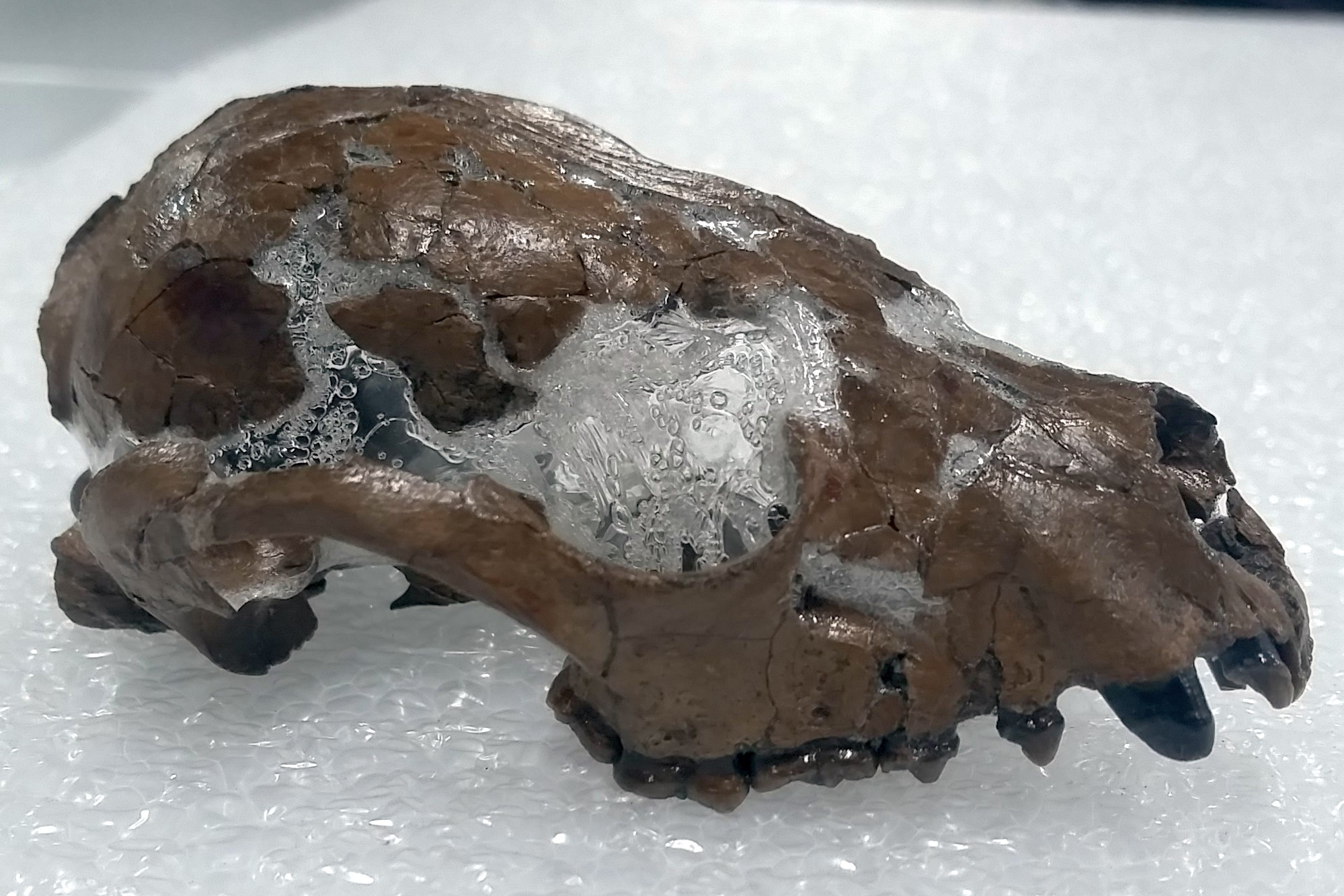
- Skull of Pristinailurus bristoli

Scientific classification
- Kingdom: Animalia
- Phylum: Chordata
- Class: Mammalia
- Order: Carnivora
- Family: Ailuridae
- Subfamily: Ailurinae; Gray, 1843

Genera
- †Magerictis Ginsburg et al., 1997; Ailurini J. E. Gray, 1843; Ailurus F. Cuvier, 1825; †Pristinailurini Wallace & Lyon, 2022; †Pristinailurus Wallace & Wang, 2004; †Parailurus Schlosser, 1899

= Ailurinae =

Ailurinae Temporal range: Middle Miocene–Recent

Subfamily of carnivores

Ailurinae is a subfamily of Ailuridae (of which this is the only extant subfamily out of three). While it is represented by the extant genus Ailurus, there were a handful of genera whose fossils have been found across the Holarctic region. These include the Middle Miocene Magerictis of Spain, the Early Pliocene Pristinailurus of the United States of America and their sister taxon Parailurus of Eurasia and North America in the Pliocene. Unlike Ailurus which is a specialized arboreal bamboo forager, the extinct ailurine species were more generalized and spent their time foraging on the ground.
