= Dafengding Nature Reserve =

Nature reserve in Sichuan, China

- 大风顶
- Location within China
- Location: Sichuan Province, China
- Coordinates: 28°40′59″N 103°15′36″E
- Area: 461 km^{2} (178 sq mi)
- Established: 1978

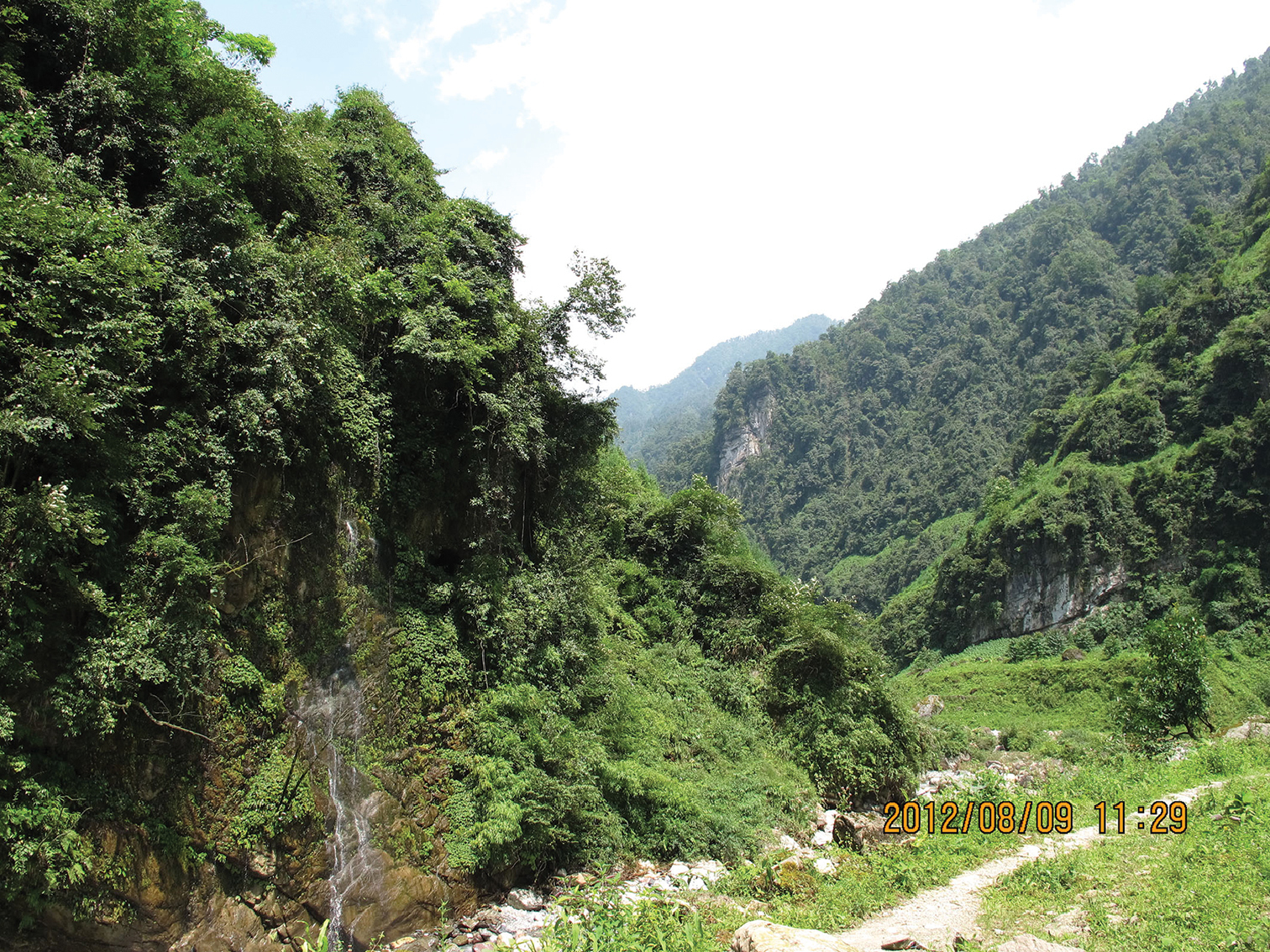
The Reserve in 2018

The Dafengding Nature Reserve (Chinese: 大风顶; pinyin: dàfēng dǐng) is located in Meigu County, Liangshan Yi Autonomous Prefecture, and in the Mabian Yi Autonomous County in Leshan prefecture-level city, both in Sichuan Province in the People's Republic of China, within the montane forests of the Hengduan Mountains.

- Elevation: 1240 – 3835 meters (Meigu reserve); 1200–4042 meters (Mabian reserve)
- Area: 159.50 sq. kilometers (Meigu reserve); 301.46 sq. kilometers (Mabian reserve)
- Established: 1978

The southernmost population of giant pandas live in this area. Besides the giant panda, fauna in the reserve include:

- red panda
- Asiatic black bear
- blue sheep
- giant salamander
- golden monkey
- goral
- leopard
- clouded leopard
- macaque
- muntjac
- sambar

In 2025, researchers described mustelid specimens captured in the Dafengding Nature Reserve as a new species, Mustela mopbie.
