= Meigu County =

Meigu County 美姑县 · ꂿꈬꑤ
- County
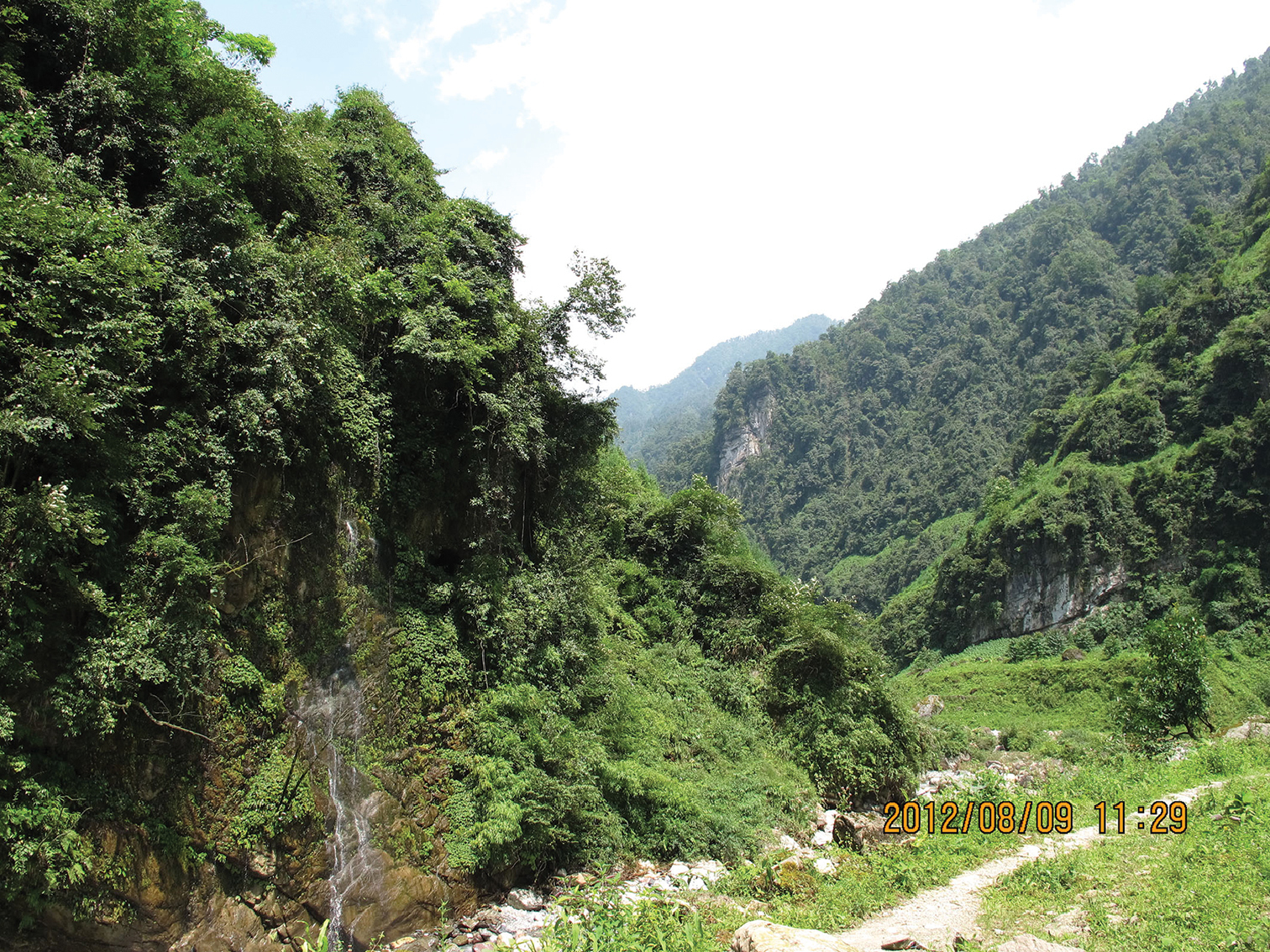
- Dafengding Nature Reserve

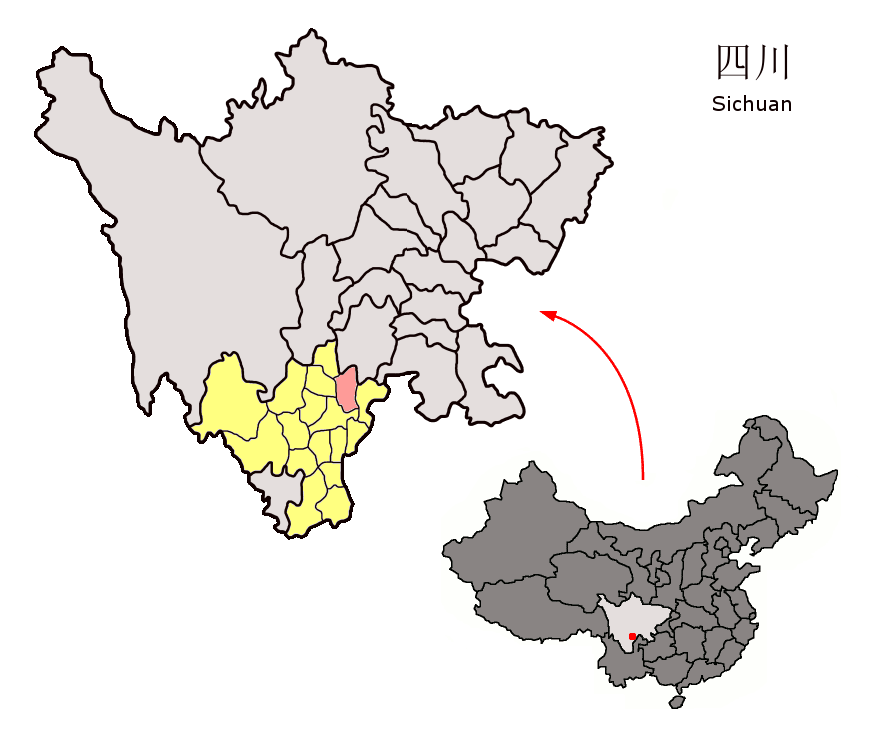
- Location of Meigu County (pink) and Liangshan Prefecture (yellow) within Sichuan

- Location of the seat in Sichuan Meigu (China)
- Coordinates: 28°19′44″N 103°07′55″E
- Country: China
- Province: Sichuan
- Autonomous prefecture: Liangshan
- County seat: Bapu Town

Area
  - Total: 2,573 km^{2} (993 sq mi)

Population (2020)
  - Total: 238,624
  - Density: 92.74/km^{2} (240.2/sq mi)
- Time zone: UTC+8 (China Standard)
- Website: www.meigu.gov.cn

Meigu County

Chinese name
- Simplified Chinese: 美姑县
- Traditional Chinese: 美姑縣
Transcriptions
Standard Mandarin
- Hanyu Pinyin: Měigū Xiàn

Yi name
- Yi: ꂿꈬꑤ; Romanisation: mo ggu xiep

Meigu County (Chinese: 美姑县; Yi: ꂿꈬꑤ) is a part of the Liangshan Yi Autonomous Prefecture in the south of Sichuan province. Located in the northeast of Liangshan Prefecture, it has a major concentration of the Nuosu or Yi people. The county is largely mountainous. It is a poor area and much of the land has been deforested in the past 50 years.

Many bimo practitioner live in this county, and it is home to the Cultural Centre for Bimo Studies.

== Administrative divisions ==
Meigu County comprises 7 towns and 11 townships.

Name	Simplified Chinese	Hanyu Pinyin	Yi	Romanized Yi	Administrative division code
Towns
Bapu Town	巴普镇	Bāpǔ Zhèn	ꀠꁌꍔ	ba pu zhep	513436100
Hongxi Town	洪溪镇	Hóngxī Zhèn	ꉘꐯꍔ	hxo jjy zhep	513436101
Xinqiao Town	新桥镇	Xīnqiáo Zhèn	ꑝꐇꍔ	xit quop zhep	513436102
Niuniuba Town	牛牛坝镇	Niúniúbà Zhèn	ꑖꑗꀞꍔ	nyox nyo bat zhep	513436103
Lama Town	拉马镇	Lāmǎ Zhèn	ꆿꂷꍔ	lat ma zhep	513436104
Houbonaituo Town	候播乃拖镇	Hòubōnǎituō Zhèn	ꉘꁨꆻꄧꍔ	hxo bbop liet tuo zhep	513436105
Hougumo Town	候古莫镇	Hòugǔmó Zhèn	ꉻꈫꃀꍔ	ho ggux mop zhep	513436106
Townships
Jueluo Township	觉洛乡	Juéluó Xiāng	ꐥꇉꑣ	jjo lo xie	513436100
Jingyetexi Township	井叶特西乡	Jǐngyètèxī Xiāng	ꐱꑴꄮꑭꑣ	njit yip te xy xie	513436101
Heguluo Township	合姑洛乡	Hégūluò Xiāng	ꉷꈠꇉꑣ	huo gguo lo xie	513436102
Dianbu Township	典补乡	Diǎnbǔ Xiāng	ꄄꀱꑣ	diex bur xie	513436108
Jiukou Township	九口乡	Jiǔkǒu Xiāng	ꏬꈌꑣ	jot ke xie	513436217
Luo'eyigan Township	洛俄依甘乡	Luó'éyīgān Xiāng	ꆦꀑꒈꇤꑣ	hlo o yyx ga xie	513436218
Liuhong Township	柳洪乡	Liǔhóng Xiāng	ꑙꉘꑣ	nyut hxo xie	513436221
Equgu Township	峨曲古乡	Éqǔgǔ Xiāng	ꀑꐎꈪꑣ	o qu ggut xie	513436225
Longmen Township	龙门乡	Lóngmén Xiāng	ꇉꂾꑣ	lo mox xie	513436229
Saku Township	洒库乡	Sǎkù Xiāng	ꌐꈐꑣ	sat ku xie	513436231
Wahou Township	瓦候乡	Wǎhòu Xiāng			513436235

== Points of interest ==
- Dafengding Nature Reserve (panda and bird habitat)

== Climate ==
Climate data for Meigu, elevation 1,944 m (6,378 ft), (1991–2020 normals, extremes 1981–2010)
Month	Jan	Feb	Mar	Apr	May	Jun	Jul	Aug	Sep	Oct	Nov	Dec	Year
Record high °C (°F)	25.2 (77.4)	26.7 (80.1)	33.4 (92.1)	33.5 (92.3)	34.1 (93.4)	33.0 (91.4)	34.1 (93.4)	35.2 (95.4)	35.7 (96.3)	30.6 (87.1)	26.6 (79.9)	23.5 (74.3)	35.7 (96.3)
Mean daily maximum °C (°F)	10.9 (51.6)	15.5 (59.9)	19.9 (67.8)	23.1 (73.6)	24.6 (76.3)	24.8 (76.6)	27.1 (80.8)	26.8 (80.2)	23.5 (74.3)	18.9 (66.0)	16.3 (61.3)	11.3 (52.3)	20.2 (68.4)
Daily mean °C (°F)	3.5 (38.3)	6.8 (44.2)	10.6 (51.1)	14.3 (57.7)	16.8 (62.2)	18.5 (65.3)	20.3 (68.5)	19.9 (67.8)	17.3 (63.1)	13.2 (55.8)	9.3 (48.7)	4.7 (40.5)	12.9 (55.3)
Mean daily minimum °C (°F)	−0.3 (31.5)	1.8 (35.2)	5.1 (41.2)	9.0 (48.2)	12.1 (53.8)	14.8 (58.6)	16.3 (61.3)	15.9 (60.6)	13.8 (56.8)	10.2 (50.4)	5.7 (42.3)	1.3 (34.3)	8.8 (47.9)
Record low °C (°F)	−7.0 (19.4)	−8.2 (17.2)	−2.3 (27.9)	−0.4 (31.3)	4.7 (40.5)	9.3 (48.7)	9.8 (49.6)	8.5 (47.3)	5.4 (41.7)	3.1 (37.6)	−3.4 (25.9)	−5.4 (22.3)	−8.2 (17.2)
Average precipitation mm (inches)	9.0 (0.35)	5.7 (0.22)	25.7 (1.01)	55.5 (2.19)	96.3 (3.79)	171.8 (6.76)	161.4 (6.35)	121.6 (4.79)	103.8 (4.09)	59.0 (2.32)	15.9 (0.63)	3.9 (0.15)	829.6 (32.65)
Average precipitation days (≥ 0.1 mm)	4.4	3.7	8.4	13.0	15.6	20.4	17.7	16.3	16.4	16.0	6.9	3.8	142.6
Average snowy days	6.6	4.0	2.5	0.3	0	0	0	0	0	0	1.0	4.2	18.6
Average relative humidity (%)	69	60	59	63	69	79	79	79	81	82	75	72	72
Mean monthly sunshine hours	144.1	171.6	205.3	196.8	178.2	121.6	158.2	160.7	117.3	106.3	138.9	126.7	1,825.7
Percentage possible sunshine	44	54	55	51	42	29	37	40	32	30	44	40	42
Source: China Meteorological Administration
