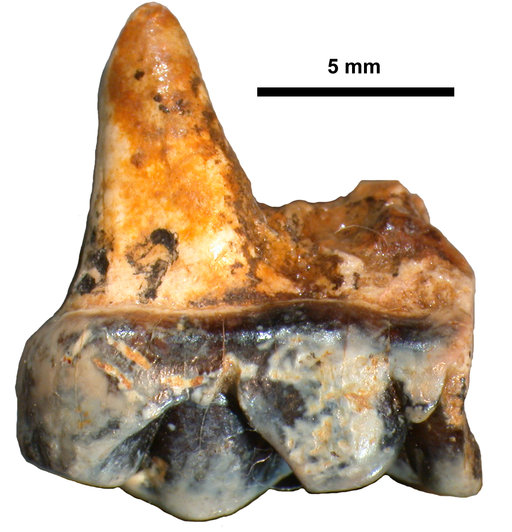
- Left upper first molar fragment (UCMP 77039) referred to P. cf. P. anglicus

Scientific classification
- Kingdom: Animalia
- Phylum: Chordata
- Class: Mammalia
- Order: Carnivora
- Family: Ailuridae
- Subfamily: Ailurinae
- Genus: †Parailurus; Schlosser, 1899

Type species
- †Ailurus anglicus Dawkins, 1888

Species
- †P. anglicus (Dawkins, 1888); †P. baikalicus Sotnikova, 2008; †P. tedfordi Wallace & Lyon, 2022

= Parailurus =

Parailurus Temporal range: Early Pliocene–Late Pliocene

Extinct genus of carnivores

Parailurus is a genus of extinct carnivoran mammal in the family Ailuridae. It was about 50% larger than Ailurus (red panda) and lived in the Early to Late Pliocene, and its fossils have been found in Europe, Asia and North America.

== History of discovery ==
The type species, Parailurus anglicus, was first described by William Boyd Dawkins in 1888, who originally called it Ailurus anglicus. The species was found at the Red Crag in East Anglia. Max Schlosser reclassified the species' genus as Parailurus in 1899, following a study of a more complete specimen's dentition from the Baróth-Köpecz locality.

Tivadar Kormos described a new species of Parailurus called Parailurus hungaricus in 1939, known from the site of Hajnáčka in Slovakia, dating back to the early MN 16 stage. This species is now considered a junior synonym of Parailurus anglicus. The other two species, P. baikalicus and P. tedfordi, were described in 2008 and 2022 respectively. Specimens identified from Japan are referred to P. sp.

== Description ==
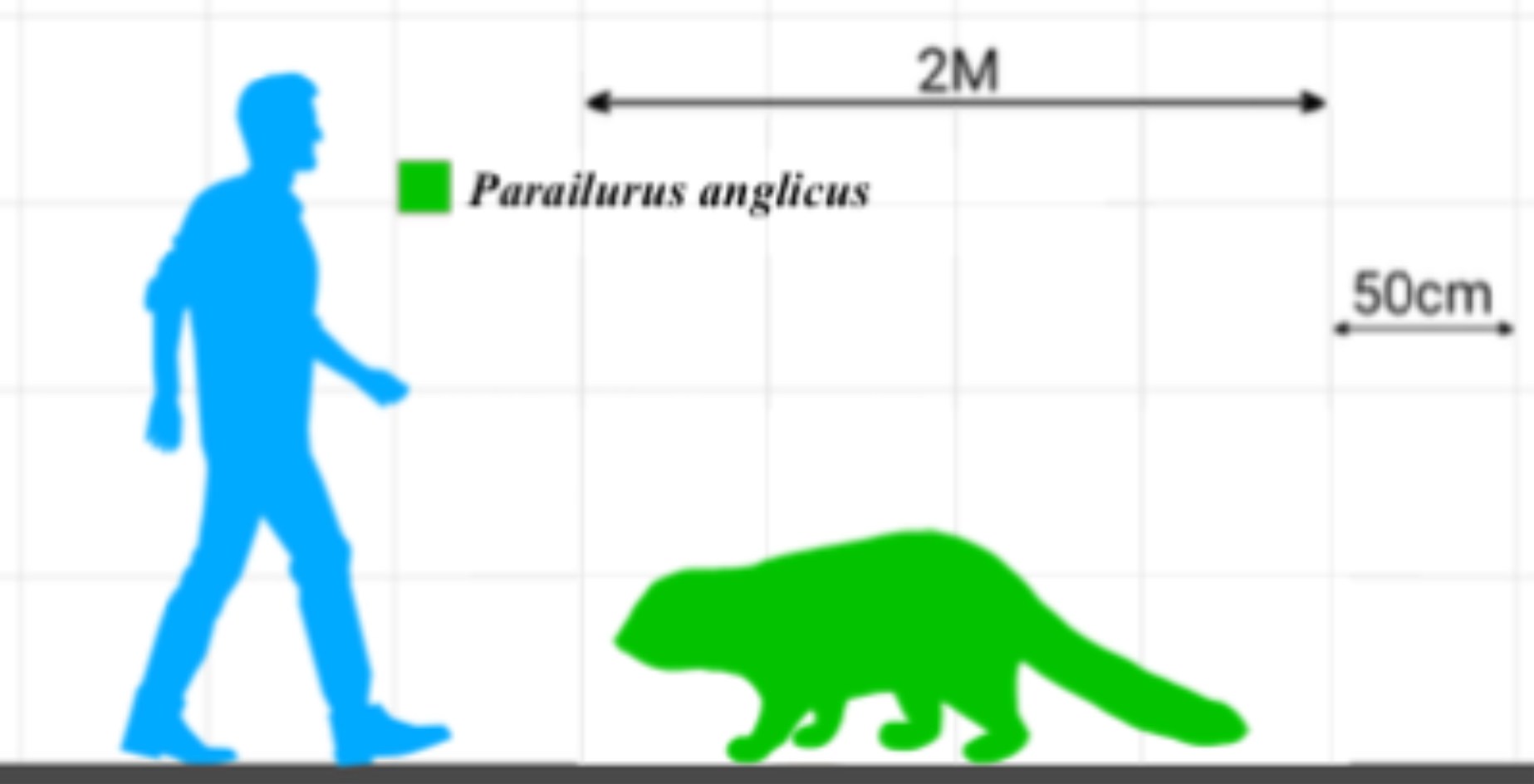
Size compared to human

Because Parailurus anglicus has been only described by fragmentary remains, its appearance hasn't been well-documented. Other Ailurids provide the general idea of what Parailurus anglicus looked like. Dawkins' specimen was a "battered and worn down" part of the right lower jaw, not giving much information of the appearance of Parailurus anglicus.

A reconstruction by the Czech artist Oldřich Kroupa represented it as extremely similar to the red panda, though with darker and dull fur. Parailurus anglicus was twice the size of a red panda, and probably lived in a similar environment to that of the red panda.

Parailurus anglicus had a much rather distinct dentition when compared to other ailurids. It has a pretty unusual upper fourth premolar, with greater antoposterior length than transverse width. Its teeth suggest it was an omnivorous animal. The fossils of P. baikalicus, known from the Transbaikal region of Russia, carry low-crowned lower molars, along with the main cuspids of the cheek teeth being worn horizontally. This suggests P. baikalicus was folivorous, commonly consuming leaves.

== Classification ==
The placement of Parailurus anglicus and ailurids overall in the evolutionary tree has been debated. They were first placed in the family Procyonidae in the early 20th century for the raccoon's similarity with the red panda. Newer genetic studies in 2005, 2018 and 2021 have placed the ailurid family in the clade Musteloidea, which includes Procyonidae, Mustelidae (weasels, minks and relatives) and Mephitidae (skunks and stink badgers).
