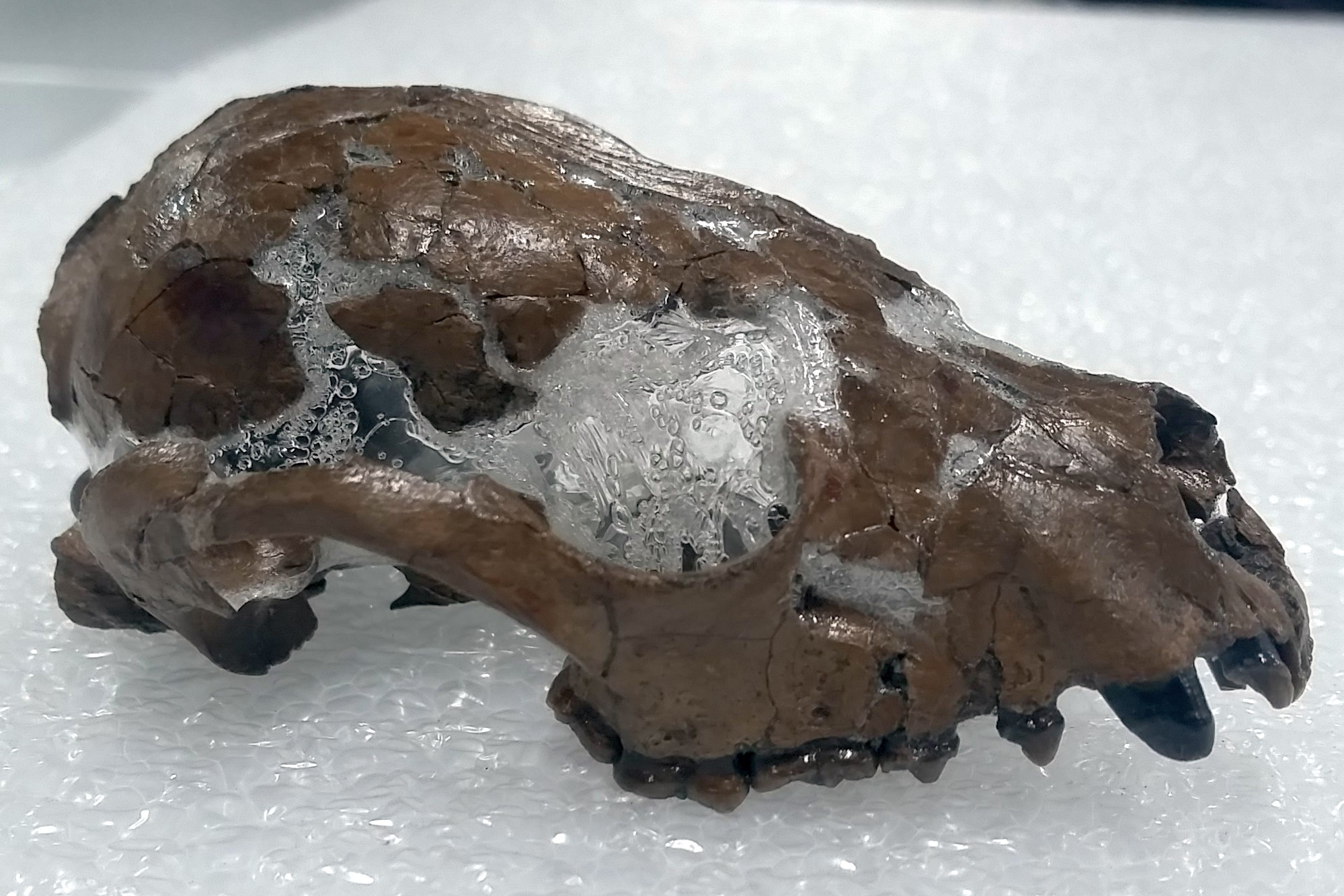
- Skull of P. bristoli
- Reconstructed head of P. bristoli

Scientific classification
- Kingdom: Animalia
- Phylum: Chordata
- Class: Mammalia
- Order: Carnivora
- Family: Ailuridae
- Genus: †Pristinailurus; Wallace & Wang, 2004
- Species: †P. bristoli

Binomial name
- †Pristinailurus bristoli Wallace & Wang, 2004

= Pristinailurus =

Pristinailurus Temporal range: Miocene–Pliocene

Extinct genus of carnivore

Pristinailurus bristoli is a fossil species in the carnivoran family Ailuridae. It is well-represented in the Hemphillian-aged deposits at the Gray Fossil Site in Gray, Tennessee. It was significantly larger than the living Ailurus, but probably possessed a comparatively weaker bite. P. bristoli was sexually dimorphic, as males appeared to have been up to twice the size of females.

== Anatomy ==
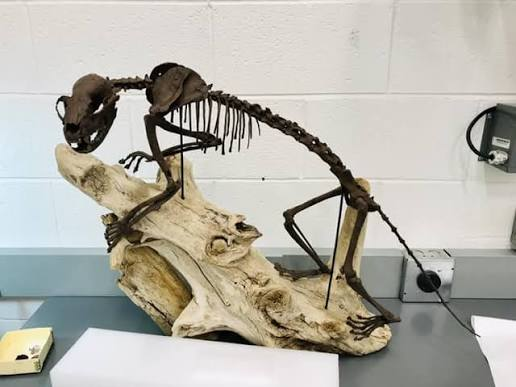
Bristol's panda skeleton

P. bristoli was likely adapted to terrestrial and some arboreal locomotion, with a generalist diet.
