= Alkali Canyon Formation =

Geologic formation

- Stratigraphic range: Tortonian-Zanclean (Hemphillian); ~10.3–4.9 Ma
- Type: Formation
- Unit of: Dalles Group
- Overlies: Columbia River Basalt Group

Lithology
- Primary: Sandstone
- Other: Tuff

Location
- Coordinates: 45.7°N 120.2°W
- Approximate paleocoordinates: 45.6°N 117.5°W
- Region: Gilliam & Morrow Counties, Oregon
- Country: United States
- Extent: Eastern Columbia Basin

Type section
- Named for: Alkali Canyon, 16 km (9.9 mi) SW of Arlington
- Named by: Farooqui et al.
- Year defined: 1981
- Alkali Canyon Formation (the United States) Alkali Canyon Formation (Oregon)

The Alkali Canyon Formation is a geologic formation in Oregon. It preserves fossils dating back to the Tortonian to Zanclean stages (Hemphillian) of the Neogene period. It is confined to the Arlington basin, and is named after Alkali Canyon, a canyon 16 km southwest of Arlington, Oregon. It was formally defined in 1981 along with the Chenoweth, Tygh Valley, Deschutes, and McKay formations, many of which have historically been called the Dalles Formation. The Arlington basin is filled mainly with epiclastic sediment, derived from fragments of volcanic rock, from the northern flank of the Blue Mountains. The Alkali Canyon Formation is composed of basalt gravel and tuffaceous sediment. The Alkali Canyon Formation overlies the Columbia River Basalt Group, a layer of flood basalt from the middle to late Miocene. It underlies mainly Quaternary loess.

The Arlington basin the formation is located in is bordered by the Columbia Hills anticline on the north, the Service anticline on the east, the Blue Mountains on the south, and by basalt upland to the west.

== See also ==
- List of fossiliferous stratigraphic units in Oregon
- Paleontology in Oregon
