= Chalk Butte Formation =

Geologic formation in Oregon, US

- Stratigraphic range: Tortonian-Zanclean (Hemphillian); ~10.3–4.9 Ma
- Type: Formation
- Thickness: About 538 feet

Lithology
- Primary: Tuffaceous sandstones, siltstones, conglomerates
- Other: Tuff, ash beds, freshwater limestone

Location
- Coordinates: 43.6°N 117.5°W
- Approximate paleocoordinates: 44.3°N 114.6°W
- Region: Malheur County, Oregon
- Country: United States

Type section
- Named for: Chalk Butte
- Chalk Butte Formation (the United States) Chalk Butte Formation (Oregon)

The Chalk Butte Formation is a geologic formation in Oregon, which forms a part of the Idaho Group. It preserves fossils dating back to the Neogene period. It was proposed along with the Grassy Mountain Basalt Formation and the Kern Basin Formation as a division of the Idaho Group rocks in the Mitchell Butte Quadrangle. The predominant rock types are tuffaceous sandstones, siltstones, and conglomerates with smaller amounts of tuff, ash beds, and freshwater limestone. A partial section at the type location determined the formation to be about 538 feet thick.

== Fossil content ==
The following fossils have been reported from the formation:

- Antecalomys valensis
- Basirepomys pliocenicus
- Copemys cf. esmeraldensis
- Cupidinimus magnus
- Diprionomys parvus
- Dipoides vallicula
- Eucyon davisi
- Goniodontomys disjunctus
- Hypolagus vetus
- Peromyscus antiquus
- Pliohippus spectans
- Plionictis oregonensis
- Scapanus proceridens
- Dipoides sp.
- Spermophilus sp.
- Camelidae indet.
- Perognathinae indet.
- Soricidae indet.
- ?Vespertilionidae indet.

== See also ==
- List of fossiliferous stratigraphic units in Oregon
- Paleontology in Oregon
