= List of fossiliferous stratigraphic units in Oregon =

This article contains a list of fossil-bearing stratigraphic units in the state of Oregon, U.S.

== Lists of fossiliferous stratigraphic units ==
=== Cenozoic ===
Major Paleogene and Neogene fossiliferous stratigraphic units in Oregon
Pleistocene
Pliocene
Late Miocene
Early Miocene
Oligocene
Eocene
Paleocene

Group	Formation	Period	Notes
	Elk River Formation	Pleistocene Irvingtonian	
	Port Orford Formation	Middle Pleistocene	
	Merced Formation	Plio-Pleistocene	
	Empire Formation	Tortonian-Zanclean	
	Alkali Canyon Formation	Hemphillian	
	Chalk Butte Formation	Hemphillian	
	Drewsey Formation	Hemphillian	
	McKay Formation	Hemphillian	
	Juntura Formation	Clarendonian	
	The Dalles Formation	Clarendonian	
	Butte Creek Formation	Barstovian	
	Deer Butte Formation	Barstovian	
	Sucker Creek Formation	Barstovian	
	Mascall Formation	Hemingfordian-Barstovian	
	John Day Formation; John Day Fossil Beds National Monument	Late Eocene-Early Miocene (Duchesnean-Hemingfordian)	
	Nye Formation	Chattian-Burdigalian (Arikareean-Hemingfordian)	
Astoria	Astoria Shale	Oligocene	
	Scotts Mills Formation	Chattian	
	Yaquina Formation	Chattian	
	Alsea Formation	Rupelian (Whitneyan)	
	Fisher Formation	Rupelian	
	Mehama Formation	Early Oligocene	
	Pittsburg Bluff Formation	Priabonian-Chattian	
	Keasey Formation	Priabonian-Rupelian	
	Eugene Formation	Priabonian	
	Nestucca Formation	Bartonian-Priabonian	
	Spencer Formation	Bartonian	
	Coaledo Formation	Bartonian	
	Cowlitz Formation	Bartonian	
	Clarno Formation; John Day Fossil Beds National Monument	Bridgerian-Duchesnean	
	Tyee Formation	Ypresian-Lutetian	
Umpqua	Camas Valley Formation	Ypresian	
Umpqua	Flournoy Formation	Lutetian	
Umpqua	Lookingglass Formation	Ypresian	
Umpqua	Roseburg Formation	Ypresian	
Umpqua	White Tail Ridge Formation	Ypresian	
Umpqua	Tenmile Formation	Ypresian	
Umpqua	Bushnell Rock Formation	Ypresian	
	Yamhill Formation	Ypresian-Priabonian	
	Siletz River Volcanics	Selandian-Ypresian	

=== Mesozoic ===
Major Mesozoic and Permian fossiliferous stratigraphic units in Oregon
Cape Sebastian Sandstone
Chico Formation
Hudspeth Formation
Otter Point Formation
Nicely & Snowshoe Formations
Martin Bridge Limestone
Coyote Butte Limestone

Group	Formation	Period	Notes
	Cape Sebastian Sandstone	Campanian	
	Chico Formation	Santonian-Campanian	
	Hudspeth Formation	Albian	
	Days Creek Formation	Valanginian-Barremian	
Myrtle	Myrtle Formation	Valanginian-Hauterivian	
Myrtle	Dothan Formation	Berriasian-Valanginian	
	Otter Point Formation	Tithonian-Berriasian	
	Coon Hollow Formation	Oxfordian	
	Lonesome Formation	mid Callovian	
	Weberg Formation	Bajocian	
	Snowshoe Formation	Toarcian-Bathonian	
Mowich	Hyde Formation	early Toarcian	
Mowich	Nicely Formation	late Pliensbachian	
Mowich	Robertson Formation	late Pliensbachian	
Mowich	Suplee Formation	late Pliensbachian	
	Graylock Formation	Hettangian	
	Hurwal Formation	Norian	
	Martin Bridge Limestone	Carnian-Norian	
	Vester Formation	Carnian-Norian	
	Rail Cabin Argillite	Norian	
	Brisbois Member	Carnian	
Aldrich Mountains	Fields Creek Formation	Ladinian-Norian	

=== Paleozoic ===
Group	Formation	Period	Notes
	Coyote Butte Limestone	Sakmarian-Kungurian	

== See also ==
- Paleontology in Oregon
- Lists of Oregon-related topics
