= Coyote Butte Limestone =

Geologic formation in Oregon, US

- Stratigraphic range: Sakmarian (Wolfcampian)-Kungurian; ~296–273 Ma
- Type: Formation

Lithology
- Primary: Limestone
- Other: Sandstone

Location
- Coordinates: 43.96°N 119.74°W
- Approximate paleocoordinates: 17.9°N 38.8°W
- Region: Crook County, Oregon
- Country: United States
- Extent: Isolated buttes (Coyote & Tuckers) south and north (Triangulation Hill) of Grindstone & Twelvemile Creeks, Crook County, Oregon

Type section
- Named for: Coyote Butte
- Named by: Merriam & Berthiaume
- Year defined: 1943
- Coyote Butte Limestone (the United States) Coyote Butte Limestone (Oregon)

The Coyote Butte Limestone (OR085) is a geologic formation in Oregon. It preserves fossils dating back to the Sakmarian to Kungurian stages of the Permian period, spanning an estimated 23 million years. The formation occurs in isolated buttes to the north; Triangulation Hill, and south; type locality and name giver Coyote Butte and Tuckers Butte, on either side of the Grindstone and Twelvemile Creeks in Crook County, Oregon.

== Description ==
The Coyote Butte Formation was first defined by Merriam and Berthiaume in 1943. The formation crops out in isolated buttes (Coyote & Tuckers) south and north (Triangulation Hill) of the Grindstone and Twelvemile Creeks in Crook County, central Oregon. The formation comprises an uncommonly unaltered and well-exposed set of Permian shallow marine and reefal limestones in the tectonically complex Permian present-day Pacific margin of western North America.

The Coyote Butte Formation is represented by isolated limestone hills (0.1 to 2.0 square kilometres (0.039 to 0.772 sq mi) in area), of which most appear to have the same stratigraphic and biostratigraphic sequence and appear to be right-side-up. The resistant limestone blocks stand above the surrounding rocks of the "melange." The Coyote Butte Formation represents shallow-water carbonate-platform deposition and contains a varied faunal assemblage of corals, bryozoans, algae, fusulinids, brachiopods, crinoids, and conodonts.

"The Permian Coyote Butte Formation is dated by conodonts, fusulinids, and brachiopods as Aktastinian, Leonardian, and Roadian (stages of Furnish, 1973). The formation shows remarkable similarity in age, fauna, and sedimentation to the limestones near Quinn River Crossing, Nevada. The Paleozoic limestone blocks rest among oceanic-derived blocks that are probably early Mesozoic in age. To imply that the limestone belonged to the same tectonic-sedimentary package as the oceanic sediments (Dickinson and Thayer, 1978) seems precluded. The limestones contain volcaniclastic sand (Dickinson and Thayer, 1978, p. 152), indicating probable local presence of volcanics during deposition. Because the outcrops of the Coyote Butte Formation appear to all be stratigraphically right-side-up, the "melange" is not as chaotic as proposed by Dickinson and Thayer (1978); it has some order.

Also, it would be hard to imagine the Coyote Butte Formation as deposited as local limestone in a volcanic island chain and then admixed to the deformed oceanic sediments while maintaining its stratigraphic integrity.

It is easier to imagine the Coyote Butte Formation as being introduced as a late-stage structural event to deforming oceanic sediments in Mesozoic time. This implies that the other Paleozoic rocks would be similar late-stage introductions to the "melange." Whether the Coyote Butte Formation represents the remnants of a large olistostrome (gravity slide block) or thrust block or blocks that maintained stratigraphic integrity is difficult to resolve, given the poor exposures in the Coyote Butte area.

Because the Coyote Butte Formation is so similar to rocks found near Quinn River Crossing, it is suggestive that the rocks belong to a larger mass of shelfal limestones, parts of which are now found at several scattered localities."

=== Paleogeographic situation ===
The formation is dated to the Sakmarian to Kungurian stages of the Early to Middle Permian period, spanning an estimated 23 million years from 296 to 273 Ma. During these times, what is now central Oregon, was located at the edge of Pangea in the northern paleotemperate zone, at paleolatitudes of 16-18° North.

=== Tectonics ===
The hinterland of the carbonate platform where the Coyote Butte Limestone was deposited, was formed by the Arizonan and Utahan arid landscapes of a Pangea starting to break up. This occurred before the Sonoma orogeny was active in western North America and during the Alleghanian orogeny in eastern Laurentia and western Europe.

The 23 million year deposition coincided with impact of the Clearwater West crater, dated at 286.2 ± 2.6 million years ago.

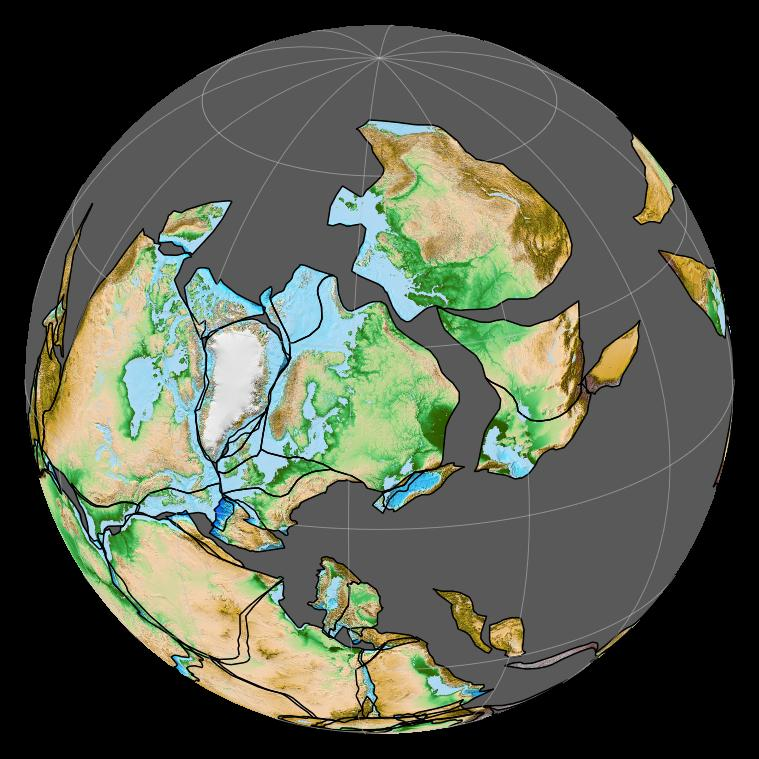
Paleogeography of the Early Permian, 280 Ma

Location of the Alleghanian mountain chains in the Carboniferous period, just before the Permian

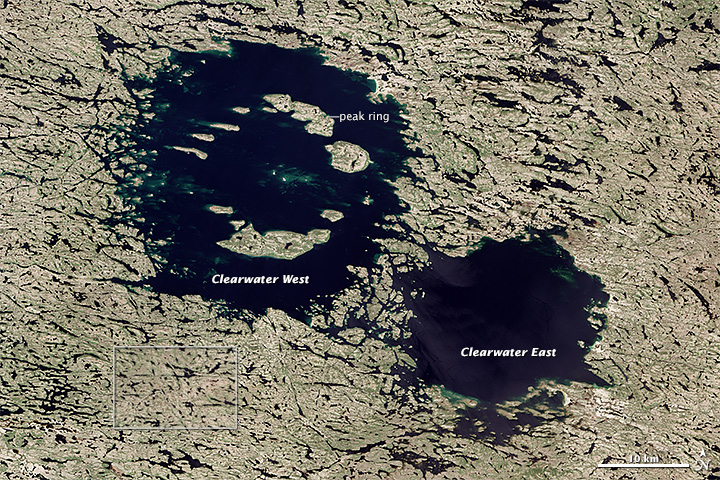
Clearwater Lakes in Quebec, the larger West crater dated to 286.2 ± 2.6 Ma

== Paleontological significance ==
The formation is the only discovered Paleozoic fossiliferous formation in the state of Oregon, and comprises an uncommonly unaltered and well-exposed set of Early to Mid Permian shallow marine and reefal limestones in the tectonically complex Permian present-day Pacific margin of western North America. The formation just predates Olson's Extinction; a mass extinction that occurred 273 million years ago in the early Guadalupian of the Permian period and which predated the Permian–Triassic extinction event.

=== Fossil content ===
Among others, the following fossils have been reported from the formation:

==== Brachiopods ====
- ?Alexenia occidentalis
- Anidanthus minor
- Antiquatonia cooperi
- Calliprotonia inexpectatum
- Kochiproductus transversus
- Krotovia oregonensis
- ?Marginifera profundosulcata
- Martinia berthiaumei
- Probolionia posteroreticulata
- ?Proboscidella carinata
- Rostranteris sulcatum 0
- Spiriferella pseudodraschei
- Stenoscisma cf. plicatum
- Tiramnia semiglobosa
- Yakovlevia transversa

=== Trilobites ===
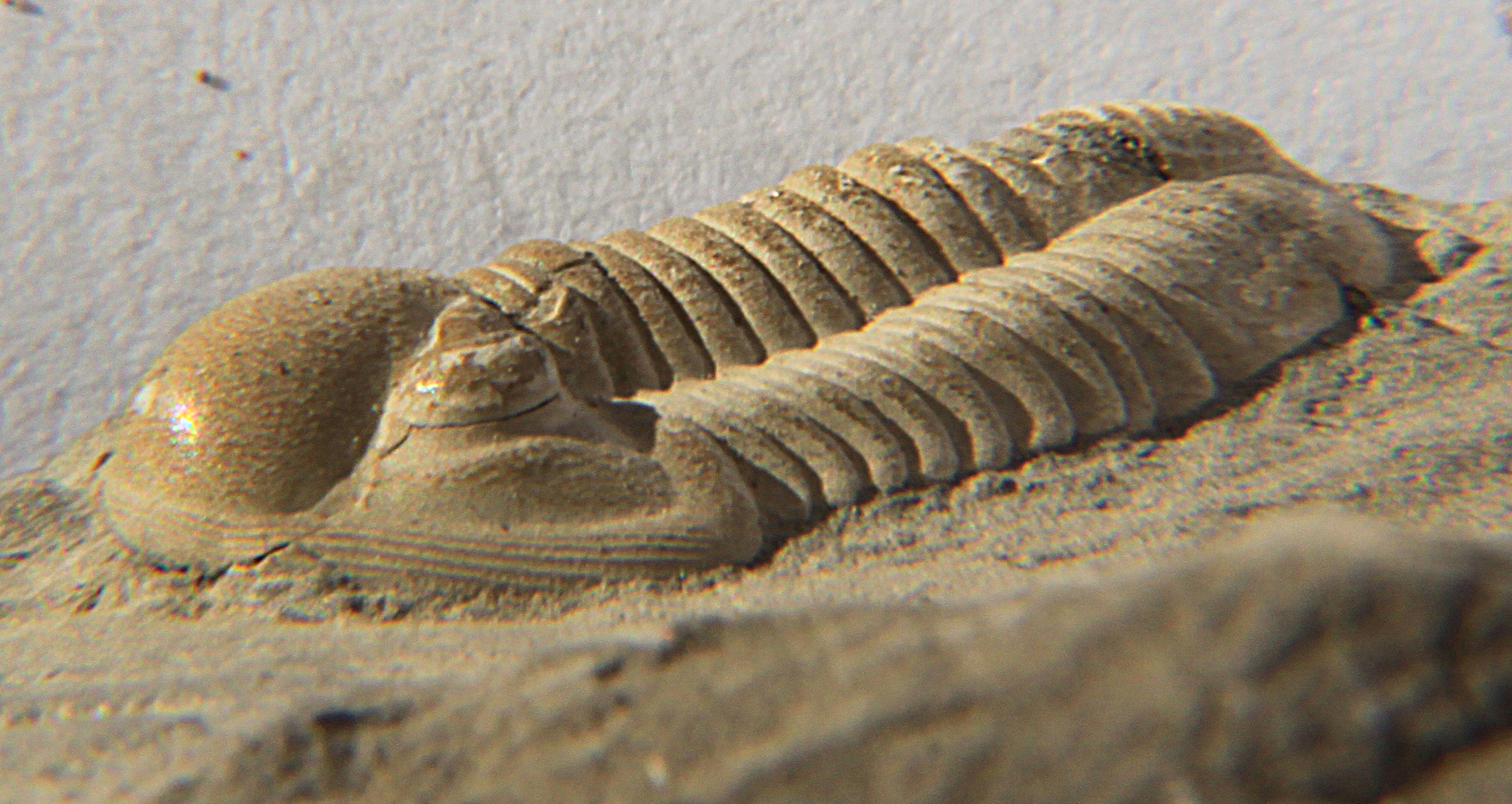
Cummingella belisama

- Proetida
  - Phillipsiidae
    - Cummingella (Cummingella) sp.

=== Rostroconchia ===
- Conocardiida
  - Conocardiidae
    - Arceodomus sphairikos

=== Gastropods ===
- Prosobranchia
  - Acteoninidae
    - Acteonina permiana

=== Polyplacophora ===
- Neoloricata
  - Acutichitonidae
    - Arcochiton soccus
  - Homeochiton triangularis
  - Gryphochitonidae
    - Gryphochiton planoplata
  - Lepidopleuridae
    - ?Chauliochiton sp.
    - Pterochiton sp.
  - Strobilepidae
    - Diadeloplax apiculatus

==== Corals ====
- Cystolonsdaleia berthiaumi
- Petalaxis occidentalis
- Wilsonastraea ochocoensis
- Protowentzelella sp.

== Correlations ==
=== Geologic correlations ===
- Cisuralian Series
- Sakmarian formations
- Artinskian formations
- Roadian formations
- Wordian formations
- Kungurian formations
- Permian North America
  - Esplanade Sandstone, Grand Canyon
  - Arroyo Formation, Texas
  - Road Canyon Formation, idem
  - Waggoner Ranch Formation, idem
  - Word Formation, idem
  - Cherry Canyon Formation, New Mexico and Texas
  - San Andres Formation, United States, idem
  - Wellington Formation, Kansas and Oklahoma
  - Orby Head Formation, Prince Edward Island
- Permian South America
  - Carapacha Formation, Argentina
  - Mangrullo Formation, Uruguay
  - Rio Bonito Formation, Brazil
- Permian Africa
  - Ganigobis Formation, Namibia
  - Gai-As Formation, idem
  - Huab Formation, idem
  - Whitehill Formation, idem
- Permian Europe
  - Tambach Formation, Germany
  - Treskelodden Formation, Svalbard, Norway
  - Arpinskaya Formation, Caucasus
  - Gnishik Formation, idem

=== Faunal correlations ===
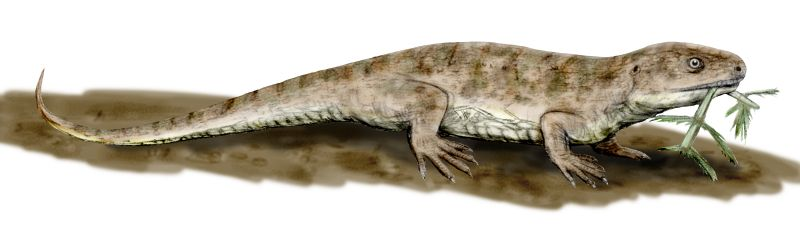
Restoration of Captorhinus from Oklahoma and Texas (Note: Oklahoma, Texas, Brazil and Zambia)

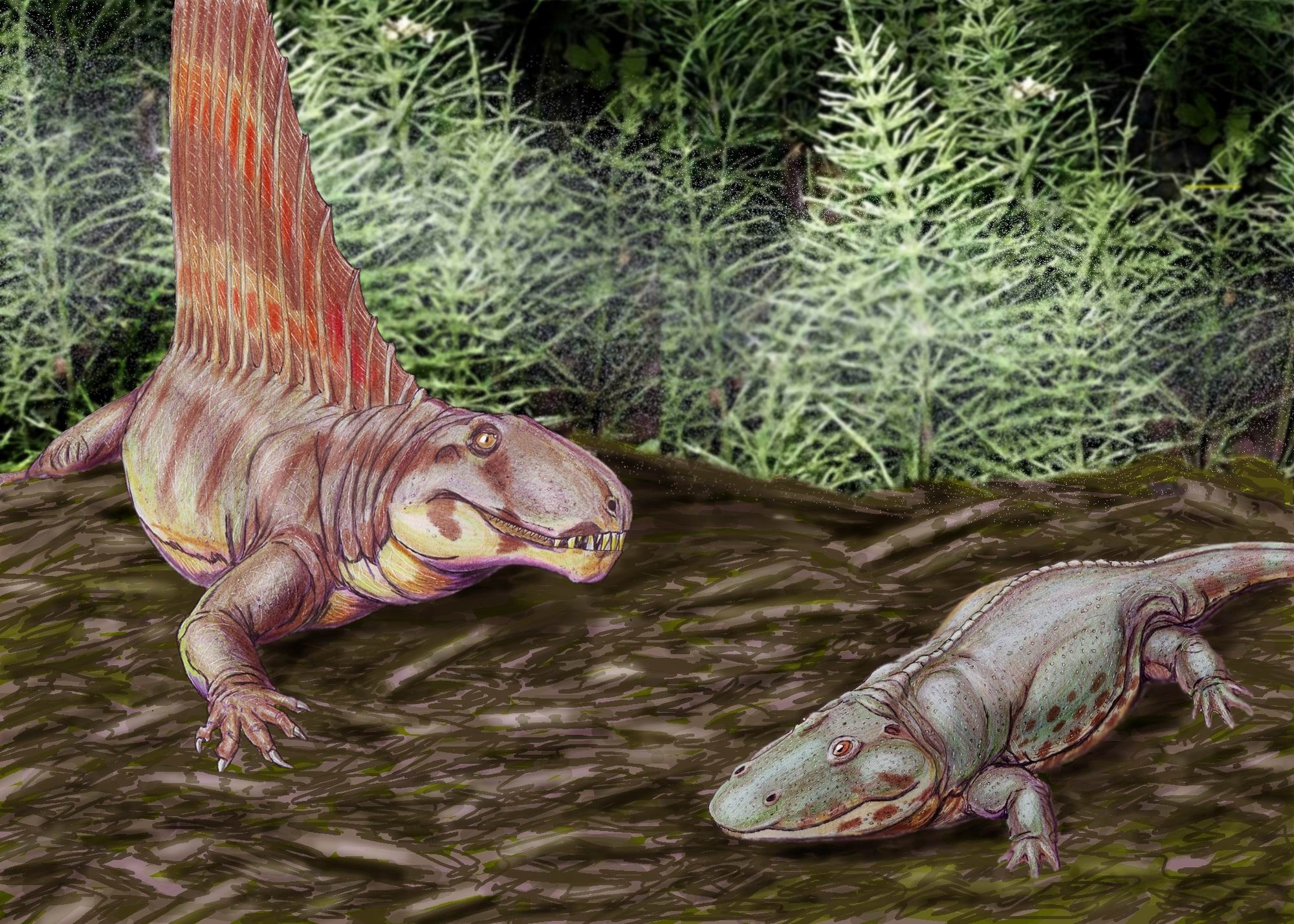
Restoration of Cisuralian, 295–272 Ma, Dimetrodon and the temnospondyl Eryops, both found in the Red Beds of Texas

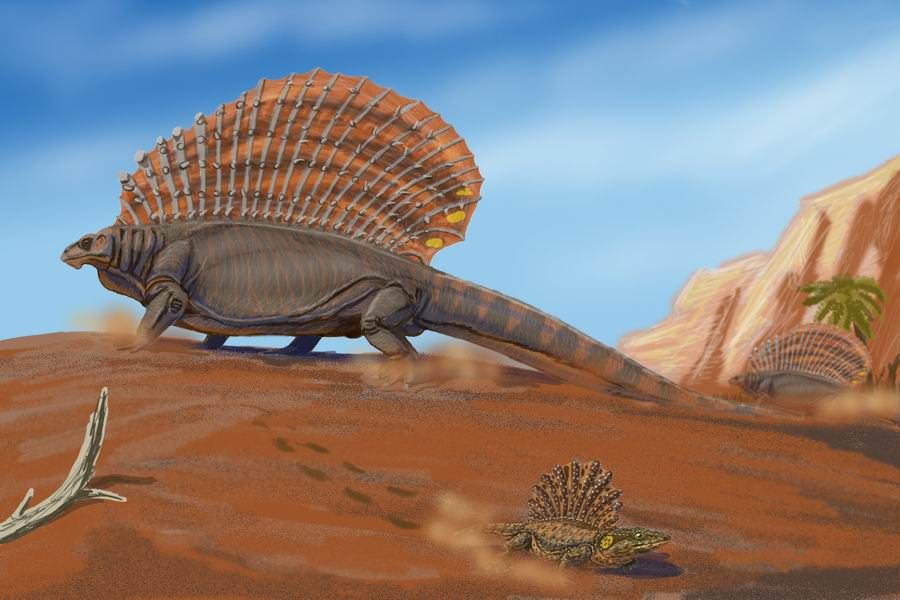
Platyhystrix (small, foreground) and Edaphosaurus from Early Permian Texas
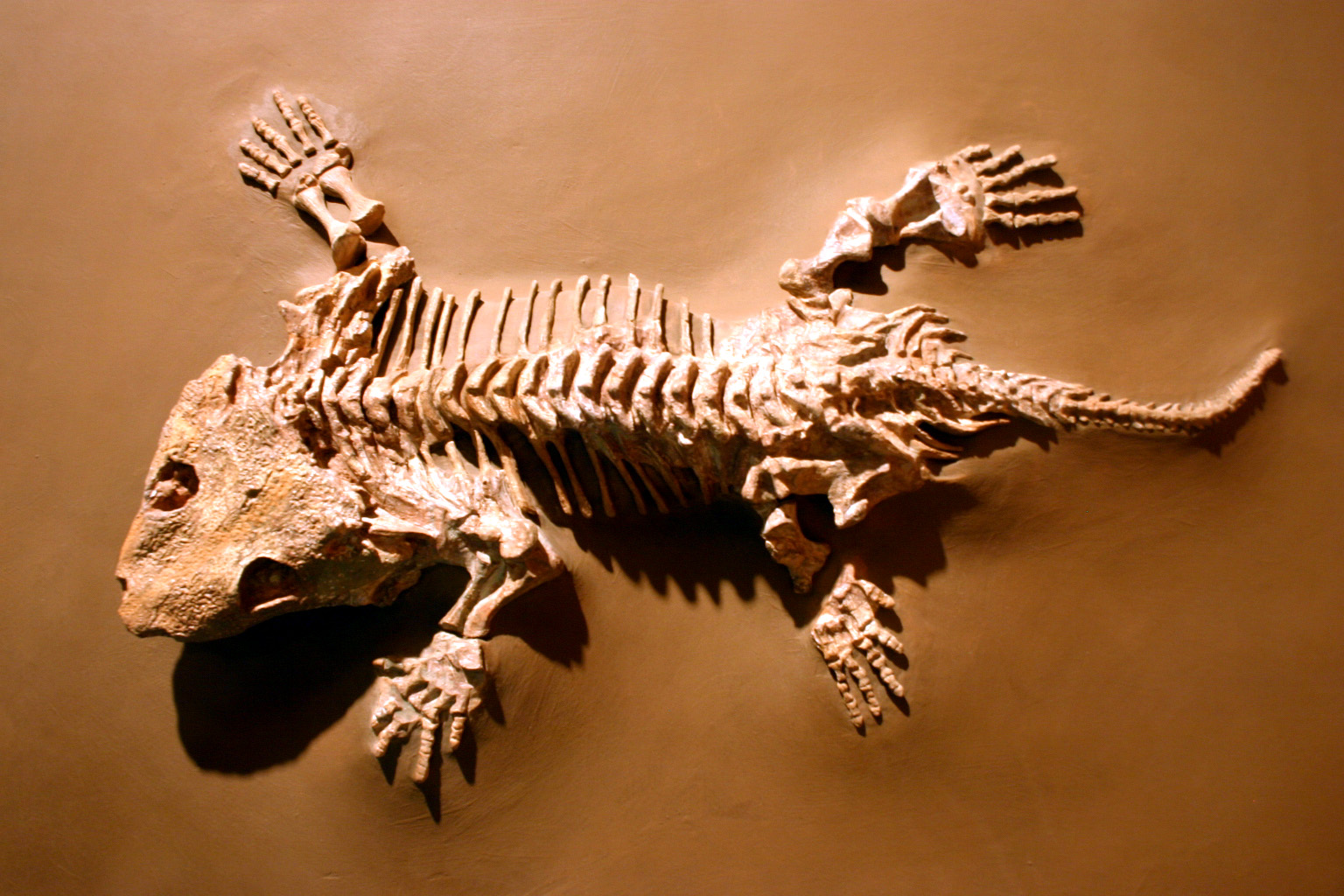
A fossil of Seymouria baylorensis displayed at the National Museum of Natural History

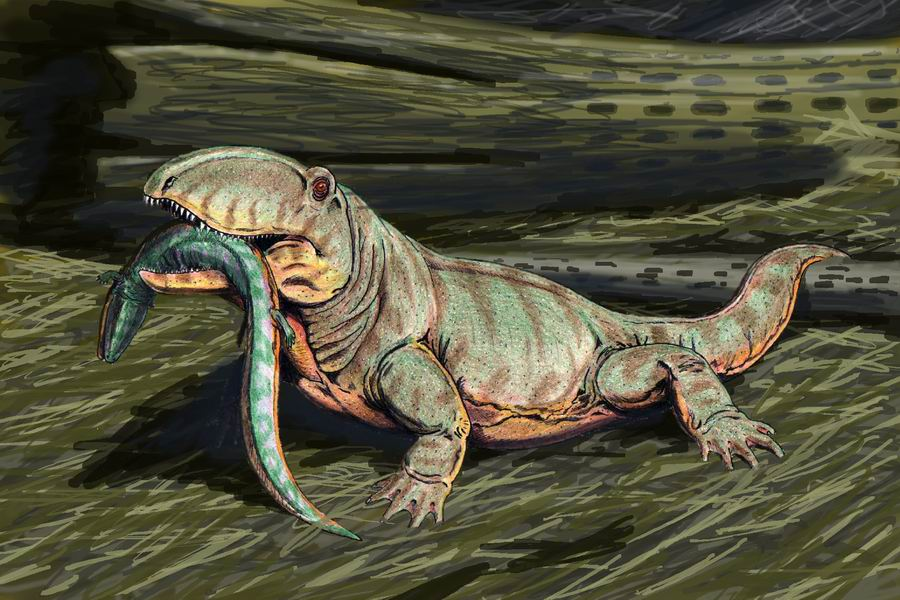
Ophiacodon widespread in Early Permian North America (Note: Arizona, Colorado, New Mexico, Utah: Cutler Formation; Kansas: Fort Riley, Chase Group; Ohio: Greene Formation, Dunkard Group, Oklahoma: Clyde & Wellington Formations, Texas: Admiral, Belle Plains & Clyde Formations, Wichita Group)

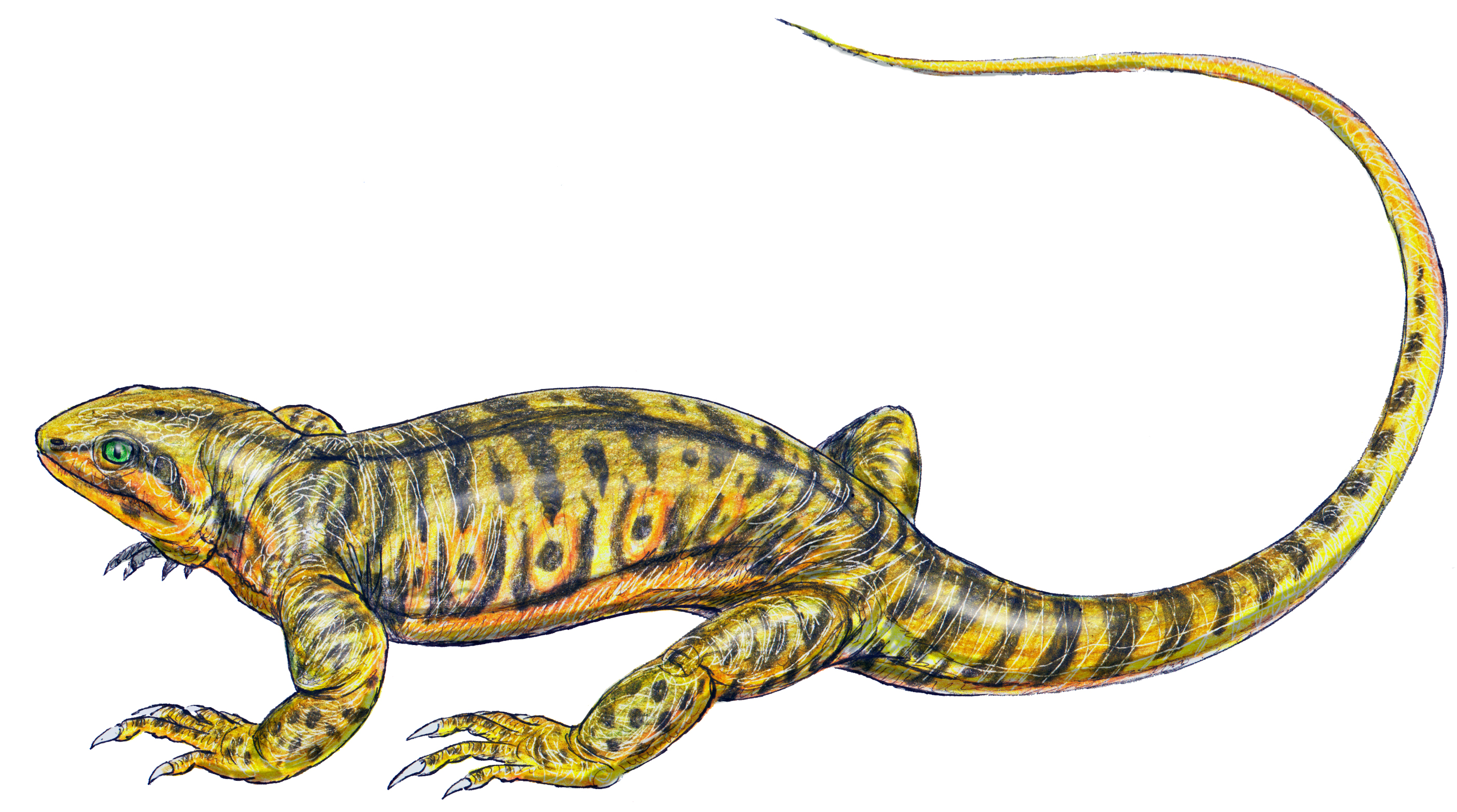
Callibrachion from Black Shales of Autun, near Margenne (Artinskian France)

== See also ==
- List of fossiliferous stratigraphic units in Oregon
- Alsea Formation, Whitneyan fossiliferous formation in Lincoln County, Oregon
- John Day Fossil Beds National Monument, Late Eocene to Early Miocene sequence of mammal-rich Lagerstätten:
- John Day Formation, Duchesnean to Hemingfordian
- Clarno Formation, Bridgerian to Duchesnean
- Crooked River caldera, Crook County, Oregon

== Sources ==
=== Bibliography ===
- Schmieder, M.; Schwarz, W. H.; Trieloff, M.; Tohver, E.; Buchner, E.; Hopp, J.; Osinski, G. R. (2014), "New ^{40}Ar/^{39}Ar dating of the Clearwater Lake impact structures (Québec, Canada) – Not the binary asteroid impact it seems?", Geochim. Cosmochim. Acta, 48: 304–324, Bibcode:2015GeCoA.148..304S, doi:10.1016/j.gca.2014.09.037
- Sahney, S.; Benton, M.J. (2008), "Recovery from the most profound mass extinction of all time", Proceedings of the Royal Society B: Biological Sciences, 275 (1636): 759–765, doi:10.1098/rspb.2007.1370, PMC 2596898, PMID 18198148
- Hanger, R. A.; Hoare, R.D.; Strong, E.E. (2000), "Permian Polyplacophora, Rostroconchia, and problematica from Oregon", Journal of Paleontology, 74 (2): 192–198, Bibcode:2000JPal...74..192H, doi:10.1666/0022-3360(2000)074<0192:PPRAPF>2.0.CO;2
- Bottomley, R.J.; York, D.; Grieve, R.A.F. (1990), "^{40}Argon-^{39}Argon dating of impact craters", Lunar and Planetary Science Conference Proceedings, 20, Proc. 20th Lunar Planet. Sci. Conf., LPI, Houston: 421–431, Bibcode:1990LPSC...20..421B
- Wardlaw, Bruce R.; Nestell, Merlynd K.; Dutro, Jr, J. Thomas (1982), "Biostratigraphy and structural setting of the Permian Coyote Butte Formation of central Oregon", Geology, 10 (1): 13–16, Bibcode:1982Geo....10...13W, doi:10.1130/0091-7613(1982)10<13:BASSOT>2.0.CO;2
- Cooper, G. A (1957), "Permian brachiopods from central Oregon", Smithsonian Miscellaneous Contributions, 134: 1–79
- Merriam, C.W.; Berthiaume, S.A. (1943), "Late Paleozoic formations of central Oregon", Geological Society of America Bulletin, 54 (2): 145–172, Bibcode:1943GSAB...54..145M, doi:10.1130/GSAB-54-145
- Merriam, C. W (1942), "Carboniferous and Permian corals from central Oregon", Journal of Paleontology, 16: 372–381
