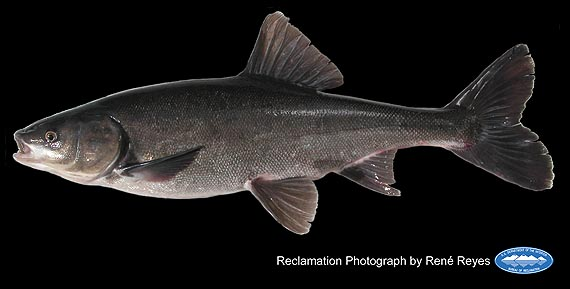

Conservation status
- Least Concern (IUCN 3.1)

Scientific classification
- Kingdom: Animalia
- Phylum: Chordata
- Class: Actinopterygii
- Division: Teleostei
- Order: Cypriniformes
- Family: Leuciscidae
- Subfamily: Laviniinae
- Genus: Orthodon; Girard, 1856
- Species: O. microlepidotus

Binomial name
- Orthodon microlepidotus (Ayres, 1854)

Synonyms
- Leuciscus microlepidotus Ayres, 1854; Gila microlepidota (Ayres, 1854)

= Sacramento blackfish =

Sacramento blackfish Temporal range: Early Pliocene-recent

Species of fish

The Sacramento blackfish (Orthodon microlepidotus) is a species of freshwater ray-finned fish belonging to the family Leuciscidae, which includes the daces, chubs, Eurasian minnows and related fishes. This species is endemic to central California. It is the only member of the monospecific genus Orthodon.

== Taxonomy ==
The genus name Orthodon comes from ὄρθος (órthos), meaning "straight", and ὀδούς (odoús), meaning "tooth". The specific epithet microlepidotus comes from μικρός (mikrós), meaning "small", and λεπίς (lepís), meaning "scale". The Orthodon genus is monotypical, making the blackfish the sole member of the genus and a generally unvaried species. Despite its unique characteristics, the blackfish has been recorded reproducing hybrids with the hitch and Tui chub, members of the blackfish's subfamily Leuciscinae also found in California.

In addition to the extant O. microlepidotus, two extinct species are known in †O. hadrognathus Smith, 1975 from the Pliocene-aged Glenns Ferry Formation of Idaho and the Miocene/Pliocene-aged Deer Butte Formation of Oregon, as well as †O. onkognathus Kimmel, 1975 from the Deer Butte Formation, suggesting that this genus had a wider range in the past. Fossils of the genus are also known from the Pliocene and Pleistocene of California.

== Description ==
=== Anatomy and morphology ===
Blackfish are named for their glossy black color. Younger individuals are more silvery, but darken as they age. The scales are unusually small, numbering 90–114 along the lateral line. The forehead has a straight-line profile, the eyes are small, and the terminal mouth slants upwards. The dorsal fin starts just behind the pelvic fins, and has 9–11 rays, while the anal fin has 8–9 rays, and the pelvic fins 10 rays. The pharyngeal teeth are distinctly long, straight, and knife-shaped, not seen in similar species in California; the grinding surface of the blackfish, used to process its food, is relatively narrow.

Adults commonly reach a length of 35 centimetres (14 in), but they have been recorded at up to 55 centimetres (22 in) in length.

The Sacramento blackfish can reach weights of up to 1.5 kg (3.3 lb) at maturity. The dark grey color of the adults can sometimes take on an olive hue, they have an elongated and narrow peduncle connecting the body to the caudal fin. It is one of the largest native minnow species in California, ranking third behind the Hardhead (Mylopharodon conocephalus) and the Sacramento Pikeminnow (Ptychocheilus grandis).

A species that is similar to the Sacramento blackfish are the hardhead, or Mylopharodon conocephalus, which can be identified and distinguished from the Sacramento blackfish by the presence of the premaxillary frenum, a piece of tissue which connects the mouth and jaw, a tissue that the Sacramento blackfish lacks. Additionally, the Hardhead has larger scales, and only 69 to 81 lateral scales, and a dorsal fin that originates behind the pelvic fins, where the Sacramento blackfish has a dorsal fin that originates in front of the pelvic fins. The Hardhead is different in coloration than the Blackfish, as it is more of a brown or bronze color rather than gray-green. Another similar species is the Sacramento Pikeminnow, Pytchocheilus grandis, (sometimes referred to as Sacramento Squawfish). The Pikeminnow can be distinguished from the Blackfish by the head shape, which is more compressed in the Pikeminnow compared to the Blackfish, and has a longer snout than that of the Blackfish. The Pikeminnow has larger and less lateral scales than the Blackfish, usually 65 to 78.

== Distribution and habitat ==
Blackfish are primarily denizens of the warm and cloudy waters found on the floor of the Central Valley, such as sloughs and oxbow lakes connected to the Sacramento and San Joaquin Rivers. They are also common in Clear Lake, Pajaro River, Salinas River, the small creeks that feed into San Francisco Bay. A population is present in the Russian River, believed to have been introduced. It is not native to the Russian River. They were introduced to the Carmel River, parts of Southern California and western Nevada. Early spawning allows them to thrive in reservoirs, and they have been spread to a number of California reservoirs via the California Aqueduct, and into Nevada via the Lahontan Reservoir (1964) where they have further colonized the Humboldt River drainage.

The Sacramento blackfish is found in several major California watersheds, including but not limited to: Sacramento River, San Francisco, San Joaquin River, Tulare Lake, and North Coast Watersheds.

The Sacramento blackfish prefers waters that run on the warmer side, one of the only native species that is able to survive in such environments. This temperature range is typically 22 to 28 °C (72 to 82 °F), though they have historically even endured temperatures higher than 30 °C (86 °F) and their young can survive at temperatures up to 37 °C (99 °F). This, combined with their unique manner of feeding, allows them to occupy a unique ecological niche that the fry of other native species are unable to occupy. They also have adapted to be able to tolerate and thrive in waters that are highly alkaline (pH 10) and highly saline (over 9 ppt).

The Sacramento blackfish comprises a commercial fishery in Clear Lake, which mostly serves the Chinese-American food and dining industry in California. They were first observed in Clear Lake area in 1873. The fishery was halted in 1948 in favor of the largemouth bass fishery, but was restored in 1954. Despite extended human activity including damming, water diversion, and the introduction of non-native species beginning in the 1880s through the 20th century, the Sacramento blackfish remains one of several native species originating in Clear Lake that survives to the present day.

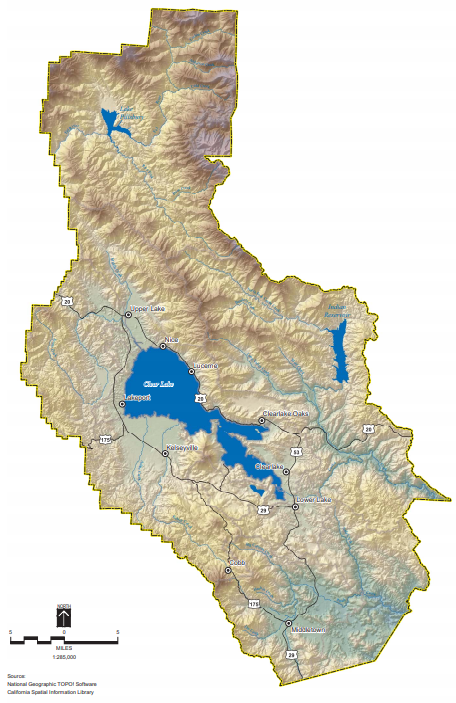

== Behavior and diet ==
=== Feeding behavior ===
Unlike most North American cyprinids, Sacramento blackfish filter feed on zooplankton, planktonic algae, and floating detritus, including rotifers, copepods, cladocerans, diatoms, and the like. While younger blackfish pick at food items individually, adults primarily use their oral cavity and gills to filter food from water. The blackfish opens and closes its mouth rapidly to pump large volumes of water, the food bits are caught in a patch of mucus on the roof of the mouth, where it is secreted by the palatal organ, and the food bits are swallowed with the mucus. The size of a blackfish influences its eating behavior; larger blackfish, with consequently larger oral cavities and easier means of filter feeding, are not seen pursuing individual prey like shorter blackfish. The gill rakers of the Sacramento blackfish are long and thin, similar to those of other species of filter feeders, but these gill rakers are not necessarily used for filtering the food material. Instead, the gill rakers act as directional structures to send the water stream they gulp up to the roof of their mouth in order to trap food material in the mucus.

=== Juveniles ===
Like many other Teleostean fish that filter-feed, Blackfish switch feeding methods after reaching maturity. Juvenile Blackfish actually use suction to pull larger zooplankton out of the water column for consumption individually rather than opening their mouths to filter-feed. This is primarily due to the fact that smaller fish have higher energy needs for growth than an adult fish has for maintenance, so they have to be more selective in their feeding in order to meet those needs, as filter-feeding results in a lower energy intake than particulate feeding.

=== Respiratory adaptations ===
Because the gills are used for both breathing and feeding, under hypoxic conditions, that is, freshwater conditions where oxygen levels are relatively low, the Sacramento blackfish will increase the level of gape and ventilation through gills and take up less oxygen from the water, though the level of O_{2} consumption by the individual will remain unaffected. Compared to consumption under normal conditions, however, they will take up dramatically less oxygen. Because of the anatomical and physiological adaptation of catching food particles in the mucus of the roof of the mouth, the Sacramento blackfish has the ability to continue suspension feeding even in conditions of low oxygen, something that would be far less efficient if following the typical model of filtering.

=== Life cycle ===
Sacramento blackfish can live up to 10 years. Most blackfish quickly grow during their first and second years, maturing at two to three years of age. The blackfishes' breeding season occurs from the spring through early summer, where males will fertilize female eggs in shallow waters. Due to physical stresses from reproduction, many blackfish find spawning difficult and die after two seasons, but some can reproduce up to four times.

Sacramento blackfish can reach maturity anytime from their 1st-4th years, and it varies due to individual growth rate. Females can produce and lay anywhere from ~15,000 eggs to ~345,000 eggs, depending on body size. Females choose spawning beds in areas where vegetation is thick. so as to foster egg adherence to objects along the riverbed or lake floor. Ideal water temperature for spawning occurs in the range of 12 to 24 °C (54 to 75 °F). Fry will hatch and emerge in the same region and remain in areas of higher vegetation. Male Sacramento blackfish can grow breeding tubercles, or bumps on the surface of the skin, and during mating season may also appear darker in color.

== Conservation status ==
The IUCN labels the Sacramento blackfish as being of "least concern"—though less abundant than previously in California's Central Valley, the blackfish is believed to be at low risk of endangerment.

=== Climate ===
Blackfish are known for their adaptations to environmental extremes, especially adapting to fluctuating water temperatures. A study by Joseph J. Cech Jr., a professor at the University of California, Davis, found that the blackfish was able to thrive in hypoxic environments. This means that they have developed adaptations that allow them to endure conditions that other species may not be able to survive under, including in water with low oxygen levels. Hypoxic conditions can be caused by higher temperatures, which means that this species is particularly climate-change resilient as compared to others.

=== Fishing ===
One of their biggest conservation concerns is fishing and the potential for overfishing, as the Sacramento Blackfish plays a large role in the Californian Chinese-American commercial fish industry. It is a minnow species of particular culinary appeal, as it is said to be one of the better-tasting species. They are sold live at many Asian fish markets in California. Historically, the Sacramento blackfish fishery comprised a majority of the commercial freshwater fishery supply in California. In 1960, Blackfish were valued at nearly $33,000, or 59% of the total value of all freshwater fish from California.

=== Aquaculture ===
They are also seen as a potential aquaculture species. This is because they can grow at a steady rate even on a plant-based diet, despite the fact that they are omnivorous. Studies have shown that they grow at an "acceptable rate" compared to other aquaculture species and have the capacity to grow at an even faster rate with the inclusion of proteins and lipids in their diet or even with natural nutrient availability in shallow water, making their species an admissible aquaculture candidate.

=== Ecological impact ===
The presence of blackfish in a system can provoke ecological changes, including changes in plankton production. Because Blackfish are filter feeders, they are primarily removing larger algal particles and zooplankton species from the water column. This reduces zooplankton predation and opens up space and resources for phytoplankton, specifically the smaller species of phytoplankton not being consumed by Blackfish, to become more abundant.
