= Nestucca Formation =

Geologic formation in Oregon, United States

- Stratigraphic range: Bartonian-Priabonian; ~40–34 Ma
- Type: Formation

Lithology
- Primary: Siltstone
- Other: Sandstone, shale

Location
- Coordinates: 45.2°N 124.0°W
- Approximate paleocoordinates: 45.5°N 111.7°W
- Region: Tillamook County, Oregon
- Country: United States

Type section
- Named for: Nestucca River
- Nestucca Formation (the United States) Nestucca Formation (Oregon)

The Nestucca Formation is a geologic formation in Oregon. It preserves fossils dating back to the Bartonian to Priabonian stages of the Eocene period.

== Fossil content ==
The formation has provided fossils of:

=== Vertebrates ===
Mammals

- Mammalia indet.

Fish

- Heptranchias howelli
- Galeocerdo sp.
- Raja sp.
- Isurus sp.

=== Invertebrates ===
Gastropods

- Calliovarica oregonensis

Bivalves

- Nucinella oregona

Decapods

- Macroacaena alseanus

== See also ==
- List of fossiliferous stratigraphic units in Oregon
- Paleontology in Oregon
- Alsea Formation
