= McKay Formation =

Geologic formation in Oregon, USA

- Stratigraphic range: Tortonian-Zanclean (Hemphillian); ~10.3–4.9 Ma
- Type: Formation

Lithology
- Primary: Tuffaceous sandstone

Location
- Coordinates: 45.5°N 118.8°W
- Approximate paleocoordinates: 45.4°N 116.1°W
- Region: Umatilla County, Oregon
- Country: United States

Type section
- Named for: McKay Reservoir
- McKay Formation (the United States) McKay Formation (Oregon)

The McKay Formation is a geologic formation in Oregon. It preserves fossils dating back to the Tortonian to Zanclean stages (Hemphillian) of the Neogene period.

== Fossil content ==
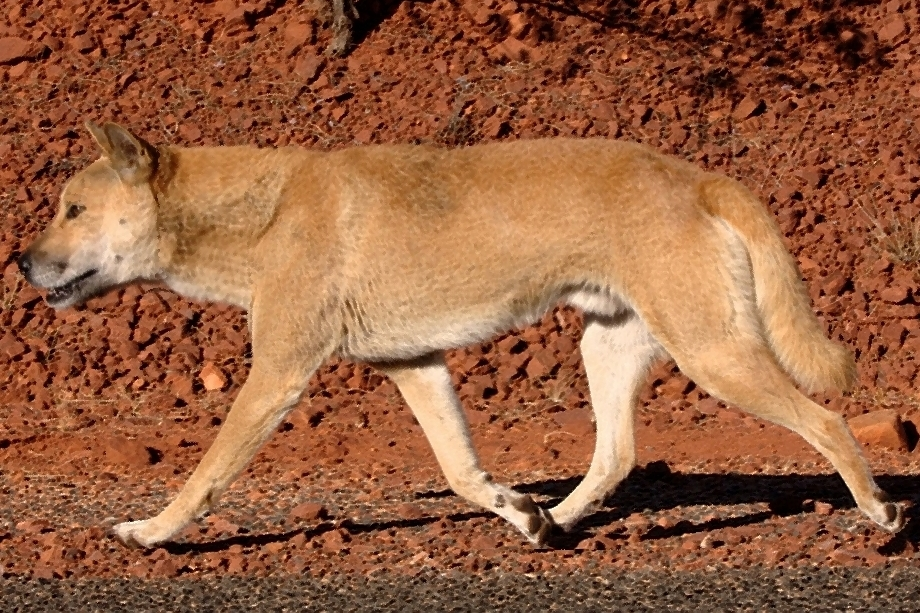
Epicyon

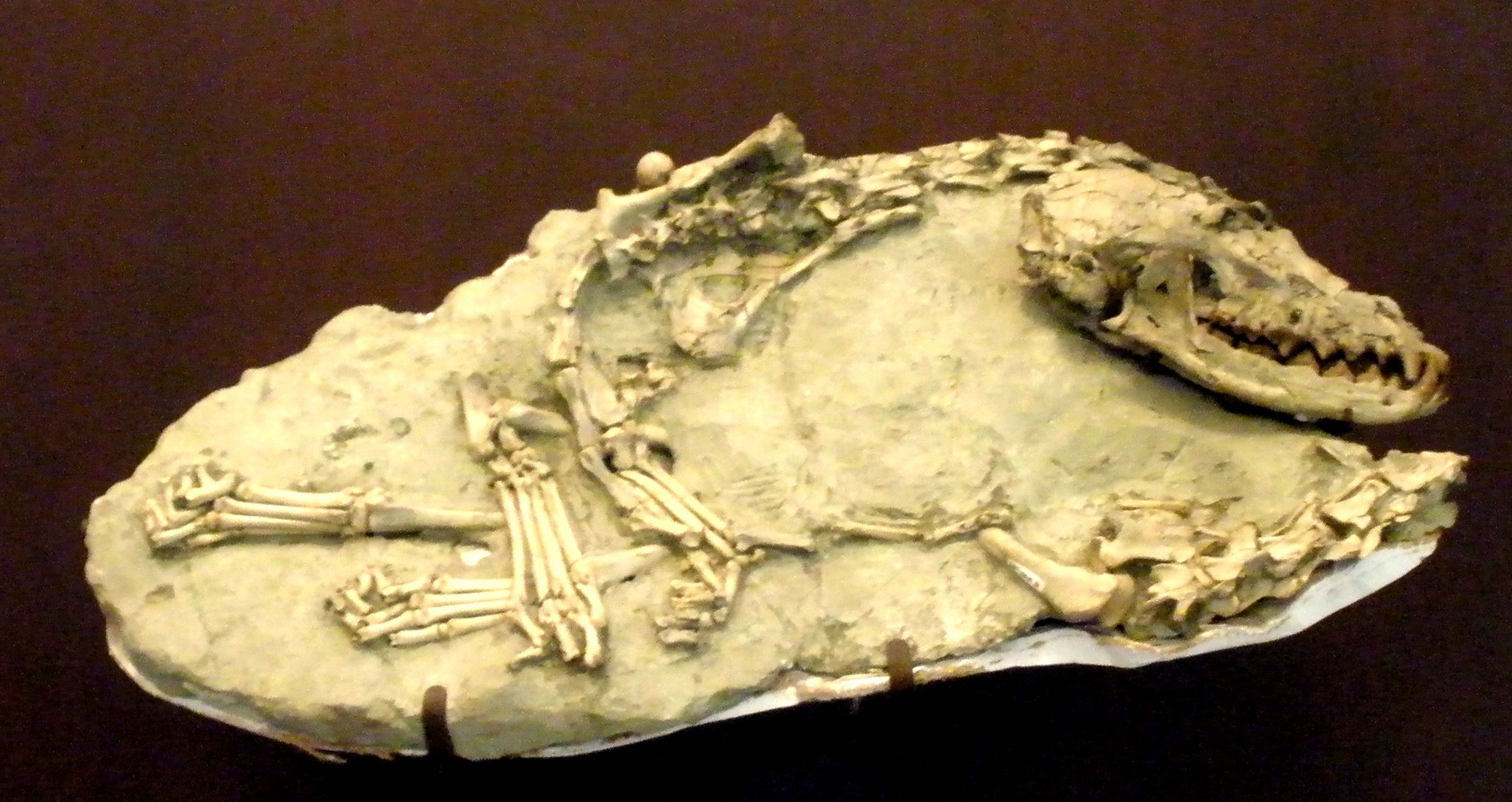
Eucyon davisi

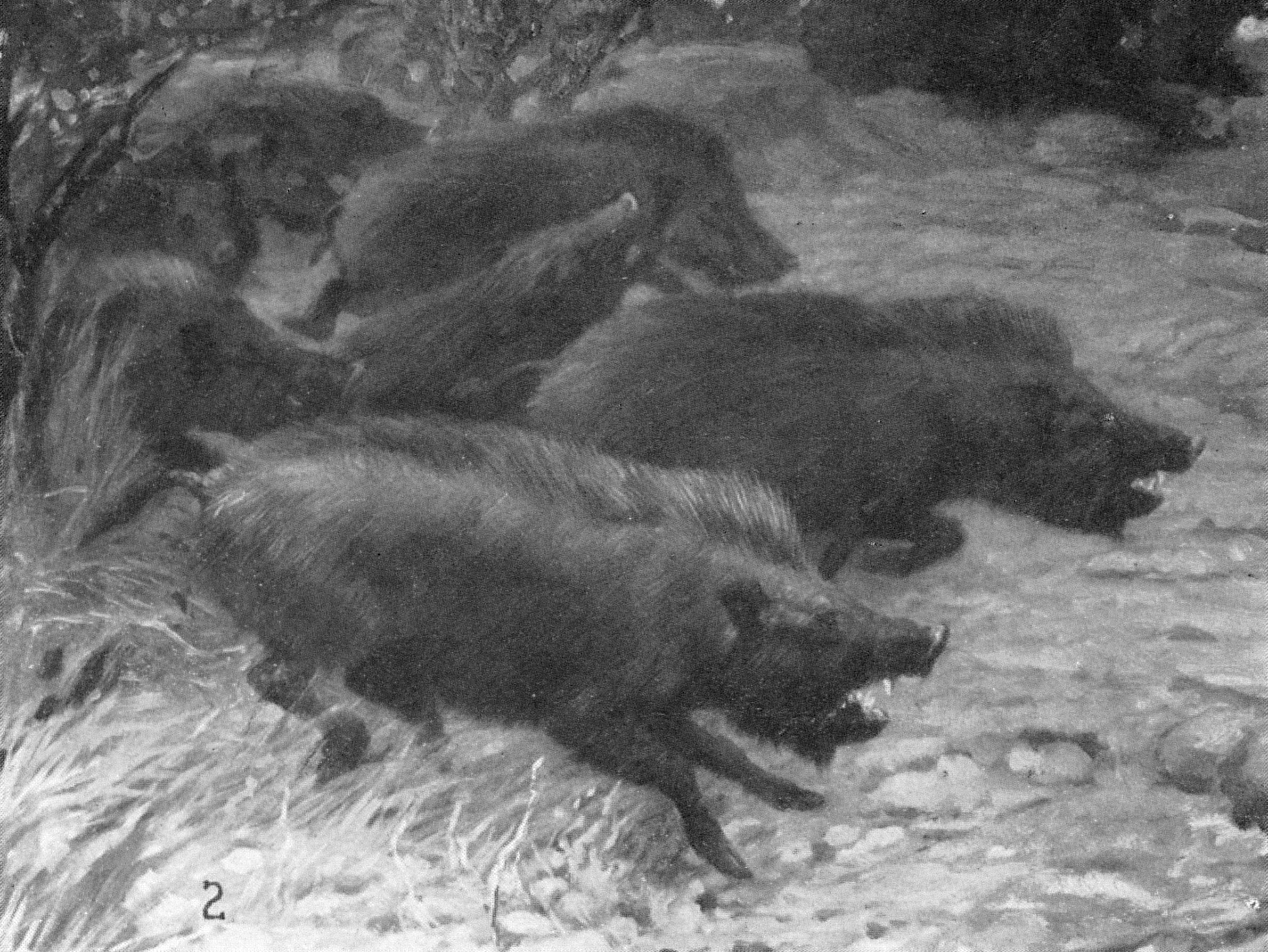
Platygonus

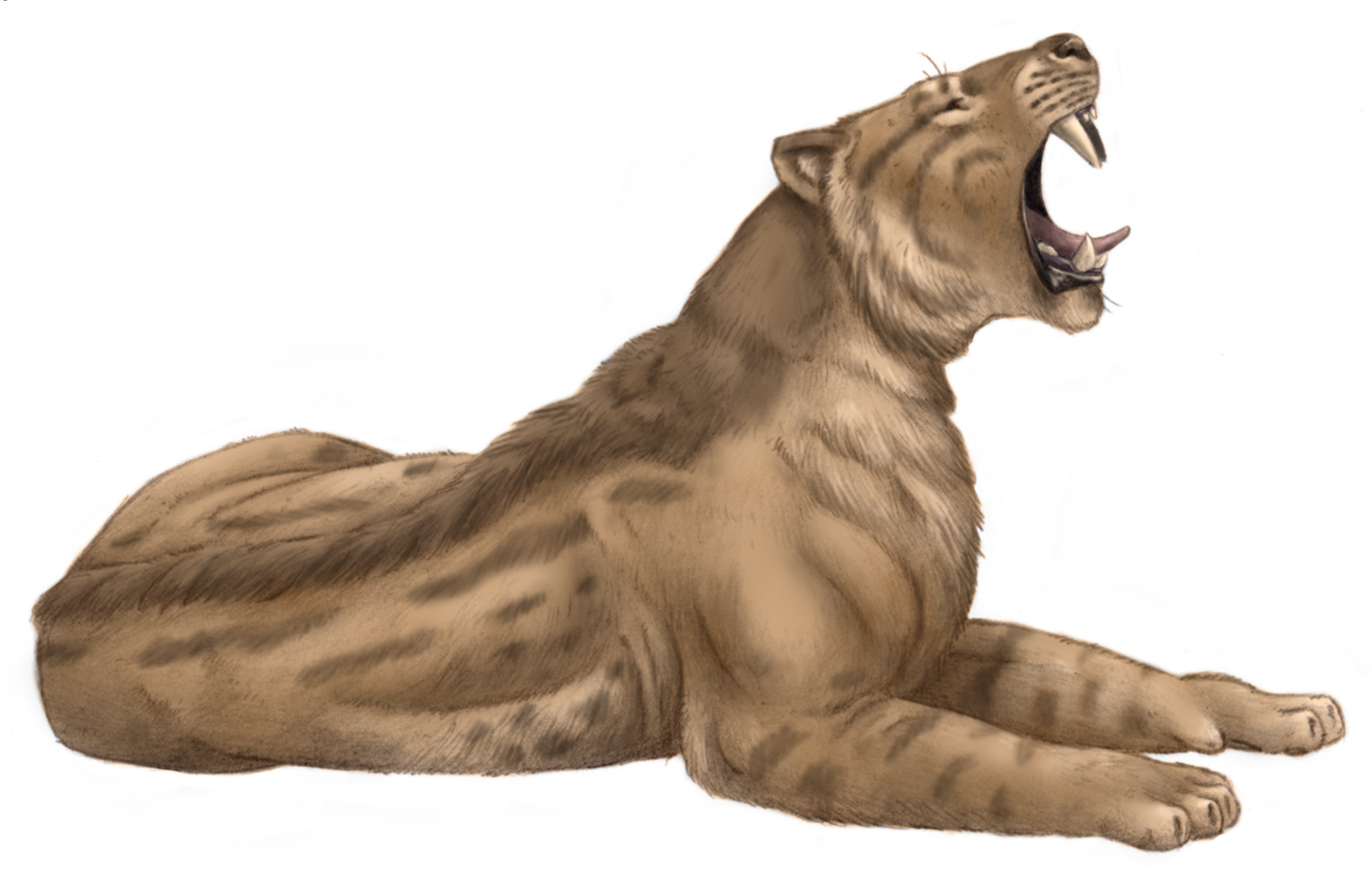
Machairodus

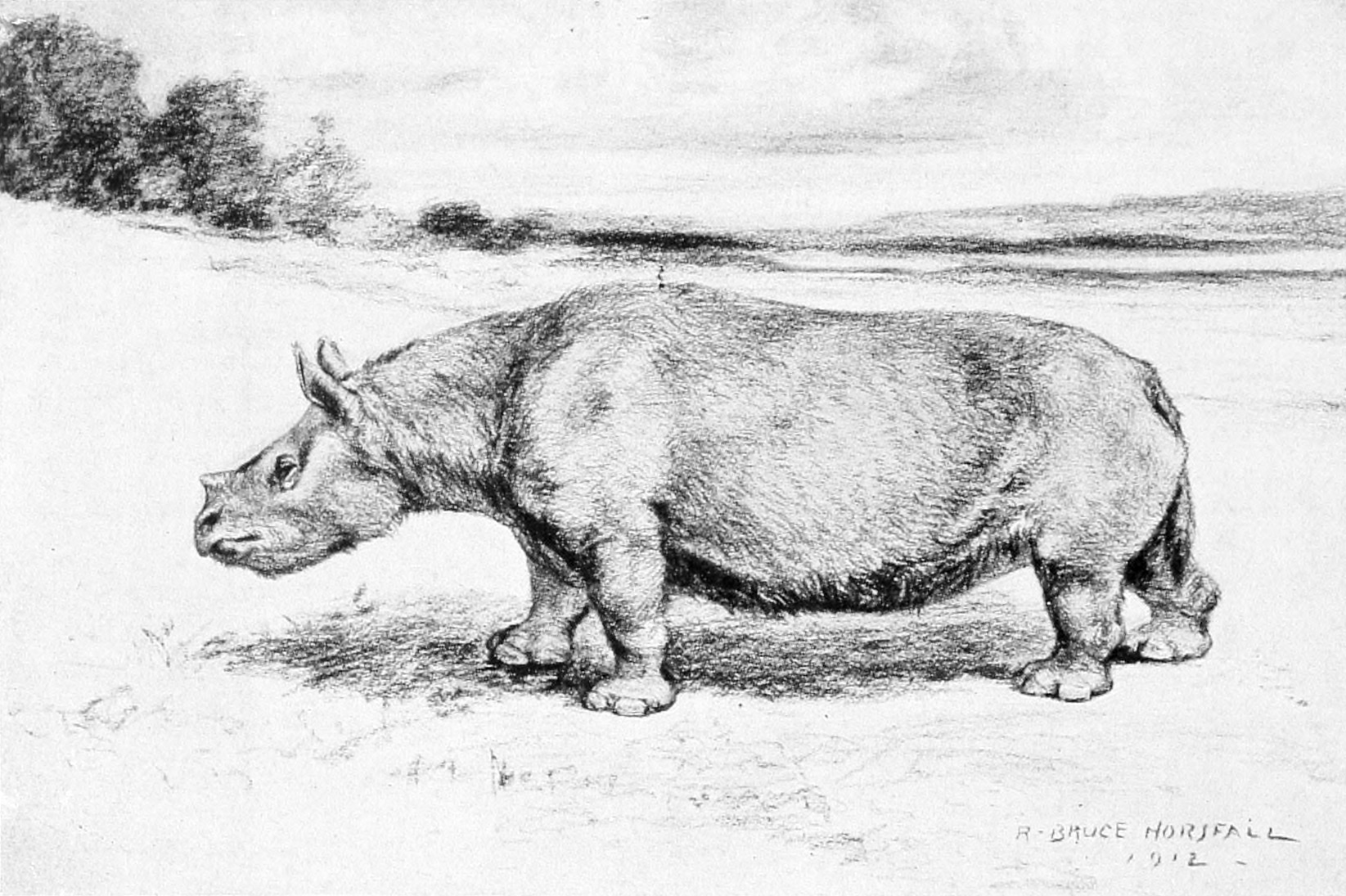
Restoration of Teleoceras

The following fossils have been reported from the formation:

=== Mammals ===
Rodents

- Cricetidae
  - Antecalomys cf. valensis
  - Basirepomys pliocenicus
  - Copemys esmeraldensis
  - Peromyscus antiquus
  - Prosomys mimus
- Aplodontidae
  - Liodontia sp.
- Sciuridae
  - Parapaenemarmota oregonensis
  - Spermophilus mckayensis
  - S. wilsoni
  - Neotamias sp.
- Eomyidae
  - Leptodontomys oregonensis
- Geomyidae
  - Parapliosaccomys oregonensis
- Perognathinae indet.
- Dipodomyinae indet.
- Heteromyidae
  - Oregonomys sargenti
- Castoridae
  - Castor sp.
  - Dipoides smithi
- Mylagaulidae
  - Hesperogaulus wilsoni
- Zapodidae
  - Pliozapus solus
- Leporidae
  - Hypolagus oregonensis
- Ochotonidae
  - Ochotona spanglei

Lipotyphla

- Talpidae
  - Gaillardia thomsoni
  - ?Neurotrichus columbianus
  - Scapanus cf. proceridens
  - Scapanus sp.
  - ?Scalopoides sp.

Perissodactyla

- Rhinocerotidae
  - Teleoceras hicksi
- Equidae
  - Hipparionini indet.
- Chiroptera indet.

Carnivora

- Mustelidae
  - Plesiogulo marshalli
  - Pliotaxidea nevadensis
  - Mustela sp.
- Canidae
  - Epicyon saevus
  - Eucyon davisi
- Felidae
  - Lynx longignathus
  - Nimravides catocopis

Proboscidea

- Mammutidae
  - ?Mammutidae indet.

Artiodactyls

- Tayassuidae
  - Platygonus brachirostris
- Camelidae
  - Camelidae indet.

=== Birds ===
- Scolopacidae
  - Bartramia umatilla
- Odontophoridae
  - Callipepla shotwelli
- Anatidae
  - Nettion bunkeri

== See also ==
- List of fossiliferous stratigraphic units in Oregon
- Paleontology in Oregon
