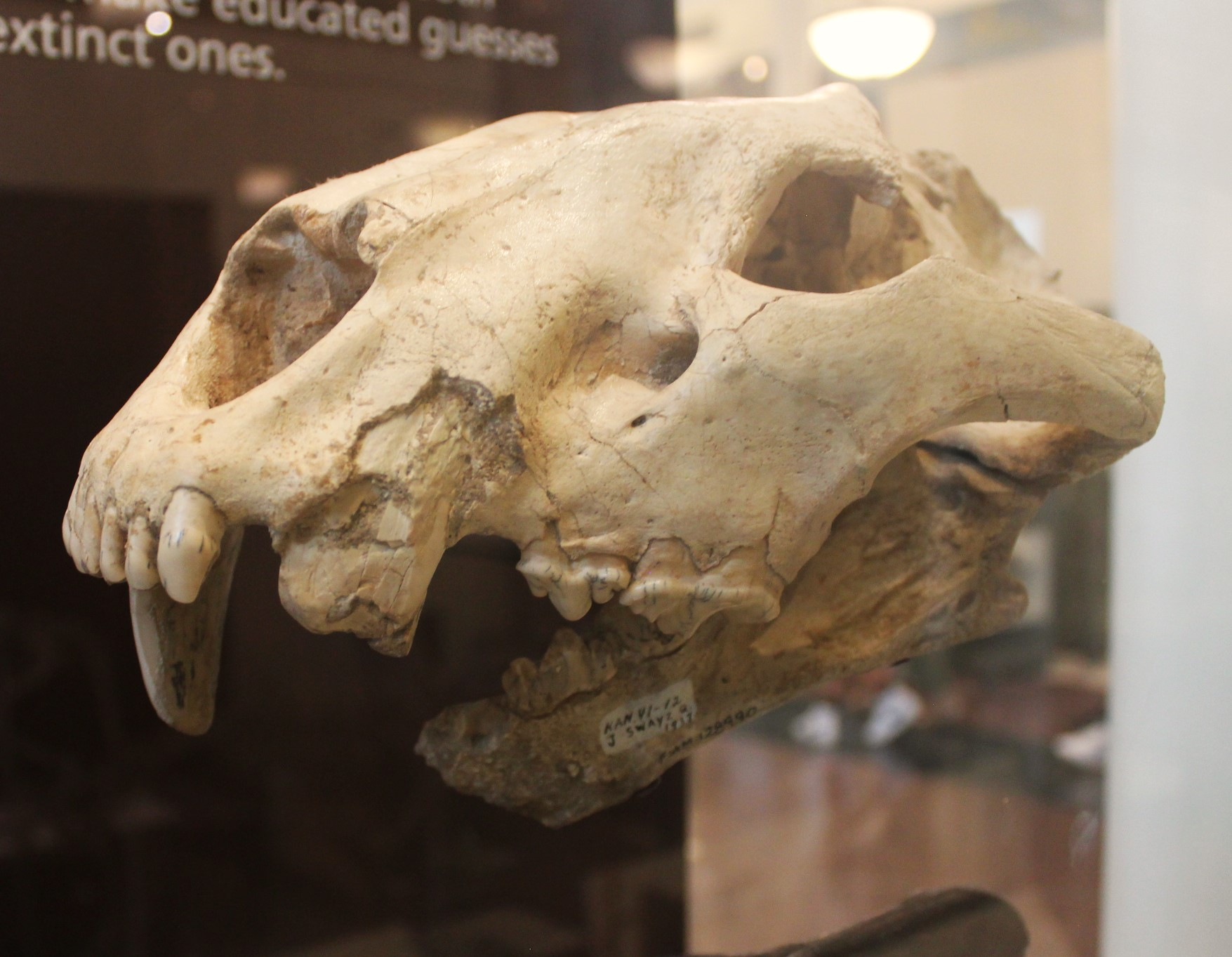
- N. catocopis skull, American Museum of Natural History

Scientific classification
- Kingdom: Animalia
- Phylum: Chordata
- Class: Mammalia
- Order: Carnivora
- Family: Felidae
- Subfamily: †Machairodontinae
- Tribe: †Homotherini
- Genus: †Nimravides; Kitts 1958

Type species
- Nimravides thinobates (Macdonald, 1948)

Other Species
- N. catocopis (Cope, 1887); N. pedionomus (MacDonald, 1948); N. hibbardi (Dalquest, 1969); N. galiani Baskin, 1981

Synonyms
- N. catocopis: Machaerodus catacopsis Cope, 1887; Machairodus catacopsis; Nimravides catacopsis; Nimravides catocopsis (misspelling); Machairodus lahayishupup Orcutt and Calede, 2021; Nimravides catocopis lahayishupup; N. thinobates: Pseudaelurus thinobates MacDonald, 1948; N. pedionomus: Pseudaelurus pedionomus; N. hibbardi: Pseudaelurus hibbardi

= Nimravides =

Nimravides Temporal range: Late Miocene (Clarendonian to Hemphillian), 11–6.5 Ma

Extinct genus of carnivores

Nimravides is a genus of extinct saber-toothed cats that was endemic in North America during the Late Miocene, from 11 to 6.5 Ma. Despite its scientific name, Nimravides does not belong to the Nimravidae, but is a true cat belonging to the family Felidae.

== Taxonomy ==
The genus Nimravides was originally described by Kitt in 1958 for the species "Pseudaelurus" thinobates. In 1969, Dalquest described the species Pseudaelurus hibbardi. The species Machaerodus catocopis was described by Cope in 1887, based on a partial mandible from the Loup Fork Beds. The species Pseudaelurus thinobates and Pseudaelurus pedionomus were both described by James Reid MacDonald in 1948.

In 1975, Martin and Schultz reassigned Machairodus catacopsis to Nimravides and suggested that N. thinobates was a junior synonym of the former species. The species N. galiani was first described in 1981 based on fragmentary material from the Love Bone Beds in Florida. The same paper also described additional fossils of N. thinobates compared to the holotype of N. catacopsis, and concluded that N. catacopsis was best considered a nomen vanum and the material assigned to it should be considered N. thinobates.

"Pseudaelurus" pedionomus was reassigned to Nimravides in 1990 by Beaumont. In 2003, Tom Rothwell reassigned Pseudaelurus hibbardi to Nimravides. And in 2010 it was suggested that N. hibbardi was a junior synonym of Adelphailurus kansensis. In 2013, Mauricio Anton et al. suggested that N. catacopsis should be re-reassigned back to Machairodus, regarding the taxonomic placement of the other species as uncertain. Jiangzuo et al. 2022 retained N. catocopis within Nimravides, and in addition, reclassified M. lahayishupup to N. catocopis lahayishupup, considering it as a local subspecies due to its dental difference being a intraspecific variation based on the large sample.

While often regarded as true sabertooth cat of the subfamily Machairodontinae, some authors have controversially argued that Nimravides is more closely related to Felinae than to Machairodontinae.

== Description ==
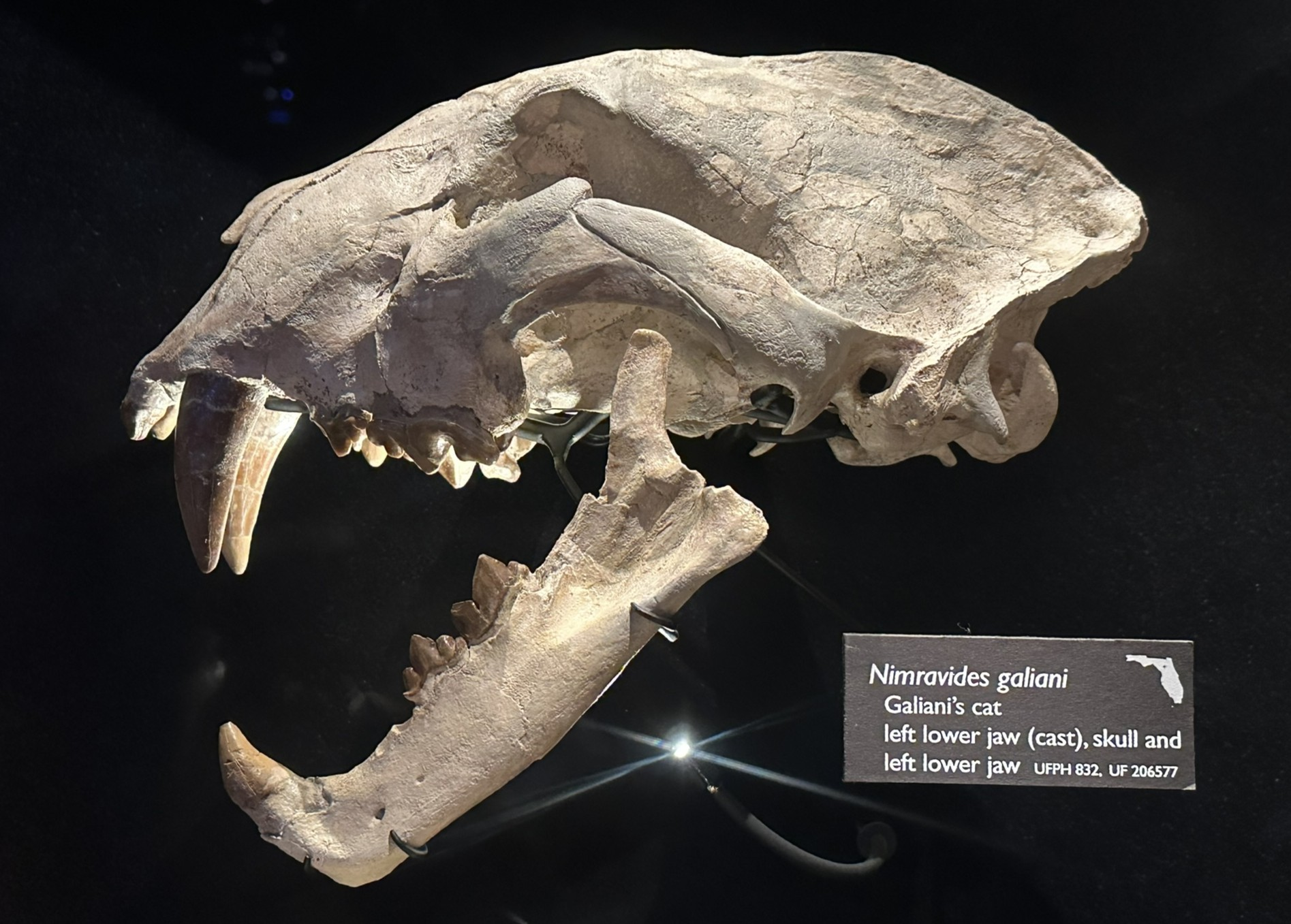
Skull cast of N. galiani, Florida Museum of Natural History

Nimravides galiani is estimated to weigh 120 kg (260 lb) on average, according to Meachen 2012. Jiangzuo et al. 2022 suggested it didn't overlap with N. catocopis in size. Compared to N. catocopis and Machairodus aphantistus, it had a much smaller sexual dimorphism due to the smaller infraspecific variation in size. Many of its postcranial features resembles that of jaguars.

N. thinobates, in a 2012 study, was estimated to weigh 115 kg (254 lb) on average. However, Jiangzuo et al. 2022 suggested it was actually similar in size to M. aphantistus, which averaged around 153 kg (337 lb).

N. catocopis was the largest species, with adults measuring 100 cm (1.0 m) at the shoulder and was similar in size to a large tiger. It was also possessed of long, powerful legs and a long back. Based on mandibular and dental sizes, this species was slightly larger than M. aphantistus on average. Hh2 populations of N. catocopis grew larger than Hh1 populations, this is supported by two large males, from the Ogallala group, having femurs that rivaled the femur length of the American lion. The subspecies N. c. lahayishupup was also quite large. Based on 7 specimens, it is estimated that the subspecies averaged 274 kg (604 lb), based on the size range of 241–348 kg (531–767 lb). A humerus bone measuring 18 in (46 cm) attributed to the subspecies suggest that this cat was far larger than a modern lion, which has a 13 in (33 cm) humerus, and is considered to be the largest specimen. This specimen is estimated to have weighed 427 kg (941 lb), making this species among the largest felids to ever live.

== Paleobiology ==
Forelimb morphology suggests N. galiani was similar to that of extant felids, due to that it likely practiced strangulation method, relied heavily on its dew claw, and likely practiced pounce-pursuit. The authors suggest due to competition with other open plain carnivorans, it could've seek shelters among trees along forest boundaries or hide prey when under stress.

N. catocopis may have preferred prey weighing 413–1,386.3 kg (911–3,056 lb) with maximum prey size being 1.6 t (3,500 lb), although it may not have been a large prey specialist. It is estimated that N. catocopis has a jaw gape of 67.91 degrees, with an effective gape of 38 degrees. Considering that, the effective gape is most vital when it comes to prey capture, the authors argued considering the fact that most predators had a jaw gape between 45 and 65 degrees, likely suggests not all saber tooth predators were large prey specialist. ^{Including supplementary materials}

== Paleoecology ==
N. galiani was found in the Love Bone Beds deposits (of Clarendonian Age), which had a mixture of grassland, riverine forest, and marshes, in which it would have shared territory with herbivorous animals like the amphibious rhinoceros Teleoceras, the protoceratid Synthetoceras, the camel Aepycamelus, horses like Neohipparion and Nannippus, and coexisting with barbourfelini Barbourofelis loveorum and borophaginae canids such as Epicyon and Borophagus. B. loveorum and N. galiani likely niche partitioned and competition would've been minimal due to different prey and habitat preferences. The robust forelimbs of Barbourofelis suggests it preferred forested environments, while Nimravides preferred more open habitats, such as open grasslands. The larger sizes of the Nimravides' metacarpals, suggests it would've preyed upon larger animals compared to Barbourofelis.

N. catocopis was found in Hemphillian rocks such as Chalk Hills Formation, Rattlesnake Formation, McKay Formation, and Ogallala Formation. Rattlesnake Formation was a floodplain environment where the Rattlesnake Ash Fall Tuff is present. It coexisted with herbivores such as the aceratheriinae rhino Teleoceras fossiger, "shovel tusker" amebelodontidae Amebelodon, extinct horse Pliohippus spectans, and extinct lamini Hemiauchenia vera. Other carnivorans present in the formation was the agriotheriini bear Indarctos oregonensis and extinct fox Vulpes stenognathus. Some of these herbivores, such as Teleoceras and Hemiauchenia, may have been preyed upon by Nimravides.

Due to its initial rarity and different habitat preferences, Jiangzuo et al. suggested that the arrival of the fellow sabertooth cat Amphimachairodus into North America was not the direct cause of the extinction of Nimravides; instead, they suggested that Nimravides became extinct as part of a climate change induced faunal turnover event during the Hemphillian stage.
