= Days Creek =

Days Creek may refer to:

- Days Creek, Oregon, an unincorporated community in Oregon
- Days Creek Formation, geologic formation in Oregon
- Days Creek Charter School, a school in Oregon
- Days Creek (Arkansas), a creek in Eastern Texas and Western Arkansas
