= Aldrich Mountains Group =

Geologic group in Oregon, United States

- Stratigraphic range: Triassic
- Type: Group
- Sub-units: Fields Creek Formation, Laycock Graywacke, Murderers Creek Graywacke, Keller Creek Shale

Location
- Region: Oregon
- Country: United States

The Aldrich Mountains Group is a geologic group in Oregon. It preserves fossils dating back to the Triassic period.

== See also ==
- List of fossiliferous stratigraphic units in Oregon
- Paleontology in Oregon
