= Redmond–Bend Juniper State Scenic Corridor =

Protected area in Oregon, United States

Redmond-Bend Juniper State Scenic Corridor
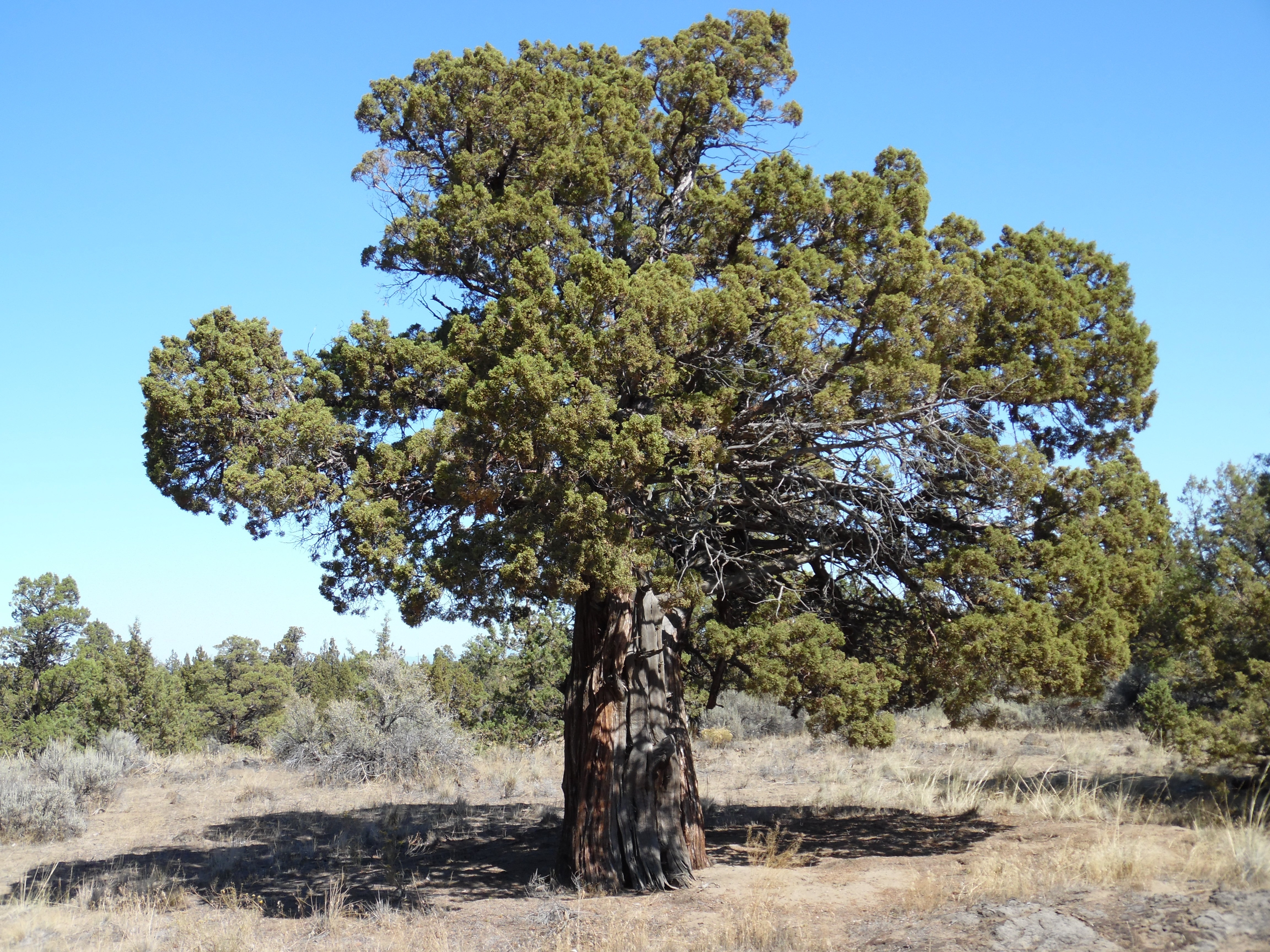
- Old-growth juniper tree in the scenic corridor

- Location within Oregon Location within the United States
- Location: Deschutes County, Oregon
- Nearest city: Bend and Redmond, Oregon
- Coordinates: 44°11′03″N 121°14′27″W
- Area: 352 acres (142 ha)
- Created: 1945
- Operator: Oregon Parks and Recreation Department

Redmond–Bend Juniper State Scenic Corridor (also known as Redmond-Bend Juniper State Park, Redmond-Bend Juniper Wayside, or Juniper Wayside) is a collection of ten unimproved land parcels administered by the Oregon Parks and Recreation Department. The parcels are located along U.S. Route 97 between Bend and Redmond, Oregon, United States. It is named for the large western juniper trees found on the parcels. The scenic corridor is completely undeveloped with no trails or park facilities of any kind.

== Scenic Corridor ==
The Oregon Parks and Recreation Department is responsible for overseeing the Redmond–Bend Juniper State Scenic Corridor. The scenic corridor serves only as a buffer of native habitat along Route 97 between Bend and Redmond, giving the landscape along the highway corridor a natural high desert appearance. The department has no plans to develop any of the scenic corridor parcels.

The Redmond–Bend Juniper State Scenic Corridor is named for the large western junipers found in the area. Many of these juniper trees are several hundred years old. The scenic corridor is made up of ten separate parcels of land scattered along a 10 miles (16 km) section of U.S. Route 97, between Bend and Redmond in Central Oregon. Most of the parcels are less than 40 acres (16 ha). The parcels are bisected by the Route 97 forming a corridor with Oregon Parks and Recreation Department land on both side of the roadway as the highway passes through each parcel. The state scenic corridor covers a total of 352 acres (142 ha). Additional scenic corridor land along U.S. Route 97 between Bend and Redmond is owned by Deschutes County. Together, the state and county scenic corridor lands cover approximately 600 acres (240 ha).

The Redmond–Bend Juniper State Scenic Corridor is not a typical park. There are no facilities on any of the scenic corridor parcels. In addition, camping, hunting, motorcycles, and off-road vehicles are not allowed on any part of the scenic corridor. Hiking and nature viewing are the only activities permitted within the scenic corridor boundaries. However, the individual parcels are small and none of them have any developed trails to facilitate hiking.

Accessing some of the scenic corridor parcels can be difficult. Only one parcel has direct road access from U.S. Route 97. That access point is not marked so it can be hard to locate along the highway. None of the other sites have access from Route 97. Many of the parcels are bordered by private property with no road connecting the state land to a public thoroughfare, making access to the parcels problematic. In addition, there are no signs identifying any of the parcels as state land. Geological survey markers are the only way to identify these lands as state property.

== Ecology ==
Old-growth juniper woodlands are generally defined as juniper groves where the majority of the trees have existed for at least 150 years in an undisturbed environment. That means the stands were present before the arrival of white settlers in the western United States. In addition to their scenic value, old-growth juniper woodlands provide critical wildlife habitat and help preserve the western juniper's gene pool. Human activities have reduced the old-growth juniper woodlands in central Oregon. However, some of the old-growth stands are preserved in areas like the Redmond–Bend Juniper State Scenic Corridor. Many of the remaining stands are located on lands administered by the Bureau of Land Management, which is actively working to protect old-growth juniper groves throughout central Oregon.

The age and large size of central Oregon's old-growth junipers is likely due to the local weather conditions and deep pumice soil found in the area. The porous pumice soil allows the limited rainfall, an average of only 15 inches (380 mm) per year, to be captured in the subsurface water table where the junipers can draw on it throughout the year. A healthy and well-distributed understory with a low proportion of young junipers, an abundance of native plant species, and relatively undisturbed ground is characteristic of old-growth juniper woodlands.

The wildlife found in the areas around the Redmond–Bend Juniper State Scenic Corridor sites are typical of central Oregon's high desert country. Among the animals found in and around the scenic corridor parcels are pronghorn, mule deer, coyotes, jackrabbits, ground squirrels, and chipmunks. Birds include warblers, woodpeckers, sage grouse, chukar partridges, and golden eagles.

== History ==
The scenic corridor was created in 1945 by the Oregon Parks and Recreation Department. The parks department acquired 635 acres (257 ha) from Oregon's State Land Board in order to protect undeveloped areas with large numbers of old-growth western juniper trees and create a scenic corridor of native high desert habitat along Route 97. By protecting the old-growth juniper landscape, the state also hoped to draw tourists to central Oregon.

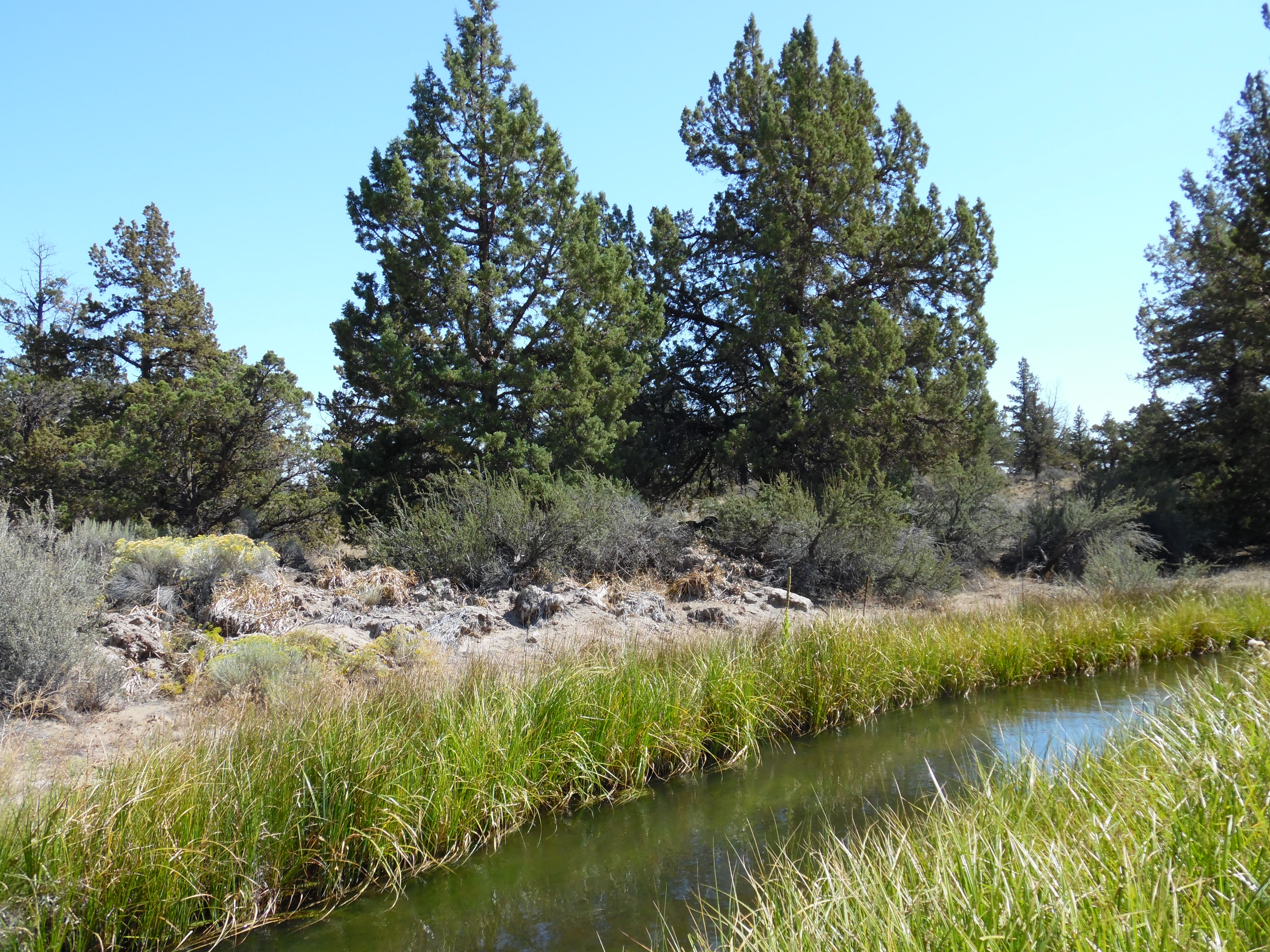
Irrigation canal flowing through a corridor site

In 1999, the Oregon Parks and Recreation Department transferred title to some of the scenic corridor land to Deschutes County. However, those lands have not been developed and remain part of the scenic corridor's native landscape.

At the north end of the scenic corridor, a 40-acre (16 ha) parcel was located inside the city limits of Redmond. That land was sold to the city in 2006. The city later sold the parcel to a private company to facilitate a hotel development project. The sales agreement included specific conditions that limit the use of the property.

In 2009, the State of Oregon sold an 11-acre (4.5 ha) portion of one of the corridor parcels to the Central Oregon Irrigation District. The property is on the east side of Route 97 in an area where the Pilot Butte Canal runs close to the highway. The Oregon Central Oregon Irrigation District subsequently built a small hydro-electric plant on the property, utilizing the water flow in the canal to generate electricity. The plant now produces enough electricity to power 4,000 central Oregon homes.

In 2011, the Oregon Parks and Recreation Department approved a land exchange that transferred 6.4 acres (2.6 ha) of Redmond–Bend Juniper State Scenic Corridor property to the Oregon Department of State Lands in exchange for 75 acres (30 ha) of timber land in Lincoln County. The Lincoln Country property is located near Ona Beach State Park and Beaver Creek State Natural Area. The parks department also paid the Department of State Lands $32,450 to make up the difference in the value of the two pieces of land.

Today, the Redmond–Bend Juniper State Scenic Corridor is managed by the High Desert District, a subdivision of the Oregon Parks and Recreation Department. The sites are part of the district's Tumalo Management Unit, which has its headquarters in Bend, Oregon. Because the scenic corridor has no facilities to maintain, the parks and recreation department staff only provides basic custodial oversight of the scenic corridor sites. The department has no plans for developing any part of the Redmond–Bend Juniper State Scenic Corridor. Nearby state parks with public facilities, trails and interpretive signs include Tumalo State Park, Cline Falls State Scenic Viewpoint, Smith Rock State Park, Pilot Butte State Scenic Viewpoint, and Peter Skene Ogden State Scenic Viewpoint.

== Geo-location error ==
Several of the online geo-location maps incorrectly identify a single parcel of land along Route 97 as the "Redmond-Bend Juniper State Park" site. However, the property these online maps highlight is in fact private property that has nothing to do with the scenic corridor.
