= Valanginian =

Second age of the Early Cretaceous

- 137.05 ± 0.2 – 132.6 ± 0.6 Ma

Chronology
← / K-Pg mass extinction
Subdivision of the Cretaceous according to the ICS, as of 2024. Vertical axis scale: Millions of years ago

Etymology
- Name formality: Formal

Usage information
- Celestial body: Earth
- Regional usage: Global (ICS)
- Time scale(s) used: ICS Time Scale

Definition
- Chronological unit: Age
- Stratigraphic unit: Stage
- Time span formality: Formal
- Lower boundary definition: FAD of Thurmanniceras pertransiens (Ammonite)
- Lower boundary GSSP: Montbrun-les-Bains, Drôme, France; 44.2031°N 5.4175°E
- Lower GSSP ratified: December 2024
- Upper boundary definition: FAD of the Ammonite genus Acanthodiscus
- Upper boundary GSSP: La Charce, Drôme, France; 44.4694°N 5.4437°E
- Upper GSSP ratified: December 2019

In the geologic timescale, the Valanginian is an age or stage of the Early or Lower Cretaceous. It spans between 137.05 ± 0.2 Ma and 132.6 ± 0.2 Ma (million years ago). The Valanginian Stage succeeds the Berriasian Stage of the Lower Cretaceous and precedes the Hauterivian Stage of the Lower Cretaceous.

== Stratigraphic definitions ==
The Valanginian was first described and named by Édouard Desor in 1853. It is named after Valangin, a small town north of Neuchâtel in the Jura Mountains of Switzerland.

The base of the Valanginian is at the first appearance of ammonite species Thurmanniceras pertransiens, with a global reference section (a GSSP) appointed in December 2024.

The top of the Valanginian (the base of the Hauterivian) is at the first appearance of the ammonite genus Acanthodiscus.

=== Subdivision ===
The Valanginian is often subdivided in Lower and Upper substages. The Upper substage begins at the first appearance of ammonite species Saynoceras verrucosum and the major marine transgression Va3.

In the Tethys domain, the Valanginian stage contains five ammonite biozones:

- zone of Criosarasinella furcillata
- zone of Neocomites peregrinus
- zone of Saynoceras verrucosum
- zone of Busnardoites campylotoxus
- zone of Tirnovella pertransiens

== Climate ==
The Valanginian saw several episodes of significant environmental changes. The potential causes of these changes came from the formation and volcanic activity from the Paraná-Etendeka traps, large igneous provinces (LIPs) located in South America and Africa. The main difficulty of confirming the cause of these environmental changes and the role of volcanism is due to difficulties in dating when things occurred. The volcanism that occurred released large amounts of mercury into the atmosphere which disrupted the carbon cycle, disrupting ratios of mercury compared to iron, organic matter and phyllosilicates. It also enriched the surrounding sediments. The highest periods of mercury enrichment was during the Weissert episode, a sudden warming of the planet where humidity was high.

The effect that the eruptions had on the biosphere of Earth had different effects with marine life most severely impacted. The increase weatherability of basalts produced from large igneous provinces enhanced global silicate weathering causing nutrient runoff into the oceans. The terrestrial ecosystem were less severely impacts and even potentially benefited from the eruptions. The warm and humid conditions brought by the traps lead to the development of widespread vegetation covers. This allowed for the evolution of herbivorous life and brought favorable conditions for the evolution of flowering plants.
