= Snowshoe Formation =

Geologic formation Oregon, United States

- Stratigraphic range: Toarcian-Bathonian; ~180–164 Ma
- Type: Formation
- Sub-units: South Fork, Warm Springs, Basey, Schoolhouse, Silvies & Weberg members

Lithology
- Primary: Mudstone, limestone
- Other: Sandstone

Location
- Coordinates: 44.0°N 119.4°W
- Approximate paleocoordinates: 33.8°N 58.5°W
- Region: Oregon
- Country: United States
- Extent: Snake River Basin
- Snowshoe Formation (the United States) Snowshoe Formation (Oregon)

The Snowshoe Formation is a geologic formation in Oregon. It preserves fossils dating back to the Toarcian to Bathonian stages of the Early to Middle Jurassic period.

== Fossil content ==
Among others, the following fossils have been reported from the formation:

- Loricata
  - Zoneait nargorum

== See also ==
- List of fossiliferous stratigraphic units in Oregon
- Paleontology in Oregon
- Hyde Formation
- Posidonia Shale
