= Yaquina Formation =

Geologic formation in Oregon, U.S.

Coordinates: 44.721°N 124.004°W

- Stratigraphic range: Chattian
- Type: Geological formation

Location
- Region: Lincoln County, Oregon
- Country: United States

Type section
- Named for: Yaquina Head

The Yaquina Formation is a geologic formation in Oregon. It preserves fossils dating back to the Paleogene period.

== Fossil content ==
=== Mammals ===
==== Carnivorans ====
Carnivorans reported from the Yaquina Formation
Genus	Species	Presence	Material	Notes	Images
Enaliarctos	E. barnesi	South of Beaver Creek, Lincoln County, Oregon.	USNM 314295 (anterior half of cranium and associated mandibular rami).	A pinnipedimorph.	
Enaliarctos	E. sp., cf. E tedfordi	Ona Beach, Lincoln County, Oregon.	UCMP 253400 (associated right mandible, thoracic vertebra & 2 ribs).	A pinnipedimorph.	

==== Cetaceans ====
Cetaceans reported from the Yaquina Formation
Genus	Species	Presence	Material	Notes	Images
Aetiocetus	A. cotylaveus	Lincoln County, Oregon.		An aetiocetid whale.	
Aetiocetus	A. weltoni	Ona Beach, Lincoln County, Oregon.	UCMP 122900.	An aetiocetid whale.	

==== Desmostylians ====
Desmostylians reported from the Yaquina Formation
Genus	Species	Presence	Material	Notes	Images
Behemotops	B. emlongi	Seal Rock State Wayside, Lincoln County, Oregon.	USNM 244033 & 186889.		
Cornwallius	C. sookensis		"2 skulls, 4 partial mandibles, 4 isolated teeth, an innominate & a tibia".	A desmostylid.	

=== Fish ===
==== Bony fish ====
Bony fish reported from the Yaquina Formation
Genus	Species	Presence	Material	Notes	Images
Paleobathygadus	P. yaguinensis	Southwest edge of Waldport.	A scale.	A bathygadid also known from the Toledo Formation.	
Promacrurus	P. alseanus	South side of Alsea Bay.	A scale.	A macrourid.	
Promacrurus	P. oregonensis	Southwest edge of Walport.	Scales.	A macrourid.	
Pyknolepidus	P. macrospinosus	South side of Alsea Bay.	A scale.	A macrourid.	

==== Sharks ====
Sharks reported from the Yaquina Formation
Genus	Species	Presence	Material	Notes	Images
Megachasma	M. applegatei	Upper member, Ona Beach State Park, Lincoln County, Oregon.	2 teeth (LACM 122120 and 122121).	A megamouth shark also known from the Jewett Sand, Skooner Gulch & Nye Mudstone formations.	

== See also ==
- List of fossiliferous stratigraphic units in Oregon
- Paleontology in Oregon

== Sources ==
- Various Contributors to the Paleobiology Database. "Fossilworks: Gateway to the Paleobiology Database". Archived from the original on 19 August 2022.
