= Vester Formation =

Geologic formation in Oregon, United States

- Stratigraphic range: Ladinian - Norian
- Type: Formation
- Unit of: Olds Ferry Terrane
- Sub-units: Brisbois Member
- Area: Central Oregon

Location
- Coordinates: 44.118° N, 119.483° W
- Region: Oregon
- Country: United States

The Vester Formation is a geologic formation in Oregon which preserves fossils dating back to the Triassic period. The partial skeleton of a new genus of basal thalattosaur has been recovered from the Brisbois Member of this formation. The Brisbois Member, which dates to between the Carnian and Norian, is a marine sequence primarily composed of fine-grained clastic sedimentary rocks with fissile mudstones of black, green or gray variety broken up by widely spaced intervals of calcirudite beds and calcareous conglomerate. The formation formed between two parallel island arcs, that of the Baker Terrane and the Olds Ferry Terrane. The formation mostly consists of reworked chert grains from the Baker Terrane. In addition to the remains of the basal thalattosaur, fragmentary and undescribed remains exist of an ichthyosaur, archosaur, and a hybodontid shark as well as many invertebrate fossils.

== See also ==
- List of fossiliferous stratigraphic units in Oregon
- Paleontology in Oregon

== Sources ==
- Various Contributors to the Paleobiology Database. "Fossilworks: Gateway to the Paleobiology Database". Archived from the original on 19 August 2022.
