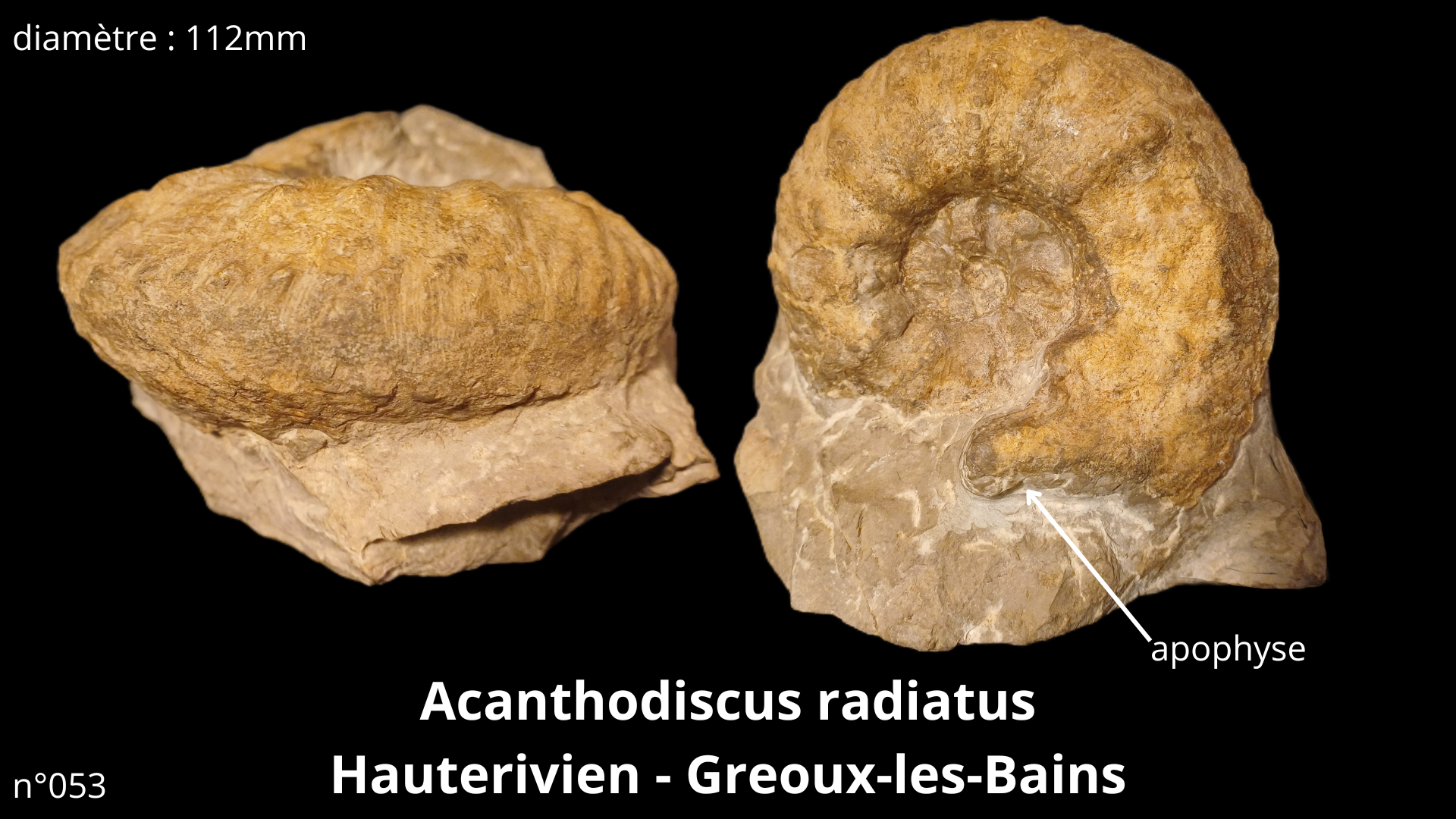
- Acanthodiscus radiatus

Scientific classification
- Kingdom: Animalia
- Phylum: Mollusca
- Class: Cephalopoda
- Subclass: †Ammonoidea
- Order: †Ammonitida
- Family: †Neocomitidae
- Subfamily: †Berriasellinae
- Genus: †Acanthodiscus; Uhlig 1905

Type species
- Acanthodiscus radiatus

Species
- A. magnificus Imlay 1938; A. marocanus; A. octagonus; A. ottmeri; A. radiatus Bruguiére 1792; A. rollieri; A. schmidtii; A. subradiatus Uhlig 1910

= Acanthodiscus =

Acanthodiscus Temporal range: Hauterivian ~133–130 Ma

Genus of molluscs (fossil)

Acanthodiscus is an extinct ammonoid cephalopod genus from the order Ammonitida and included in the persphinctacean family Berriasellidae. The type species, named by Bruguière, 1792, is Acanthodiscus radiatus.

== Description ==
The shell of Acanthodiscus (A. radiatus) is of modest size, slightly more than 14 centimetres (5.5 in) in diameter, coiled with the outer whorl covering about a third of the next inner whorl. The lower (2/3) flanks bear strong, wide spaced, radial ribs with large nodes at either end, and become weaker on the mature body chamber. Outer flanks (approx. 1/3) slope toward a narrow, flat to concave venter lined on either side by a series of smaller nodes. the mature whorl section is higher than wide.

== Biostratigraphic significance ==
Acanthodiscus is found in shallow water sediments in both the Tethyan and Boreal realms where it is used as an index fossil. In fact, the International Commission on Stratigraphy (ICS) has assigned the First Appearance Datum of Acanthodiscus radiatus, the first species of the genus, as the defining biological marker for the start of the Hauterivian stage of the Cretaceous, ~132.9 million years ago.

== Species ==
- A. radiatus; type species
- A. marocanus
- A. octagonus
- A. ottmeri
- A. rollieri
- A. schmidtii; Found on the Antarctic Peninsula
- A. subradiatus

== Distribution ==
Acanthodiscus fossils can be found in the Agrio Formation of the Neuquén Basin, Argentina. Also in the Macanal Formation of the Eastern Ranges of the Colombian Andes, fossils of Acanthodiscus have been found.

Other occurrences of the genus are in:

- Abundancia Formation, Chile
- Guchuochun Formation, China
- Kaliste Formation, the Czech Republic
- France
- Giumal Sandstone Formation, India
- Chia Gara Formation, Iraq
- Sardinia, Italy
- Sabinal Formation and Barril Viejo Shale Member, Mexico
- Myrtle Formation, Oregon, United States
