= Elk River Formation =

Geologic formation in Oregon, United States

- Type: Formation
- Overlies: Port Orford Formation

Location
- Region: Oregon
- Country: United States

The Elk River Formation is a geologic formation in Oregon. It preserves fossils. It consists of terrace deposits overlying the Port Orford Formation.

== See also ==
- List of fossiliferous stratigraphic units in Oregon
- Paleontology in Oregon

== Bibliography ==
- Various Contributors to the Paleobiology Database. "Fossilworks: Gateway to the Paleobiology Database". Archived from the original on 25 March 2022.
