= Simocetus =

Simocetus Temporal range: Oligocene

Scientific classification
- Domain: Eukaryota
- Kingdom: Animalia
- Phylum: Chordata
- Class: Mammalia
- Order: Artiodactyla
- Infraorder: Cetacea
- Family: †Simocetidae
- Genus: †Simocetus; Fordyce, 2002

Type species
- †S. rayi, Fordyce, 2002

Species
- †S. rayi

Extinct genus of mammals

Simocetus (from simus, "pug-nosed", and cetus, "whale") is an extinct genus of toothed whale that lived during the Oligocene period, approximately 32 million years ago, making it the oldest named toothed whale, although older unnamed toothed whales exist.

Simocetus is known from a single fossil, a skull, found in marine siltstone deposits of the Alsea Formation on the banks of Oregon's Yaquina River in 1977 by fossil hunter of the region, Douglas Emlong. It was first named by New Zealand paleontologist Ewan Fordyce in 2002 and contains a single species, S. rayi. He found its teeth and jaw different from any other known whale's, and thought it might have been a bottom feeder that fed by suction on marine invertebrates. Features of the basicranium and face suggest that Simocetus may have had comparable echolocation abilities to modern whales.
