= Nicely Formation =

- Stratigraphic range: late Pliensbachian; ~186–183 Ma
- Type: Formation

Lithology
- Primary: Mudstone, limestone
- Other: Shale, siltstone

Location
- Coordinates: 44.1°N 119.4°W
- Approximate paleocoordinates: 28.4°N 56.1°W
- Region: Crook, Grant & Harney Counties, Oregon
- Country: United States
- Extent: Snake River Basin
- Nicely Formation (the United States) Nicely Formation (Oregon)

The Nicely Formation is a geologic formation in the Crook, Grant, and Harney Counties in Oregon. It preserves radiolaria and ichthyosaur fossils dating back to the Pliensbachian stage of the Early Jurassic period.

== Fossil content ==
Among others, the following fossils have been reported from the formation:

- Ichthyosauria indet.

== See also ==
- List of fossiliferous stratigraphic units in Oregon
- Paleontology in Oregon
