= Coaledo Formation =

Geologic formation in Oregon, United States

- Stratigraphic range: Paleogene
- Type: Formation

Location
- Coordinates: 43.322°N 124.370°W
- Region: Coos County, Oregon, Oregon
- Country: United States

The Coaledo Formation is a geologic formation in Oregon. It preserves fossils dating back to the Paleogene period.

== See also ==
- List of fossiliferous stratigraphic units in Oregon
- Paleontology in Oregon
