= Empire Formation =

Geologic formation in Oregon, United States

- Stratigraphic range: Neogene
- Type: Formation
- Underlies: Port Orford Formation

Location
- Region: Oregon
- Country: United States

The Empire Formation is a geologic formation in Oregon. It preserves fossils dating back to the Neogene period. It underlies the Port Orford Formation.

== See also ==
- List of fossiliferous stratigraphic units in Oregon
- Paleontology in Oregon

== Bibliography ==
- Various Contributors to the Paleobiology Database. "Fossilworks: Gateway to the Paleobiology Database". Archived from the original on 19 August 2022.
