= Dothan Formation =

Geologic formation in Oregon, United States

- Stratigraphic range: Cretaceous
- Type: Formation

Location
- Region: Oregon
- Country: United States

The Dothan Formation is a geologic formation consisting mostly of lithic greywacke (sandstone), but also including chert, mudstone, greensand formed from volcanic pillow lava, and to a minor degree, granitic cobble. It preserves fossils dating between the Late Cretaceous to the Late Jurassic period. It occurs along the Oregon coast in Curry county. It ranges approximately 12 miles from Winchuck River just north of the state line of California to Whalehead Cove to the north, and inward to the southern area of the city of Roseburg.

== See also ==
- List of fossiliferous stratigraphic units in Oregon
- Paleontology in Oregon
