= Mowich Group =

Geologic group in Oregon

- Stratigraphic range: Jurassic
- Type: Group

Location
- Region: Oregon
- Country: United States

The Mowich Group is a geologic group in Oregon. It preserves fossils dating back to the Jurassic period.

== See also ==
- List of fossiliferous stratigraphic units in Oregon
- Paleontology in Oregon
