= Butte Creek Formation =

Geologic formation in Oregon, United States

- Stratigraphic range: Neogene
- Type: Formation

Location
- Coordinates: 44.2764°N 118.2353°W
- Region: Oregon
- Country: United States

The Butte Creek Formation is a geologic formation in Oregon. It preserves fossils dating back to the Neogene period.

== See also ==
- List of fossiliferous stratigraphic units in Oregon
- Paleontology in Oregon
