= Scotts Mills Formation =

Geologic formation in Oregon

- Stratigraphic range: Paleogene
- Type: Formation

Location
- Region: Oregon
- Country: United States

The Scotts Mills Formation is a geologic formation in Oregon. It preserves fossils dating back to the Paleogene period.

== See also ==
- List of fossiliferous stratigraphic units in Oregon
- Paleontology in Oregon
