= Hyde Formation =

Geologic formation in Oregon, United States

- Stratigraphic range: Toarcian
- Type: Formation

Location
- Region: Oregon
- Country: United States

The Hyde Formation is a geologic formation in central-eastern Oregon which preserves fossils dating back to the Jurassic period.

== See also ==
- List of fossiliferous stratigraphic units in Oregon
- Paleontology in Oregon
- Snowshoe Formation
- Posidonia Shale
