= Port Orford Formation =

Geologic formation in Oregon, United States

- Type: Formation
- Underlies: Elk River Formation
- Overlies: Empire Formation

Lithology
- Primary: Sand, Conglomerate

Location
- Region: Oregon
- Country: United States

The Port Orford Formation is a geologic formation in Oregon. It preserves fossils. It consists of beds lying unconformably between the Empire Formation and overlying terrace deposits. The formation is composed of a basal bed of buff (yellow-brown) sand, overlain by a layer of conglomerate, and layer of rusty sand grading upward into blue-gray argillaceous sand, which is then truncated by the sea, on top of which are the Elk River Beds. The name was proposed by Ewart M. Baldwin in 1945.

== See also ==
- List of fossiliferous stratigraphic units in Oregon
- Paleontology in Oregon

== Bibliography ==
- Various Contributors to the Paleobiology Database. "Fossilworks: Gateway to the Paleobiology Database".
