= Alsea Formation =

Geologic formation in Oregon, United States

- Stratigraphic range: Rupelian (Whitneyan); ~33.7–30.6 Ma
- Type: Formation
- Underlies: Yaquina Formation

Lithology
- Primary: Siltstone
- Other: Mudstone

Location
- Coordinates: 44.6°N 124.0°W
- Approximate paleocoordinates: 44.3°N 113.1°W
- Region: Lincoln County, Oregon
- Country: United States
- Alsea Formation (the United States) Alsea Formation (Oregon)

The Alsea Formation is a geologic formation in Oregon. It preserves fossils dating back to the Rupelian stage of the Oligocene period.

== Fossil content ==
The following fossils have been reported from the formation:

=== Mammals ===
- Aetiocetus cotylalveus
- Maiabalaena nesbittae
- Simocetus rayi

=== Fish ===
- Orthechinorhinus davidae

== See also ==
- List of fossiliferous stratigraphic units in Oregon
- Paleontology in Oregon
