= Cape Sebastian Sandstone =

Geologic formation in Oregon, US

- Stratigraphic range: Campanian, 83.6–72.1 Ma
- Type: Geological formation

Location
- Region: Oregon

The Cape Sebastian Sandstone is a Mesozoic geologic formation in the state of Oregon in the United States. Hadrosaurid dinosaur remains, such as the sacrum of the Cape Sebastian ornithopod (described in 2019), are among the fossils that have been recovered from the formation, although none have yet been referred to a specific genus. The formation dates to the Campanian stage of the Late Cretaceous epoch.

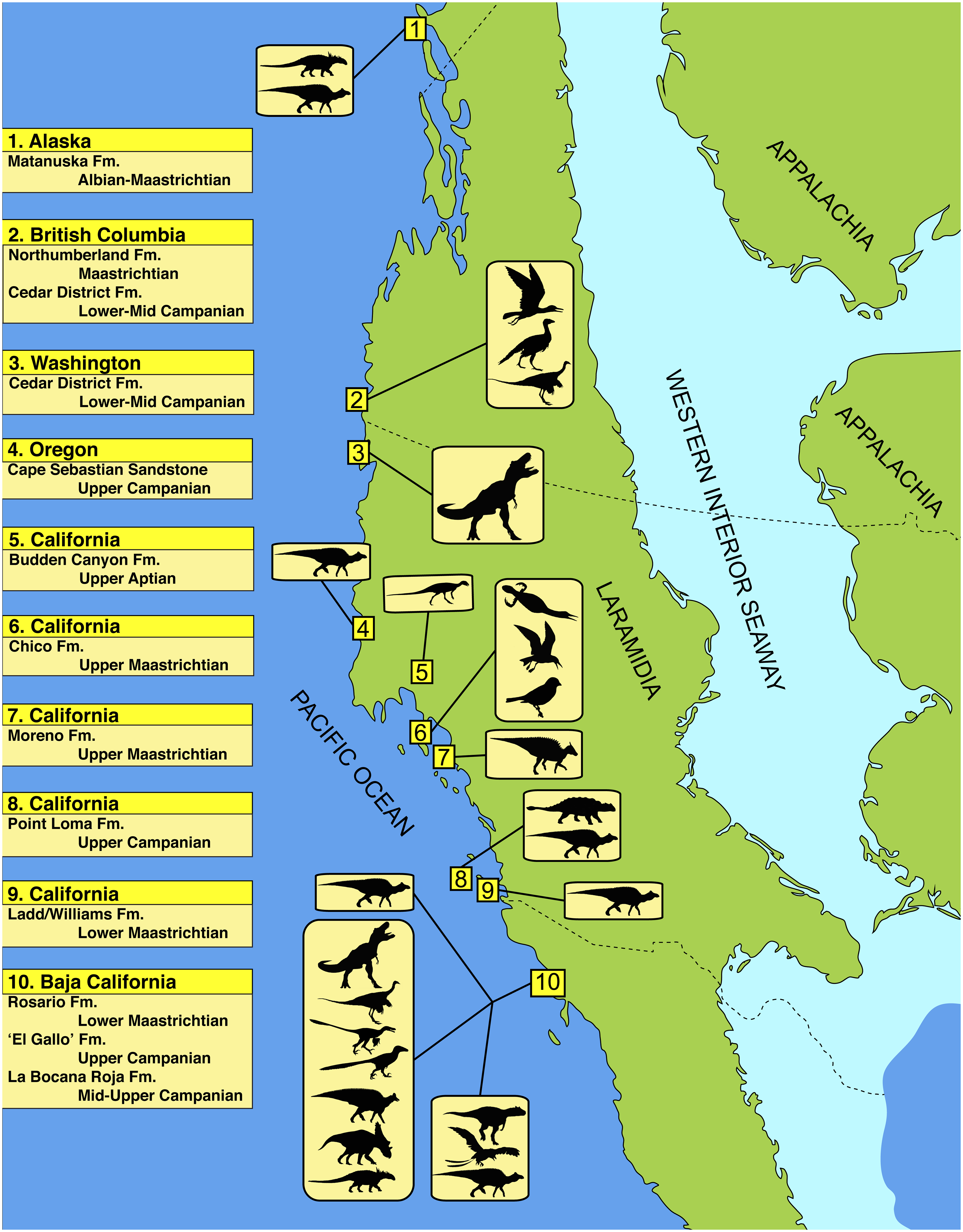
Dinosaurs found on the western coast, 4 being the formation

== See also ==
- List of dinosaur-bearing rock formations
  - List of stratigraphic units with indeterminate dinosaur fossils
