= Myrtle Group =

Geologic group in Oregon, U.S.

- Stratigraphic range: Cretaceous
- Type: Group

Location
- Region: Oregon
- Country: United States

The Myrtle Group is a geologic group in Oregon. It preserves fossils dating back to the Cretaceous period.

== See also ==
- List of fossiliferous stratigraphic units in Oregon
- Paleontology in Oregon
