= Dalles Formation =

Geologic formation in Oregon, United States

Coordinates: 45.408°N 121.336°W

- Stratigraphic range: Neogene (Miocene to possibly early Pliocene)
- Type: Formation
- Unit of: Columbia River Basin
- Sub-units: Informal lower coarse conglomeratic beds; upper finer tuffaceous sandstone and siltstone
- Underlies: Local surficial deposits (Quaternary alluvium and terrace gravels)
- Overlies: Columbia River Basalt Group (Yakima Basalt)
- Thickness: Variable; locally several hundred feet (rapid lateral variation reported)

Lithology
- Primary: sandstone, siltstone, conglomerate
- Other: tuff, tuffaceous sandstone, volcanic breccia, clayey volcanic detritus

Location
- Region: Wasco County, Oregon
- Country: United States
- Extent: Intermontane Belt and valley margins near The Dalles

Type section
- Named for: The Dalles
- Named by: Arthur M. Piper (1932)

The Dalles Formation is a geologic formation in Oregon, mapped in the vicinity of The Dalles and adjacent Columbia River region. It consists chiefly of weakly consolidated Miocene to lower Pliocene fluvial and volcaniclastic deposits that overlie the Columbia River Basalt Group.

The formation is composed of interbedded sandstone, shale, conglomerate, and tuffaceous materials derived from both stream deposition and volcanic activity. Local coarse conglomeratic zones contain angular volcanic fragments, while finer tuffaceous sandstones and silts are more widespread but discontinuous. The formation also preserves Neogene fossil material consistent with its (Miocene–Pliocene) age assignment.

== See also ==
- List of fossiliferous stratigraphic units in Oregon
- Paleontology in Oregon
