= Basirepomys =

Basirepomys Temporal range: Late Miocene

Scientific classification
- Domain: Eukaryota
- Kingdom: Animalia
- Phylum: Chordata
- Class: Mammalia
- Order: Rodentia
- Family: Cricetidae
- Genus: †Basirepomys; Korth & De Blieux, 2010

Type species
- Peromyscus pliocenicus Wilson 1937

Species
- Basirepomys pliocenicus (Wilson, 1937); Basirepomys robertsi Korth & De Blieux, 2010; Basirepomys romensis Korth 2011

Extinct genus of rodents

Basirepomys is an extinct genus of Cricetidae that existed in the United States during the Late Miocene period. It contains the species B. pliocenicus and B. robertsi.
