= Brian Booth State Park =

State park in Oregon, United States

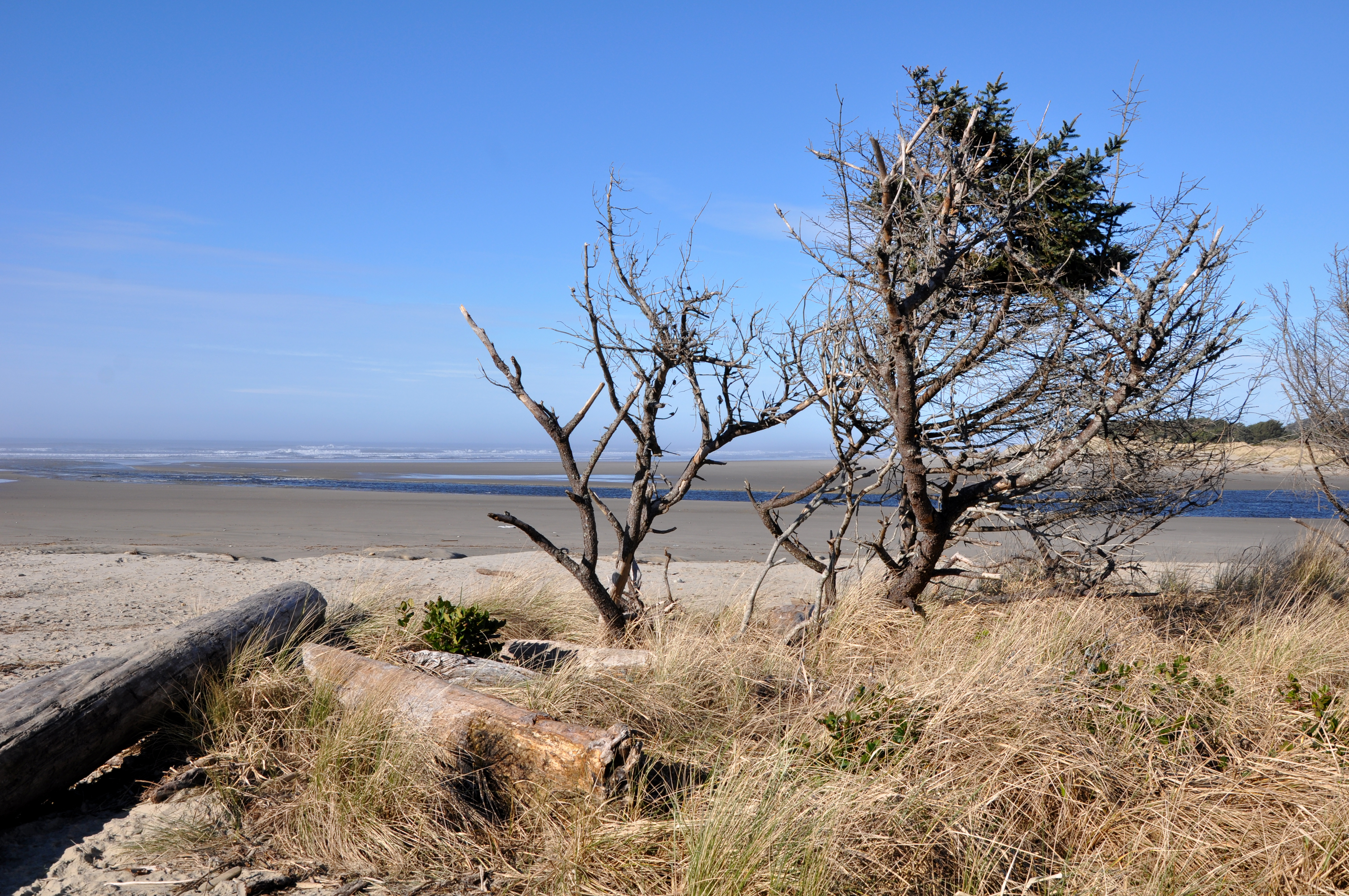
- Edge of the beach

- Location within Oregon Location within the United States
- Interactive map of Brian Booth State Park
- Type: Public, state
- Location: Lincoln County, Oregon, U.S.
- Nearest city: Seal Rock
- Coordinates: 44.5184518°N 124.0726195°W
- Operator: Oregon State Parks and Recreation

Brian Booth State Park is a coastal recreational area located near Seal Rock, Lincoln County, Oregon United States, administered by the Oregon Parks and Recreation Department. It consists of two major portions: Ona Beach State Park and Beaver Creek State Natural Area, which were merged in 2013. The park has beach access, kayaking, and hiking trails. The park is 886.32 acres and has an annual attendance of 247,772 people. Ona is known as a Chinook Jargon word for razor clam.

Ona Beach State Park is a state park, which straddles Beaver Creek. It approximately halfway between Newport and Waldport, Oregon, which is 9 miles (14 km) south of the former.

Beaver Creek State Natural Area opened to the public on October 1, 2010.

The state park is also the western terminus of the Corvallis to the Sea Trail, which has its official opening August 21, 2021.

== History ==
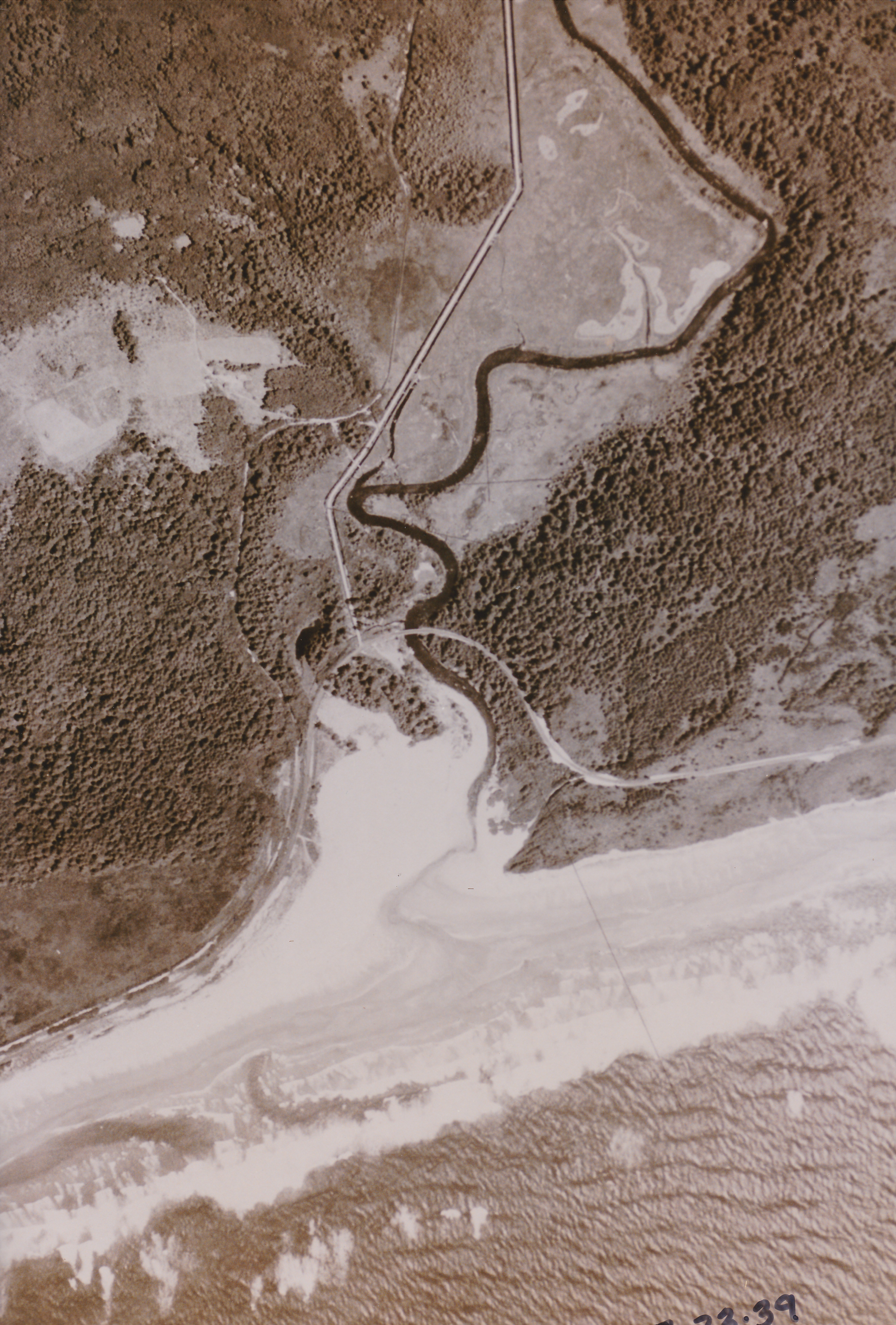
Aerial photograph of Ona Beach in 1938

The land was purchased between 1938 and 1968 from private owners, and includes one gift of 10 acres from Lincoln County, Oregon made in 1963. In the days before the completion of the Coast Highway, the beach between Newport and Seal Rock was used as an access road. Motorists would travel at low tide, following the mail carrier who knew the best way to cross Beaver Creek. The park was first known as Ona Beach State Park, but was renamed in 2013 to honor the first Oregon State Parks and Recreation Commission chairperson Brian Booth (c. 1937–March 2012).

== See also ==
- List of Oregon state parks
