= Hemphillian =

North American faunal stage according to the North American Land Mammal Ages chronology

The Hemphillian North American Stage on the geologic timescale is a North American faunal stage according to the North American Land Mammal Ages chronology (NALMA), typically set from 10,300,000 to 4,900,000 years BP. It is usually considered to overlap the Tortonian age of the Late Miocene and Zanclean age of the Early Pliocene. The Hemphillian is preceded by the Clarendonian and followed by the Blancan NALMA stages.

The Hemphillian can be further divided into the substages of:

- Late/Upper Hemphillian: Lower boundary source of the base of the Hemphillian (approximate).
- late Early Hemphillian: Lower boundary source of the base of the Hemphillian (approximate). Upper boundary source: base of Blancan (approximate).
- early Early Hemphillian: Upper boundary source: base of Blancan (approximate).
