= Rocky Butte =

Extinct cinder cone butte in Portland, Oregon

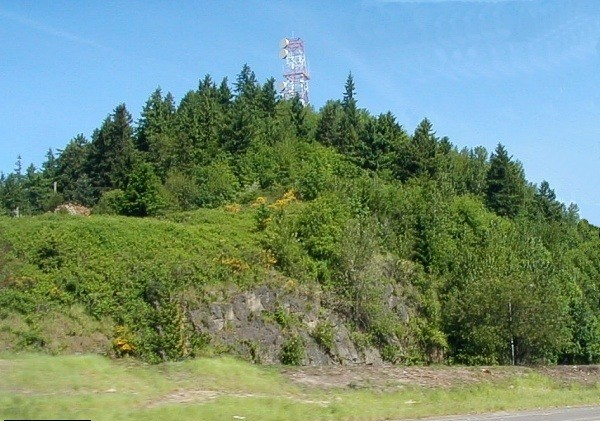
- Rocky Butte looking northwest from Interstate 205 in 2003

Highest point
- Elevation: 613 ft (187 m) NAVD 88
- Coordinates: 45°32′48″N 122°33′57″W

Geography
- Location: Multnomah County, Oregon, U.S.
- Topo map: USGS Mount Tabor

Geology
- Volcanic field: Boring Lava Field
- Rocky Butte Scenic Drive Historic District
- U.S. National Register of Historic Places
- U.S. Historic district
- Location within Oregon Location within the United States
- Location: Rocky Butte Rd. and parts of NE Fremont St. and 92nd Ave., Portland, Oregon, U.S.
- Area: 21.5 acres (8.7 ha)
- Built: 1933
- Built by: Multnomah Co. Road Dept.
- NRHP reference No.: 91001550
- Added to NRHP: October 17, 1991

Rocky Butte (previously known as Mowich Illahee and Wiberg Butte) is an extinct cinder cone butte in Portland, Oregon, United States. It is also part of the Boring Lava Field, a group of volcanic vents and lava flows throughout Oregon and Washington state. The volcano erupted between 285,000 and 500,000 years ago.

As part of the Boring Lava Field, Rocky Butte is considered an outlier of the Cascade Range. It was produced by the subduction of the oceanic Juan de Fuca tectonic plate under the North American tectonic plate; it is the core remnant of intrusive rock from kilate Pleistocene volcano. The butte has a calc-alkaline composition and consists of basaltic andesite with olivine phenocrysts.

Historically, the butte was the home of the Rocky Butte Jail, Judson Baptist College, and Hill Military Academy, as well as an extensive Works Progress Administration construction project, Portland Bible College and a campus for the City Bible Church; at the summit of Rocky Butte there is a still functioning but decommissioned rotating airway beacon. The slopes of the butte currently support Joseph Wood Hill Park and the Rocky Butte Natural Area, which includes a wide variety of flora and fauna and supports rich forest stands. Located adjacent to Interstate 205, the butte is a popular destination for hiking, climbing, and viewing mountains from its summit viewpoint.

== Geography ==
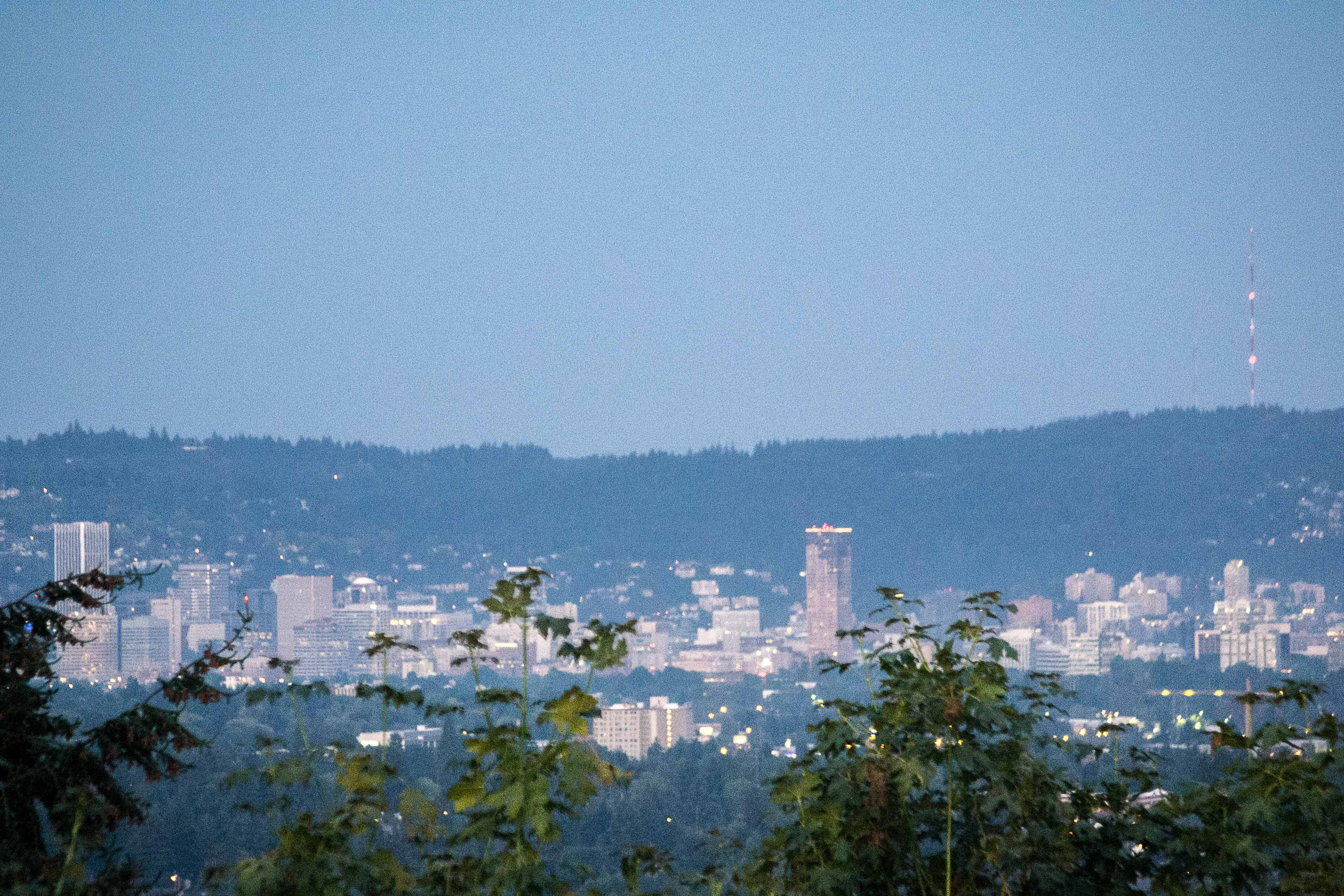
Downtown Portland as seen from Rocky Butte

Rocky Butte lies in the northeast part of Portland within the city limits, in Multnomah County, part of the U. S. state of Oregon. It is one of the few smaller volcanic cones within or near Portland, along with Mount Tabor, Kelly Butte, and Powell Butte. According to the U.S. National Geodetic Survey, Rocky Butte has an elevation of 613 feet (187 m). It is surrounded on almost all sides by the Portland Delta.

With a variable topography, the Portland area ranges from river valley floors to terraces reaching elevations of 400 feet (120 m). The Willamette Valley is separated within by hills reaching heights more than 1,000 feet (300 m), and it is also physically separated from the lower Columbia River valley. The Columbia River flows west from the eastern Portland region, merging with the Willamette near Portland before moving north. Tributaries for the Willamette include the Pudding, Molalla, Tualatin, Abernethy, and Clackamas Rivers, while the Washougal and Sandy Rivers mark notable tributaries for the Columbia River. The Columbia River has significantly shaped the geology of the area.

Portland's climate is moderate, with long growing seasons, moderate rainfail, mild winters, and warm, dry summer seasons. The area typically does not experience frost, with more than 200 frost-free days annually. Temperature can vary widely, reaching a historic maximum of 107 °F (42 °C), though the usual July maximum is below 80 °F (27 °C), and the average minimum for January is above 32 °F (0 °C). Yearly, precipitation averages between 35 and 45 inches (89 and 114 cm) in most river valleys, with a mean of 42.04 inches (106.8 cm) from 1871 through 1952. It shows variability, however, with a historic low of 26.11 inches (66.3 cm) at Portland in 1929 and a maximum of 67.24 inches (170.8 cm) in 1882. More than 75 percent of this precipitation occurs between October and March; July and August mark the driest months with means below 1 inch (2.5 cm), while November, December, and January represent the wettest with averages greater than 6 inches (15 cm). Prevailing winds originate from the south during winter and from the northwest during the summer season, with the exception of prevailing winds at the mouth of the Columbia River Gorge, where winds predominantly move to the east. The southern winds have the highest velocities of the three, only rarely occurring with potentially destructive force.

== Geology ==
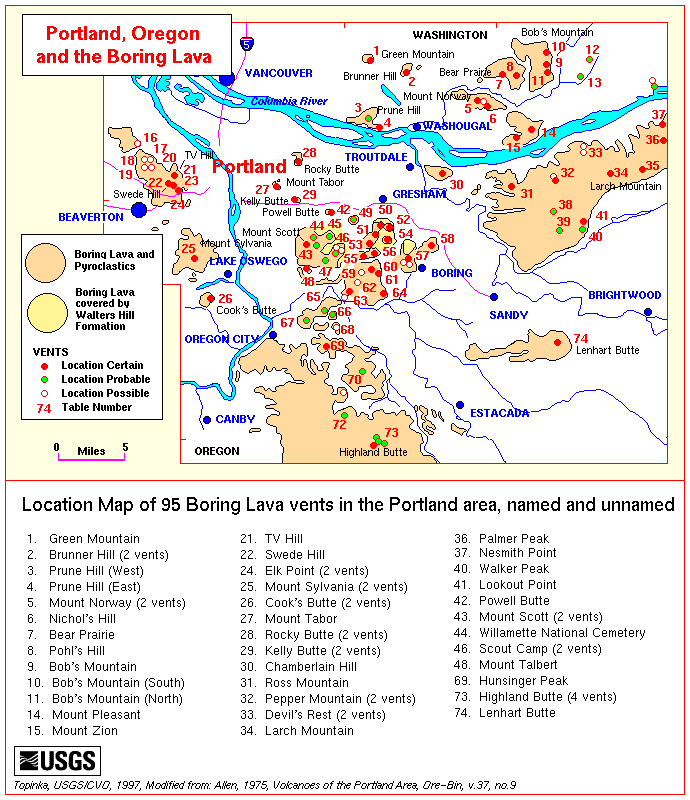
Locations of Boring vents in the Portland, Oregon area, with Rocky Butte on the upper left center

There are a number of volcanic centers within a 20 miles (32 km) radius of Troutdale and more than 32 vents within a 13 miles (21 km) radius of Kelly Butte. Mostly small cinder cone vents, these volcanoes also include some larger lava domes from shield volcanoes at Mount Sylvania, Highland Butte, and Larch Mountain. Known as the Boring Lava Field, this cluster includes more than 80 known small vents and associated lava flows, with more volcanic deposits likely present. The Global Volcanism Program reports that the field includes somewhere between 32 and 50 shield volcanoes and cinder cones, with many vents concentrated northwest of the town of Boring.

Considered an outlier of the Cascade Range, the Boring Lava Field lies about 62 miles (100 km) to the west of the major Cascade crest. It marks one of five volcanic fields along the Quaternary Cascade arc, along with Indian Heaven, Tumalo in Oregon, the Mount Bachelor chain, and Caribou in California. Like the Cascade Range, the Boring field was also generated by the subduction of the oceanic Juan de Fuca tectonic plate under the North American tectonic plate, but it has a different tectonic position, with its eruptive activity more likely related to tectonic rifting throughout the region. The Boring Lava Field has erupted material derived from hot mantle magma, and the subducting Juan de Fuca plate may be as shallow as 50 miles (80 km) in depth at their location.

Many volcanic features in the Portland Basin area were destroyed by the Missoula Floods (also known as the Bretz or Ice Age Floods), which took place between 21,000 and 15,000 years ago and probably destroyed small cinder cones (including those made from tuff) and maar craters, burying them under up to 98 feet (30 m) of silt from slack water. Volcanic vents with either extensive eruptions of lava flows or volcanic plugs that filled their vents survived, including Rocky Butte, Prune Hill, and Beacon Rock. However, the upstream side of Rocky Butte was heavily eroded by the flooding.

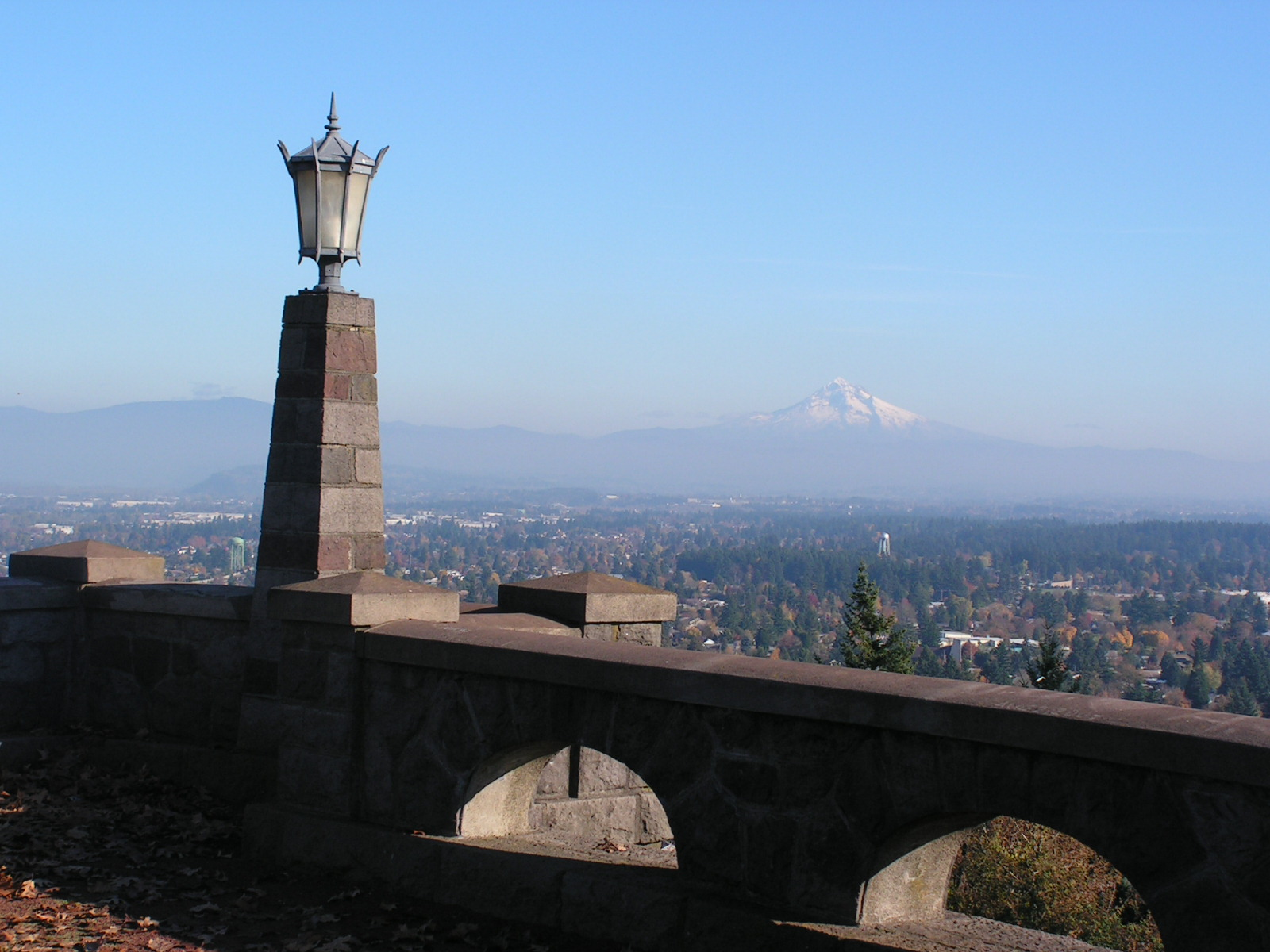
Mount Hood (background) from Rocky Butte

Rocky Butte is a prominent, but isolated hill, with two volcanic vents. It is the core remnant of intrusive rock from a heavily eroded, late Pleistocene volcano that erupted basaltic andesite. Like many other vents in the Boring Lava Field, Rocky Butte consists of basaltic andesite with olivine phenocrysts, and it has a calc-alkalic composition. This basaltic andesite can be observed in exposures that extend from its summit park area to the roads below, as well as in a sill (a sheet of intrusive rock wedged between older layers of sedimentary rock, beds of volcanic lava, or tuff, or along the direction of layering in metamorphic rock) between layers of fluvial gravel from the Troutdale Formation on the Butte's eastern slope, within a flow scarp. Vug cavities were identified from rock in the historic quarry on the eastern side of Rocky Butte by scientists from the United States Geological Survey, including optically positive hornblende (also known as pargasite) with a pale brown color. They exhibit prismatic cleavage and extend for a few millimeters in length. Other minerals identified were dark green, pyroxene crystals with 70 percent hedenbergite and 30 percent diopside; white aggregates of tridymite; brown, granular olivine crystals with 80 percent forsterite and 20 percent fayalite; and tiny black, hexagonal plates of hematite with beveled edges. These minerals constitute a rare combination, and Trimble (1963) was unable to explain why free silica tridymite would be found together with low silica olivine.

The hill descends to meet the floodplain of the Columbia River, and at lower elevations, the mountain has cliffs on its northern and eastern sides. At the foot of Rocky Butte, there is a fosse (a ditch), which extends for 1 mile (1.6 km) before it opens toward the Columbia River to the north and divides to the south into two arms that run west and southwest. This depression has a width of less than 0.5 miles (0.80 km) and an average depth between 20 and 25 feet (6.1 and 7.6 m). There is another terrace, with a height of 250 feet (76 m), which sits next to Rocky Butte. It runs for 9 miles (14 km) to the west, with a descent of 150 feet (46 m) over that distance. To the south, this terrace also has a long depression near its base, which extends for 1.5 miles (2.4 km) from Rocky Butte. These features are likely the product of more than just erosional forces; Bretz (1925) argued that the fosse resulted from fluid eddies that pushed downward where currents interacted with the eastern side of Rocky Butte, and the terrace formed from accumulation of deposits in water under the blockage.

=== Eruptive history ===
Evarts et al. (2009) assign Rocky Butte an age younger than 500,000 years. One Argon–argon dating experiment determined an age for Rocky Butte lava of 285,000 years ± 16,000 years ago, which matches the normal magnetic polarity for the lava deposits at the Butte. There is a magnetic anomaly about 2.5 miles (4 km) northwest from Rocky Butte in Portland, but it is unlikely to be associated with the volcano or the Boring Lava Field in general. Local newspaper sources report that Rocky Butte is extinct.

Trimble (1963) noted that an eruption at Rocky Butte covered a hill composed of Troutdale Formation rocks, which are exposed as conglomerate rock at a height of 500 feet (150 m) on Rocky Butte's western slope. The exposure of rock from the Troutdale Formation suggests that Rocky Butte erupted onto a topographically irregular surface and that this surface later underwent erosion.

== Ecology ==
The moderate climate and ample precipitation of the region lead to rapid regrowth of vegetation on untended sites, which can hamper fieldwork in the area. Many forests that covered the area were partly cleared for agriculture, timber, or burials in the early 20th century. These cleared and burned land plots sustain rich stands of secondary forest, featuring gorse, huckleberry, nettles, poison oak, salal, and blackberry. Myriad species of fern, as well as rapid-growth deciduous trees like alder and vine maple are also frequent. Forests support stands of Douglas fir, western hemlock, western redcedar, Pacific dogwood, bigleaf maple, Oregon ash, red alder, cascara buckthorn, Pacific madrone, and Oregon white oak; within swamps and moist areas in creeks, the shrub Devil's club can be observed. Other trees that sometimes dominate forest areas include black cottonwood. Forest communities have many additional shrubs including Indian plum, western hazel, and snowberry. Ground layer plants include the herbaceous sword fern and stinging nettle.

In contemporary times, clearing of forests for housing development has left about half of the Boring Lava region still forested. As a result, water quality has decreased due to higher sedimentation and turbidity, and flooding has gotten worse over time. Streams within the area are of either first or second order, with moderate to low flows and average gradients between 10 and 12 percent. Cool and clear, many sustain macroinvertebrates, and a smaller number support amphibians and fish. The Riparian zones in the Lava Field area host diverse species, and they are influenced by uplands that serve as migration connections for birds, mammals, reptiles, and some amphibians. Gravel bars extend to the west from Rocky Butte, creating barriers for a lowland marsh.

The United States Fish and Wildlife Service provided a list of potentially threatened or endangered species in the Boring Lava area, calling them "sensitive" species. Among plant species, they determined the following species to be sensitive: white top aster, golden Indian paintbrush, tall bugbane, pale larkspur, peacock larkspur, Willamette daisy, water howellia, Bradshaw's lomatium, Kincaid's lupine, Howell's montia, Nelson's checkermallow, and Oregon sullivantia. For animal and marine life, northwestern pond turtles, Willow flycatchers, long-eared myotises, fringed myotises, long-legged myotises, Yuma myotises, Pacific western big-eared bats, and northern red-legged frogs have been identified as species of concern; pileated woodpeckers, bald eagles, cutthroat trout, and coho salmon are also considered sensitive.

== Human history ==
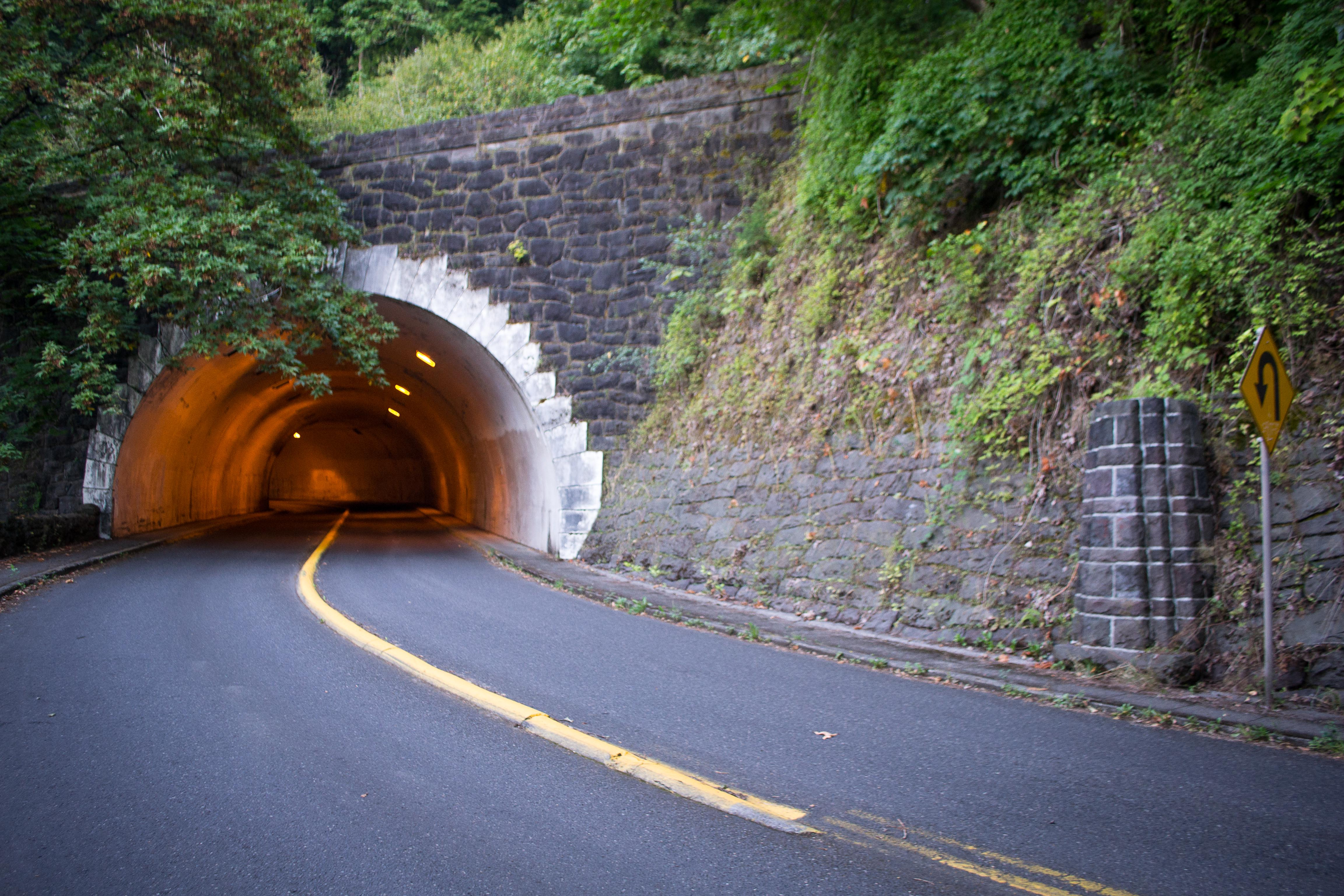
The Rocky Butte Tunnel

Mowitch Illihee, 'home of the deer', was the traditional hunting grounds for indigenous peoples.

At the summit of Rocky Butte, a rotating airway beacon was erected in 1929; although the beacon is still lit, it was officially decommissioned in the late 1960s. During the 1930s, employees of the Works Progress Administration constructed a park at the summit, at an elevation of about 600 feet (180 m). Called Joseph Wood Hill Park, it was built when Rocky Butte was known as Wiberg Butte. Rock from Rocky Butte's eastern slopes was used for the Multnomah County jail building, and some were later used for renovation of the Historic Columbia River Highway. There is a communications tower on the southern end of the volcano.

The Rocky Butte jail, completed in 1947, served as the major facility for male prisoners in Multnomah County, with a courtyard and recreation field. According to Rubin (1973), the Rocky Butte jail housed 320 inmates, but Houston, Gibbons, and Jones (1988) claimed that it often exceeded this limit. The jail also had a library, which was established in 1967 and housed 3,000 volumes. In general, the jail was known for being the subject of multiple grand jury investigations for security concerns, dirty conditions, access to drugs, violence, lack of organized programming, and most notably, during the 1960s and 1970s for severe overcrowding. Further attempts to replace the Rocky Butte jail were motivated by a successful escape in 1981 and a gun smuggling incident that resulted in an officer being shot in 1982. The Multnomah County Detention Center (MCDC) was built in downtown Portland after Rocky Butte Jail was demolished in 1984 to make way for Interstate 205. The Rocky Butte Jail and MCDC participated in a study on prisons, which was published in 1988 in the journal Crime & Delinquency.

In 1934, the Rocky Butte Scenic Drive Historic District was established. Built as part of a Works Progress Administration project that supported 25,000 employees in Portland, it was designed by the Multnomah County Road Department, The drive reaches the summit of Rocky Butte to a viewpoint overlooking Portland. Workers used basalt from the Rocky Butte quarry to create retaining walls, and the finished project was designed to have a rustic style typical for public works projects of the time. WPA workers also built the park and a baroque staircase at the top of Rocky Butte, finishing construction in 1939. At its peak popularity in the 1940s, Rocky Butte had more than 4,000 cars visiting each day. Over time, the park had far fewer visitors and fell into disrepair. During the 1970s, the summit became a frequent site for teenage parties; excessive littering, graffiti and vandalism were commonplace. In the early 1990s, the Rocky Butte Preservation Society began cleaning up and restoring the park area and adding new amenities. Once 5.5 acres (0.022 km^{2}) of land were added and the Preservation Society took on an active maintenance role, the site was regraded, original plaques were reinstalled, and lawn areas, irrigation, red cinder walkways and additional trees, flowers, shrubs and grass were added to the park. The District was listed on the National Register of Historic Places in 1991. Other WPA projects included a tunnel 375 feet (114 m) in length at the southern end of Rocky Butte. Built between 1939 and 1941, it was constructed to improve access to scenic views on the Butte. The project took 16 months to complete, and workers used hand mining and drill and shoot methods to excavate layers of cinders and lava flows. The tunnel is curved because of the volcano's 5 degree grade. Rocky Butte basalt was used to build the Rocky Butte Tunnel as well as the nearby West Burnside and NW Cornell Road Tunnels, all of which were constructed by the mason R. Curcio and his crew. In total, the WPA's Rocky Butte project cost $500,000 to complete.

The Hill Military Academy, a prominent military school in Portland, moved from the northwestern district of Portland to a campus on Rocky Butte in 1931. The campus covered 150 acres (0.61 km^{2}) on the northern side of the volcano. Ran by its founder, Joseph Wood Hill, it closed in 1959 after its enrollment had declined significantly, and the school was purchased by Judson Baptist College. Today, Portland Bible College has a campus on Rocky Butte with offices and dormitory buildings, and The Grotto, a famous Catholic shrine encompassing 62 acres (0.25 km^{2}), lies adjacent to the volcano. Created in 1924, The Grotto has more than 200,000 visitors annually. It consists of two levels, which are separated by the 110 feet (34 m) cliff of Rocky Butte's northern face. On the upper level of the shrine is the Chapel of St. Anne, which sits on the northern side of Rocky Butte and offers views of the Columbia River and Mount St. Helens. Built in 1934, the chapel also has a Peace Garden (finished in 1989) and a Meditation Chapel, which was completed in 1991. The City Bible Church also maintains a location at Rocky Butte, with services on Sunday mornings at 9:30 and 11:15 am as well as youth services on Wednesdays at 7 pm.

In 2000, Portland Police Bureau Officer Mark Kruger placed a shrine to Nazi soldiers on public park property at Rocky Butte. When Kruger's past was discovered during 2003 lawsuits, Kruger removed the shrine. The shrine was stored in the city attorney's office by then-deputy Tracy Reeve, preventing their discovery during the lawsuits. Kruger remained on the force and was promoted to captain in 2009. Kruger admitted to wearing Nazi uniforms. The shrine's existence was discovered by internal affairs in 2010 after commissioner Dan Saltzman ordered an investigation. Kruger was disciplined and suspended for two weeks in 2010, but was not demoted or fired. Kruger continued to state that he was a history buff, not a Nazi. He remained on the force until his retirement.

In May 2018, government officials from the Oregon Department of Transportation began clearing belongings and debris from a long-standing homeless campsite at the eastern side of Rocky Butte, also posting eviction notices. A fire occurred near a homeless camp on the northern side of Rocky Butte in July 2018.

== Recreation ==
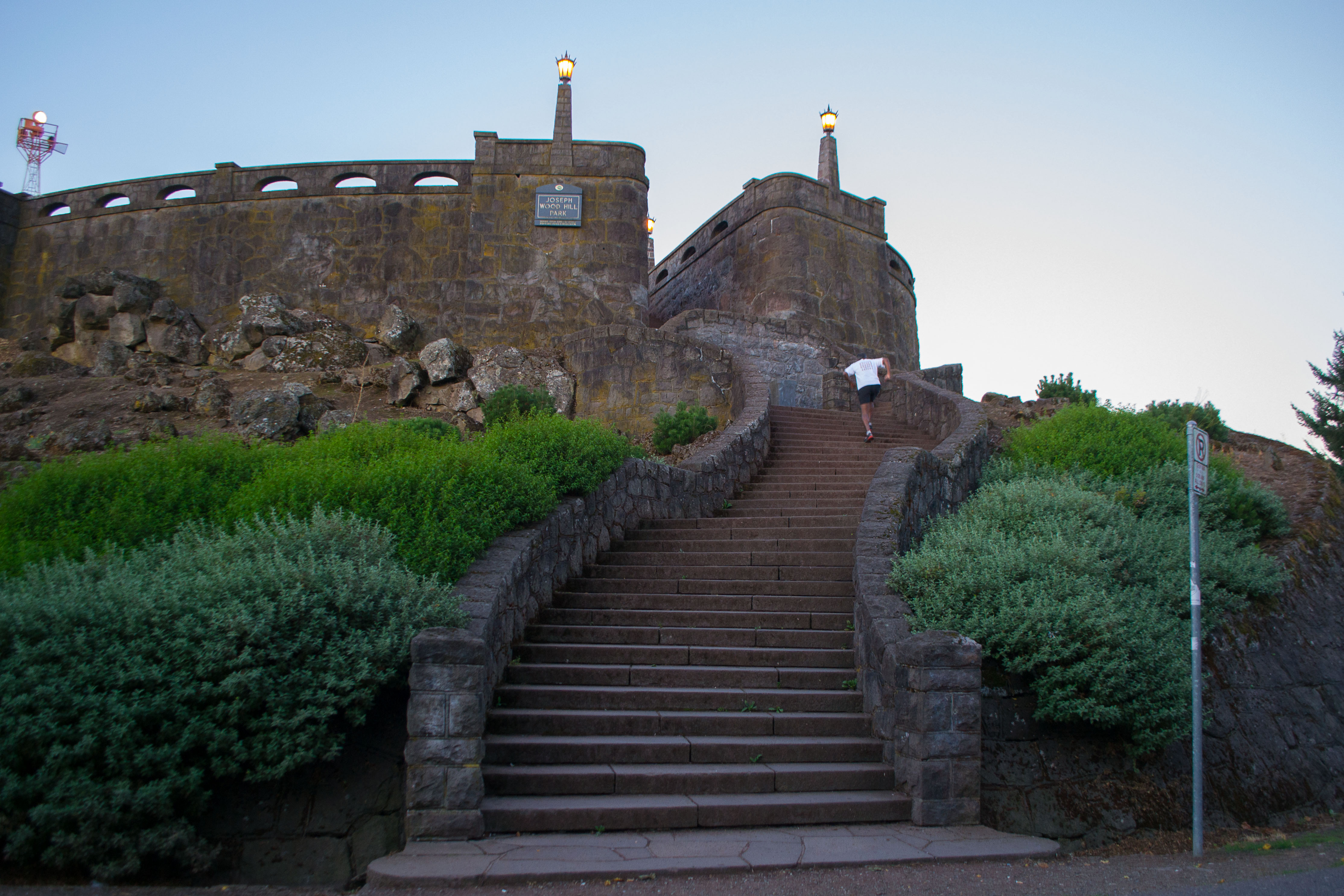
The steps leading up to Joseph Wood Hill Park on Rocky Butte

Rocky Butte is part of the Rocky Butte Natural Area, encompassing 17.28 acres (0.0699 km^{2}) of land on NE Rocky Butte Road. The summit of Rocky Butte is a Portland city park, Joseph Wood Hill Park, which covers 2.38 acres (0.0096 km^{2}). The park offers views of the Boring Lava Field, Mount St. Helens, and Mount Hood. It lies in the throat of Rocky Butte's former volcanic vent on a bluff above the Hill Military Academy campus; this land was donated by Joseph Hill's sons. The park has red, crushed stone pathways, a stone wall, and a stone pedestal adorned with a metal plaque bearing Joseph Wood Hill's image looking to the west. Rocky Butte is a popular location for seeing mountains. In 2017, the Portland Parks & Recreation bureau proposed to clear trees and invasive species in the park to allow better views of downtown Portland, Mount Hood, and Mount St. Helens, planting 400 low-growth trees and 5,200 shrubs in their place. A man was killed after falling 200 feet (61 m) from the summit viewpoint in May 2015.

Rocky Butte does not have a well-defined trail system. There are a number of climber and biker trails made by civilians on the base and lower parts of the mountain, as well as climbing paths near the summit, which are unfenced and can be unsafe. A walking path described by L. O. Foster (2013) starts from NE 92nd Avenue and Skidmore Street and runs for 1.25 miles (2.01 km) each way, lasting 1.5 to 2 hours. This trail passes the Rocky Butte Tunnel, the site for the Hill Military Academy, and the beacon. Dogs can be unleashed on the trails, but have to be kept on a leash at Joseph Wood Hill Park.

Rocky Butte is also a popular climbing destination in the Portland area, having been developed by climbers during the 1970s and 1980s. Many of its routes are top-roped, but some top anchors are missing from its routes, so daisy chain straps are recommended. The climbing routes are not suitable for dogs or children. Some of the most popular climbs are on the section known as Video Bluff. Rocky Butte provides a variety of climbs including cracks, dihedrals, slab, vertical, and overhanging face routes.

== Sources ==
- Allen, J. E. (September 1975). "Volcanoes of the Portland Area, Oregon". The Ore Bin. 37 (9). Archived from the original on August 25, 2018.
- Alt, D. D. (2001). Glacial Lake Missoula: And Its Humongous Floods. Missoula, Montana: Mountain Press Publishing Company. ISBN 978-0878424153.
- Bednarz, S. L.; Gribbon, P. T.; Gildner, J. P. (2010). Eckert, L. R.; Fowler, M. E.; Smithson, M. F. Jr.; Townsend, B. F. (eds.). The History of Tunneling in Portland: Rails, Highways, and the Environment (PDF). American Institute of Mining, Metallurgical, and Petroleum Engineers. pp. 43–54. ISBN 978-0873353311. Archived (PDF) from the original on October 18, 2018.
- Blakely, R. J.; Wells, R. E.; Yelin, T. S.; Madin, I. P.; Beeson, M. H. (September 1995). "Tectonic setting of the Portland-Vancouver area, Oregon and Washington: Constraints from low-altitude aeromagnetic data". Geological Society of America Bulletin. 107 (9): 1051–1062. Bibcode:1995GSAB..107.1051B. doi:10.1130/0016-7606(1995)107<1051:TSOTPV>2.3.CO;2.
- Boring Lava Domes: Supplement To The Johnson Creek Basin Protection Plan And Minor Amendments to Environmental Regulations, Portland, Oregon: Portland Bureau of Planning, November 1997, archived from the original on September 18, 2016.
- Bretz, J. H. (1925). "The Spokane Flood beyond the Channeled Scablands". The Journal of Geology. 33 (3): 236–259. Bibcode:1925JG.....33...97B. doi:10.1086/623179. JSTOR 30060578. S2CID 140554172.
- City of Portland Civic Planning, Development, & Public Works, 1851-1965: A Historic Context, City of Portland Bureau of Planning and Sustainability, March 2009, archived from the original on August 31, 2016.
- Conrey, R. M.; Leeman, W. P.; Streck, M. J.; Evarts, R. C. (December 2003), "The Boring Volcanic Field of the Portland Basin: Diverse Primitive Mafic Magmas Erupted in a Frontal Arc Setting", AGU Fall Meeting Abstracts, 2003: V31E–0981, Bibcode:2003AGUFM.V31E0981C.
- Evarts, R. C.; Conrey, R. M.; Fleck, R. J.; Hagstrum, J. T. (January 2009), "The Boring Volcanic Field of the Portland-Vancouver area, Oregon and Washington: Tectonically anomalous forearc volcanism in an urban setting", in O'Connor, J. E.; Dorsey, R. J.; Madin, I. P. (eds.), Volcanoes to Vineyards: Geologic Field Trips Through the Dynamic Landscape of the Pacific Northwest, Geological Society of America, pp. 253–270, doi:10.1130/2009.fld015(13), ISBN 9780813756158, Geological Society of America Field Guide 15.
- Foster, L. O. (2013). Portland Hill Walks: 24 Explorations in Parks and Neighborhoods, Completely Revised and Expanded. Timber Press. ISBN 978-1604693256.
- Hildreth, W. (2007), Quaternary Magmatism in the Cascades—Geologic Perspectives (PDF), United States Geological Survey, doi:10.3133/wri884110, Professional Paper 1744, archived (PDF) from the original on January 31, 2021.
- Horton, R. (2006). Weekend Rock Oregon: Trad and Sport Routes from 5.0 to 5.10a. Mountaineers Books. ISBN 978-0898867176.
- Houston, J. G.; Gibbons, D. C.; Jones, J. F. (October 1, 1988). "Physical Environment and Jail Social Climate". Crime & Delinquency. 34 (4): 449–466. doi:10.1177/0011128788034004006. S2CID 145338368.
- Madin, I. P. (2009). "Portland, Oregon, geology by tram, train, and foot" (PDF). The Ore Bin. 69 (1): 73–92. Archived (PDF) from the original on October 30, 2020.
- Oregon National Register List (PDF), Portland Bureau of Planning, June 6, 2011, archived (PDF) from the original on March 6, 2018.
- Rubin, R. J. (December 1973), U.S. Prison Library Services And Their Theoretical Bases (PDF), University of Illinois at Urbana–Champaign Graduate School of Library and Information Science, 110, archived (PDF) from the original on March 8, 2017.
- Swanson, R. D.; McFarland, W. D.; Gonthier, J. B.; Wilkinson, J. M. (1993), "A description of hydrogeologic units in the Portland Basin, Oregon and Washington", USGS Report, United States Geological Survey: 136, Bibcode:1993usgs.rept..136S, doi:10.3133/wri904196, archived from the original on August 16, 2018.
- Trimble, D. E. (1963), Geology of Portland, Oregon, and adjacent areas: Bulletin 1119, United States Geological Survey, doi:10.3133/b1119, archived from the original on August 16, 2018.
