= Parochial school =

Private primary or secondary school affiliated with a religious organization

A parochial school is a private primary or secondary school affiliated with a religious organization, and whose curriculum includes general religious education in addition to secular subjects, such as science, mathematics and language arts. The word parochial comes from the same root as "parish", and parochial schools were originally the educational wing of the local parish church. Christian parochial schools are called "church schools" or "Christian schools."

In addition to schools run by Christian organizations, there are also religious schools affiliated with Jewish, Muslim, and other groups; however, these are not usually called "parochial" because of the term's historical association with Christian parishes.

== United Kingdom ==
In British education, parish schools from the established church of the relevant constituent country formed the basis of the state-funded education system, and many schools retain a church connection while essentially providing secular education in accordance with standards set by the government of the country concerned. These are often primary schools, and may be designated as name C.E. School or name C.E. (Aided) School, depending on whether they are wholly or partly funded by the Church of England (the latter is more common).

In 2002, Frank Dobson proposed an amendment to the Education Bill (for England and Wales) which would limit the selection rights of faith schools by requiring them to offer at least a quarter of places to children of another or no religion, in order to increase inclusivity and lessening social division. The proposal was defeated in Parliament.

In 2005, David Bell, the head of the Office for Standards in Education said "Faith should not be blind. I worry that many young people are being educated in faith-based schools, with little appreciation of their wider responsibilities and obligations to British society. This growth in faith schools needs to be carefully but sensitively monitored by government to ensure that pupils receive an understanding of not only their own faith but of other faiths and the wider tenets of British society". He criticised Islamic schools in particular, calling them a "threat to national identity".

In October 2006, Bishop Kenneth Stevenson, speaking on behalf of the Church of England, said "I want to make a specific commitment that all new Church of England schools should have at least 25% of places available to children with no requirement that they be from practising Christian families." This commitment applies only to new schools, not existing ones.

In September 2007, attempts to create the first secular school in Britain were blocked. Paul Kelley, head of Monkseaton High School in Tyneside, proposed plans to eliminate the daily act of Christian worship, and "a fundamental change in the relationship with the school and the established religion of the country".

In November 2007, the Krishna-Avanti Hindu school in north-west London became the first school in the United Kingdom to make vegetarianism a condition of entry. Additionally, parents of pupils are expected to abstain from alcohol to prove they are followers of the faith.

In November 2007, the Jewish Free School in north London was found guilty of discrimination for giving preference to children who were born to Jewish mothers.

In January 2008 the House of Commons' Children, Schools and Families select committee raised concerns about the government's plans for expanding faith schooling. The general secretary of the Association of Teachers and Lecturers, Mary Bousted, said "Unless there are crucial changes in the way many faith schools run we fear divisions in society will be exacerbated. In our increasingly multi-faith and secular society it is hard to see why our taxes should be used to fund schools which discriminate against the majority of children and potential staff because they are not of the same faith".

=== England ===
English education includes many schools linked to the Church of England which sets the ethos of the school and can influence selection of pupils where there is competition for places. These form a large proportion of the 6,955 Christian faith schools in England. The Catholic Church also maintains schools. In addition, there are 36 Jewish, seven Muslim and two Sikh faith schools.

Faith schools follow the same national curriculum as state schools. Religious education in Church of England schools is monitored by the local diocese, but does not typically take up much more of the timetable than in secular schools. Although not state schools, there are around 700 unregulated madrassas in Britain, attended by approximately 100,000 Muslim children. Doctor Ghayasuddin Siddiqui, the leader of the Muslim Parliament of Great Britain, has called for them to be subject to government inspection following publication of a 2006 report which highlighted widespread physical and sexual abuse. Voluntary-aided schools, such as Church of England and Catholic schools, are permitted to discriminate against teachers on the grounds of their religious opinions, attendance at worship and willingness to provide religious education.

=== Scotland ===
Scotland has its own educational system, distinct from that of England and Wales, reflecting the history of education in Scotland. Although schools existed in Scotland prior to the Reformation, widespread public education was pioneered by the Church of Scotland developing its aim of universal parish schools from 1560 onwards, and given state support by the Education Act 1633. It handed over its parish schools to the state in 1872. Although these schools are now known as "non-denominational" schools, and are open to all, their traditional links with the Presbyterian and Episcopalian churches and clergy remain in most cases.

Charitably funded Roman Catholic schools were brought into the state system by the Education (Scotland) Act 1918. Whilst maintaining a strong Catholic ethos, Scottish Catholic schools have long welcomed pupils from other faith backgrounds, though they tend to give precedence to non-Catholics who come from families of faith. In Scottish Catholic schools employment of non-Catholics or lapsed Catholics can be restricted by the Church. In some dioceses, one of the requirements for applicants baptised as Catholic is to possess a certificate which has been signed by their parish priest. Each diocese varies on the method of approval and the rigour with which it is applied. Non-Catholic applicants are not required to provide any religious documentation. Certain positions, such as headteachers, religious education teachers and guidance teachers are invariably held by practising Roman Catholics.

== United States ==
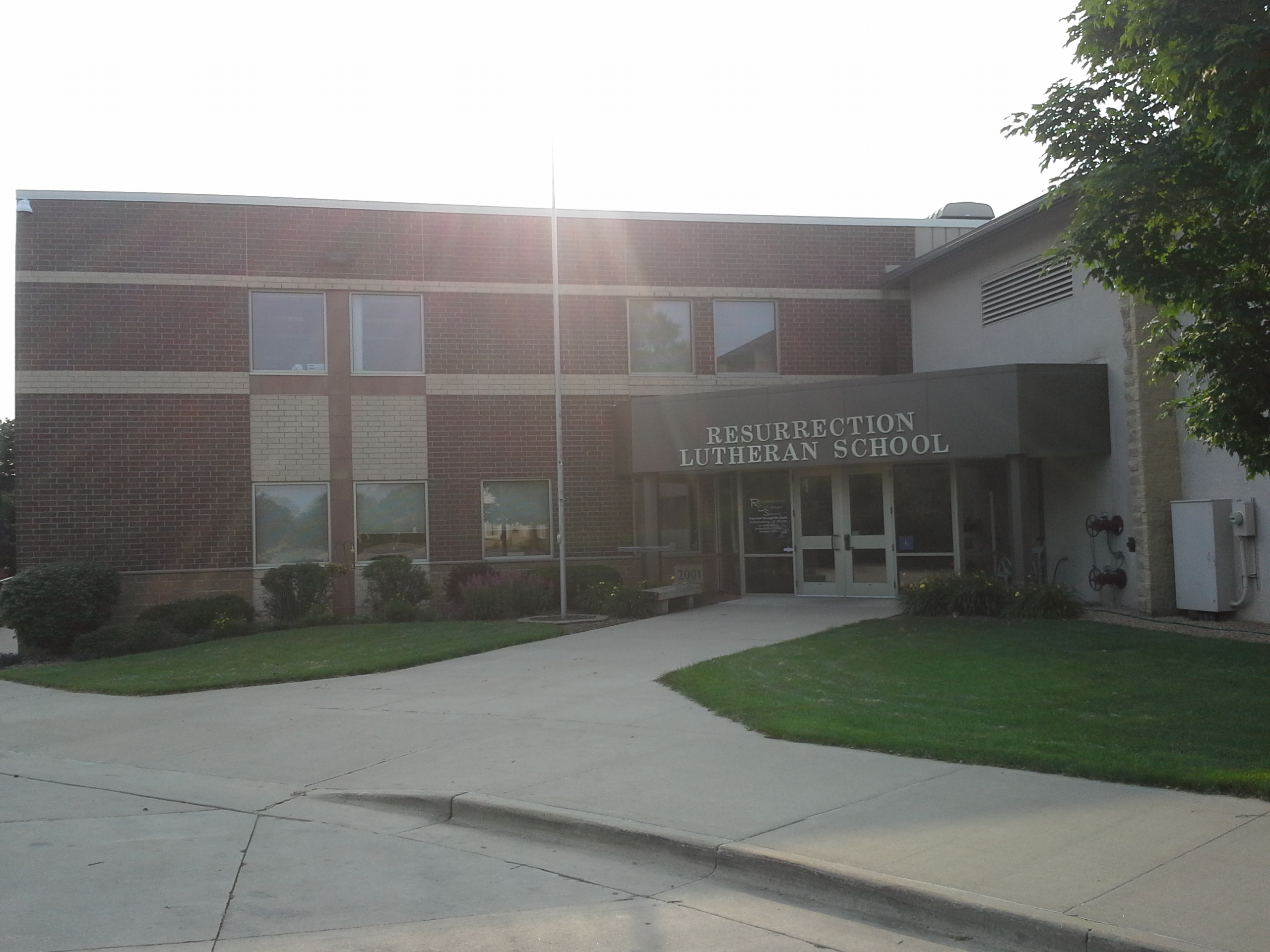
Resurrection Lutheran School is a parochial school of the Wisconsin Evangelical Lutheran Synod (WELS) in Rochester, MN. The WELS school system is the fourth largest private school system in the United States.

Historically, most American parochial schools have been Catholic schools (often elementary schools attached to a local parish), as well as schools run by Seventh-day Adventists, Episcopalians, Lutherans, Calvinists and Orthodox Jews.

Since the 1960s thousands of Fundamentalist religious schools have been founded, especially in the South, though they are not usually called "parochial". In addition to this, Conservative Mennonites, Amish, and Old Order Mennonites operate their own schools (the Old Order referring to theirs as "parochial"). Many fundamentalist Christian schools use curriculum from Abeka Books and Bob Jones University Press.

Catholic private and college preparatory schools also exist and are not necessarily connected with a parish. Often these schools, such as those in the Philadelphia area, prefer to be referred to as "private Catholic schools," to distinguish themselves from the Archdiocesan parochial school system. In some Canadian provinces Catholic schools are publicly funded and in Ontario completely to the level of grade 12.

Generally within the Catholic parochial school system, parochial schools are open to all children in the parish. Thus parochial school systems function as quasi-public educational networks, in parallel to the state-school systems, the key difference being that parochial systems are largely supported by donations to the parish while state schools are funded by taxes. Often, the Catholic diocese or archdiocese, such as those in Boston, Philadelphia, and Chicago will take a greater role in administration of the parochial schools within their jurisdiction. Out-of-pocket costs to the student attending a parochial school are usually greater than an equivalent public school. Although it costs parents more for their children to attend, teachers are generally paid less than those at an equivalent public school. For example, in 1998, they were paid about 45% less than public school teachers.

The Wisconsin Evangelical Lutheran Synod (WELS) operates an extensive parochial school system. The WELS school system is the fourth largest private school system in the United States.

=== History ===
The development of the American Catholic parochial school system can be divided into three phases. During the first (1750–1870), parochial schools appeared as ad hoc efforts by parishes, and most Catholic children attended public schools. During the second period (1870–1910), the Catholic hierarchy made a basic commitment to a separate Catholic school system. These parochial schools, like the big-city parishes around them, tended to be ethnically homogeneous; a German child would not be sent to an Irish school, nor vice versa, nor a Lithuanian pupil to either. Instruction in the language of the old country was common. In the third period (1910–1945), Catholic education was modernized and modeled after the public school systems, and ethnicity was deemphasized in many areas. In cities with large Catholic populations (such as Chicago and Boston) there was a flow of teachers, administrators, and students from one system to the other.

In addition to the Catholics, the German Lutherans and Calvinist Dutch also began parochial schools, as did Orthodox Jews.

Starting from 1855, thirty nine states (out of 50) included provisions in their state constitutions (now called "Blaine Amendments," after the failed Blaine Amendment to the US Constitution) forbidding tax money be used to fund parochial schools. In 2002, the United States Supreme Court upheld an Ohio law allowing aid under specific circumstances.

In the 1920s, Oregon outlawed all non-public schools in an attempt to stamp out parochial schools, but in 1925 the Supreme Court overturned the law in Pierce v. Society of Sisters.

== Russia ==
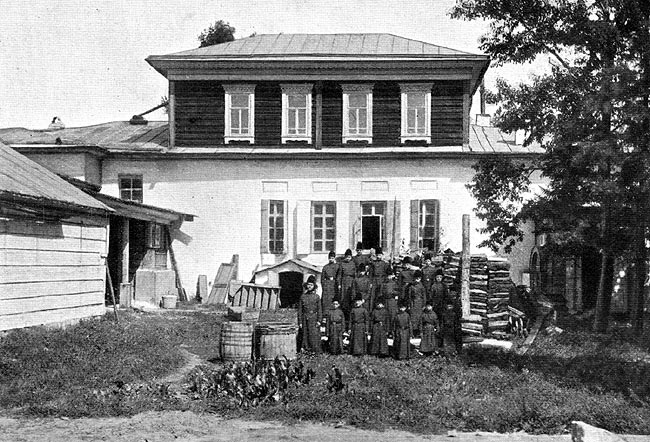
A church-parochial school of the Ascension Convent in Irkutsk, 1910s

Parochial schools (Russian: прихо́дские учи́лища, prikhodskie uchilishcha) was a system of elementary education in the Russian Empire which were part of the Ministry of National Enlightenment (Education). Parochial schools were introduced in 1804 following an educational reform of primary schools. Before that, in Russia existed arithmetic schools which were part of elementary education.

Along with regular parochial schools there also existed a well developed system of church-parochial schools of the Russian Orthodox Church which was also introduced in 1804.

Both schools parochial and church-parochial were funded by government.

== Philippines ==
Since the Spanish Era, schools have been traditionally run by the predominant Catholic Church and its different religious institutes, such as the Order of Preachers and the Society of Jesus.

Currently, parochial schools are generally those run by local, territorial parishes, while Catholic schools are administered directly by dioceses or religious institutes.

=== Metro Manila ===
The Roman Catholic Archdiocese of Manila and its suffragan dioceses, parochial schools are supervised by the Manila Archdiocesan Parochial Schools Association and its affiliates like the Diocese of Cubao Educational System and the Parochial Schools Association of Novaliches. These organisations are overseen by the Catholic Bishops' Conference of the Philippines (the country's governing Catholic body) through the Episcopal Commission on Catechism and Christian Education.

== India ==
In Ancient India, Gurukula was the main system of education though some still exist today. Catholic educational institutions are second in numbers behind government run schools. There are 14,539. While the schools are centrally tracked by the Catholic Bishops Council of India, they are controlled by the diocese in which they are located. There are 13,004 primary and secondary Catholic schools, 243 special schools, 448 Catholic colleges, and 534 technical institutions.

== See also ==
- Bennett Law, 1890 dispute in Wisconsin
- Bible College
- Christian school
- Cathedral school
- Catholic school
- Faith school
- Lutheran school
- Gurukulam
- Jewish day school
- Madrasa
- Religion and children
- Seminary
- Sunday school
- Oregon Compulsory Education Act of 1926
- Meyer v. Nebraska, US Supreme Court case
- Pierce v. Society of Sisters, US Supreme Court case
