= Compulsory Education Act =

Compulsory Education Act may refer to:

- Oregon Compulsory Education Act
- The Right of Children to Free and Compulsory Education Act (India)

== See also ==
- Elementary Education Act 1870 (England and Wales)
