= Kimberly Kempf-Leonard =

American criminologist

- Education: University of Nebraska–Lincoln; Pennsylvania State University; University of Pennsylvania
- Spouse: Charles
- Awards: 1997 Gustavus Myers Award for Human Rights in North America
- Scientific career
- Fields: Criminology
- Workplaces: University of Louisville; Southern Illinois University-Carbondale
- Thesis: Constancy and change in the criminal career (1986)
- Doctoral advisors: Marvin Wolfgang; Paul E. Tracy

Kimberly Kempf-Leonard is an American criminologist served as the dean of the University of Louisville's College of Arts and Sciences from 2014 to 2020.

== Career ==
Previously, she was the dean of Southern Illinois University-Carbondale's College of Liberal Arts from 2011 to 2014. She has also was on the faculty at the University of Texas-Dallas, the University of Missouri-St. Louis, and Kent State University. Her research advanced measurement and our understanding of disparities in criminal and juvenile justice processing by race, ethnicity, gender, and location. She also examined crime specialization, desistance, escalation, and onset using the 1958 Philadelphia Birth Cohort.
