= Bennett Law =

Legal act of the Wisconsin legislature

1889 Wisconsin Act 519

39th Wisconsin Legislature
- Long title: An Act concerning the education and employment of children
- Citation: 1889 Wisc. Act 519
- Enacted by: 39th Wisconsin Legislature
- Enacted: April 18, 1889
- Signed by: William D. Hoard
- Introduced by: Michael John Bennett

Repealed by
- 1891 Wisc. Act 4
- Status: Repealed

The Bennett Law, officially 1889 Wisconsin Act 519, was a controversial state law passed by the Wisconsin Legislature in 1889 dealing with compulsory education. The controversial section of the law was a requirement to utilize the English language as the sole medium of instruction in all schools, whether private or public. Meanwhile, German Catholics and Lutherans, who combined a strong sense of American patriotism with strong ethnic pride, operated large numbers of parochial schools in the state and widely utilized the German language in the United States as the medium of instruction. The Bennett Law was bitterly resented by German Americans, but also by Catholic Polish Americans, and even by Scandinavian immigrant communities. The law was seen not only as an insult to the patriotism of the State's large community of non-English-speaking voters, but also as an unconstitutional attack against the independence of their church denominations and religious schools from control by the State. Although the law was ultimately repealed, there were significant political repercussions in the 1890 and 1892 elections; for the first time in decades Democrats won control of the Legislature and all state-wide elected offices, as well as both U.S. Senate seats and nearly all of Wisconsin's seats in the U.S. House of Representatives.

== Background ==
For many years, Wisconsin Republicans, led by political bosses such as Philetus Sawyer and Elisha W. Keyes, had carefully avoided antagonizing the German American population, since they had considerable support from German voters. However, in the 1888 state convention, the professionals were pushed aside and the party nominated William D. Hoard, a dairy farmer with no political experience, for governor. Hoard won the 1888 election and his inauguration coincided with the start of the 39th Wisconsin Legislature. One of his priorities for the session was reforms to Wisconsin's compulsory education and child labor laws.

Technically, Wisconsin law already required English language instruction in schools, but the requirement was never enforced. Early in the session, state senator Levi Pond proposed a bill to audit the status of compliance with the state's English language education requirements. The bill provoked a flood of opposition and was abandoned in the Senate.

The namesake of the law, Michael John Bennett, was serving his second term in the State Assembly and had attended a conference in Chicago with educational leaders from various backgrounds to draft model legislation for educating the youth and ending child labor. The bulk of the Bennett Law dealt with raising the legal working age to 13 and requiring parents and caregivers to ensure that any child between the ages of 7 and 14 was receiving at least 12 weeks of schooling per year. Due to its mostly non-controversial nature, the law passed quickly almost without any debate. The problematic portion occurred in section 5 of the law, which defined a "school" as an institution which utilized only the English language for instructions on reading, writing, math, and U.S. history.

The backlash began shortly after the law was published. Governor Hoard doubled down on his position and attempted to mobilize the English-speaking population of the state for his reelection bid in 1890 by insisting that the state must embrace and enforce the English only movement.

As opposition swelled, Hoard escalated to a defense of the public school system, which was not under attack: "The little schoolhouse—stand by it!" he cried out. Hoard ridiculed the state's German-Americans by claiming that he was a better guardian of their children's education than their parents or their clergymen. Hoard had counted votes and thought he had a winning coalition by whipping up nativist distrust of Germania as anti-American. In Milwaukee, a predominantly German-speaking city where an estimated 86 percent had foreign-born parents, Hoard attacked Germania and religion:

We must fight alienism and selfish ecclesiasticism.... The parents, the pastors and the church have entered into a conspiracy to darken the understanding of the children, who are denied by cupidity and bigotry the privilege of even the free schools of the state.

The Germans were incensed at Hoard's blatant attacks not only on their linguistic rights and culture but also on the independence of their religious schools, which had been set up and funded by the parents in order to inculcate their community's religious values, from control by the state. Furthermore, Hoard's insistence that the state could legally intervene in the internal affairs of families and church denominations and would now dictate which language students at private schools could speak and learn in was considered intolerable.

By June 1890, the state's main German-speaking Lutheran denominations, the Missouri Synod and the Wisconsin Synod, had denounced the law. German-American Roman Catholic priests also denounced the law; Father Johann B. Reindl of Oshkosh referred to it as "unjust and a blow at the German people". After strong lobbying by Catholic Archbishop Frederick Katzer of the Archdiocese of Milwaukee and other parochial leaders, the Wisconsin Democrats, led by William F. Vilas took up the cause for German and other minority languages and nominated Milwaukee Mayor George Wilbur Peck for governor; neither man was an immigrant, VIlas having been born in Vermont and Peck in New York.

Traditionally Democratic Irish Catholics were initially not as vigorous in opposition to the law, with a substantial section of the community even supporting it, as Hoard had hoped. However, the outpouring of militantly anti-Catholic rhetoric by Hoard and many of the law's supporters alienated a majority of the Irish in Wisconsin, prompting the top Irish newspaper in the state, the Chippewa Falls-based Catholic Citizen, to write that the Bennett Law represented a convergence of "all the sectarian, bigoted, fanatical and crazy impurities" within the Republican Party and which had now taken the reins of power. The Germans, for their part, organized thoroughly and supported Peck. Combined with popular reaction against the new McKinley Tariff, the result was a major victory for the Democratic Party in Wisconsin, the first in decades. The Edwards law was a similar law in Illinois, where the same forces were at work to produce a Democratic win.

The law was repealed in 1891, but the Democratic Party won Wisconsin and Illinois in the 1892 United States presidential election in part due to lingering opposition to the law. It was the last major attack on German-language education in the U.S. until 1914. In the 1925 case Pierce v. Society of Sisters, the U.S. Supreme Court ruled that attacks by the government against the independence of private religious schools violates the First Amendment to the United States Constitution.

== See also ==
- Compulsory public education in the United States
- Oregon Compulsory Education Act of 1926
- Meyer v. Nebraska
