= Michael John Bennett =

19th century American politician

Member of the Wisconsin State Assembly from the Iowa 2nd district
- In office January 3, 1887 – January 5, 1891
- Preceded by: Jesse B. Huse
- Succeeded by: Edmund Baker

Personal details
- Born: January 8, 1860 Clyde, Wisconsin, U.S.
- Died: October 10, 1944 (aged 84)
- Resting place: Calvary Cemetery, St. Peter, Minnesota
- Party: Republican
- Spouse: Julianna Higgins (m. 1897–1944)
- Children: Mary Ethel Bennett; (b. 1900; died 1965)
- Occupation: farmer, teacher

Michael John Bennett (January 8, 1860 – October 10, 1944) was an American farmer, teacher, and Republican politician from the U.S. state of Wisconsin. He was a member of the Wisconsin State Assembly in 1887 and 1889, representing the western half of Iowa County. He was the author of the controversial Bennett Law (1889 Wisc. Act 519), which provoked a massive backlash from the German American community against the Republican Party.

== Early life and career ==
Michael J. Bennett was born in Clyde, Wisconsin, in January 1860. He was educated in the common schools and the high school in Clyde, and worked as a farmer and school teacher. He was elected town clerk in 1885 and 1886, and in the fall of 1886 he was elected to the Wisconsin State Assembly, running on the Republican Party ticket. He defeated incumbent Democratic representative Jesse B. Huse in Iowa County's 2nd Assembly district, which then comprised the western half of the county.

== Bennett Law ==
Bennett's first term in the Assembly was not noteworthy, and he was renominated and reelected in the 1888 election. In the 1889 session, Bennett was appointed chairman of the Assembly Committee on Education.

The new governor, William D. Hoard, had stated that one of his priorities for the 1889 legislative session was to enact reforms to Wisconsin's compulsory education and child labor laws. Bennett had participated in a conference in Chicago with education leaders from various different cities and backgrounds to draft model legislation for expanding education and combating child labor. He brought this legislation to Wisconsin and it passed almost without debate in the Legislature, becoming law on April 18, 1889, as chapter 519 of the 1889 Acts of the Wisconsin Legislature. The law would soon become infamous as the Bennett Law due to a provision of the law which specified that a school would only be recognized as a valid educational institution if it utilized the English language for teaching its primary courses.

The large German American population of the state—which maintained several German language schools—was incensed by the new law and demanded changes. The Governor, however, doubled down on the law and attempted to rally the English-speaking majority to defend the law. Despite the fact that Bennett himself was a Catholic, and that most Catholics in Wisconsin—even in immigrant communities—were English-speaking, the debate also became polarized along Christian denominational lines, as Catholics saw it as an example of the Nativist impulses of the Republican Party.

The backlash against the Bennett Law resulted in a political upheaval in the elections of 1890 and 1892, as Democrats won all state-wide elected offices, won full control of the Legislature, won nearly every seat in the Wisconsin delegation to the U.S. House of Representatives, and—with their Legislative majority—was able to elect two Democratic U.S. senators. The 1891 session of the Legislature was the first time Democrats held an outright majority in both houses the Wisconsin Legislature since creation of the Republican Party in 1854.

Bennett himself lost his reelection bid to Democrat Edmund Baker. One of the first acts of the 1891 legislature was the full repeal of the Bennett Law.

== Later years ==
Bennett never held elected office in Wisconsin again. He married Julianna Higgins of Mineral Point, Wisconsin, on November 9, 1897. He died in 1944 and was interred at Calvary Cemetery, in St. Peter, Minnesota.

== Electoral history ==
=== Wisconsin Assembly (1886, 1888, 1890) ===
Wisconsin Assembly, Iowa 2nd District Election, 1886
Party	Candidate	Votes	%	±%
General Election, November 2, 1886
Republican	Michael John Bennett	1,252	48.43%	+3.00%
Democratic	Jesse B. Huse (incumbent)	1,139	44.06%	−4.28%
Prohibition	John Monaghan	194	7.50%	+1.28%
Plurality		113	4.37%	+1.47%
Total votes		2,585	100.0%	-9.58%
Republican gain from Democratic				

Wisconsin Assembly, Iowa 2nd District Election, 1888
Party	Candidate	Votes	%	±%
General Election, November 6, 1888
Republican	Michael John Bennett (incumbent)	1,443	49.27%	+0.83%
Democratic	J. C. Comfort	1,283	43.80%	−0.26%
Prohibition	Charles Weston	203	6.93%	−0.57%
Plurality		160	5.46%	+1.09%
Total votes		2,929	100.0%	+13.31%
Republican hold				

Wisconsin Assembly, Iowa 2nd District Election, 1890
Party	Candidate	Votes	%	±%
General Election, November 4, 1890
Democratic	Edmund Baker	1,196	50.34%	+6.53%
Republican	Michael John Bennett (incumbent)	1,043	43.90%	−5.37%
Prohibition	Daniel Lee	137	5.77%	−1.16%
Plurality		153	6.44%	+0.98%
Total votes		2,376	100.0%	-18.88%
Democratic gain from Republican				

Wisconsin State Assembly
Preceded by Jesse B. Huse	Member of the Wisconsin State Assembly from the Iowa 2nd district January 3, 1887 – January 5, 1891	Succeeded by Edmund Baker
