= Hill Military Academy =

Former school in Oregon, United States

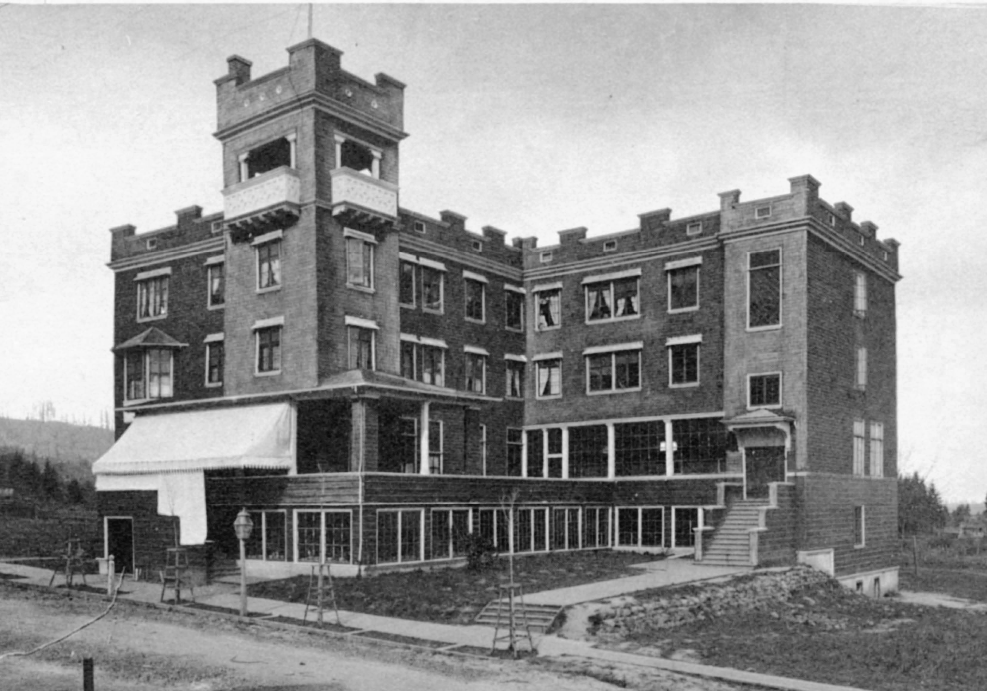
- Main building in 1903
- Type: Military academy College prep
- Active: 1901–1959
- Location: Portland, Oregon, USA; 45.549285°N 122.563149°W

Hill Military Academy was a private, College preparatory military academy in Portland in the U.S. state of Oregon. Opened in 1901, it was a leading military boarding school in the Pacific Northwest. Originally located in Northwest Portland, it later moved to Rocky Butte where it remained until it closed in 1959. The school was a party to the Pierce v. Society of Sisters United States Supreme Court case.

== Founder ==
The academy's founder, Joseph Wood Hill, was born in Westport, Connecticut, on May 28, 1856, and was raised in Connecticut. He attended the Selleck school in Norwalk before enrolling at Yale University in 1874, where he earned a Bachelor of Arts degree in 1878. Hill then moved west to Oregon where he was hired as the headmaster of the Bishop Scott grammar school in Portland in 1879. In 1881, while still serving as headmaster, Hill graduated from the Willamette University College of Medicine with a Doctor of Medicine. The grammar school became Bishop Scott Academy in 1887, with Hill becoming principal that year of the expanded school, serving until 1901.

== History ==
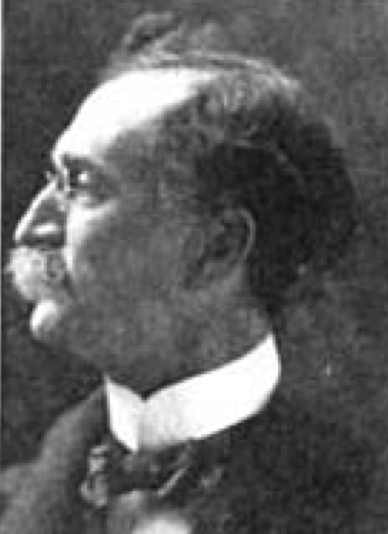
Joseph W. Hill

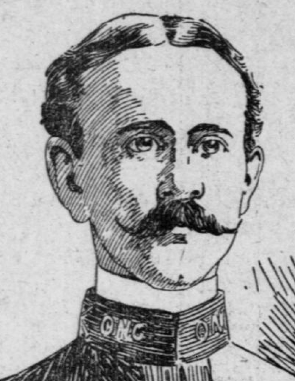
G. C. von Egloffstein, principal from 1910

In 1901, Hill left Bishop Scott Academy and founded the Hill Military Academy on Marshall Street in Portland. John W. Gavin served as the vice principal and headmaster at this time. The school was incorporated in 1908, and Hill's oldest son Joseph A. became the vice president of the school that year. The son took over as manager in 1910, with Major G. C. Von Egloffstein taking over as headmaster. Joseph Wood Hill remained as principal until at least 1911.

In 1922, Oregon voters passed the Compulsory Education Act, an initiative supported by the Ku Klux Klan as an anti-Catholic measure that required attendance in public schools. Hill Academy and a society that ran several Catholic schools both sued the state to prevent the enactment of the law on Fourteenth Amendment grounds, and won in federal district court. On appeal to the United States Supreme Court, that court upheld the injunction against the law in Pierce v. Society of Sisters.

In 1931, the school moved to a new campus on Rocky Butte in eastern Portland. It operated at its Rocky Butte location for 18 years until, with its enrollment in decline, the school closed in 1959. In the years since the site has been home to several schools, and the 2.38 acre "Joseph Wood Hill Park" was acquired by City of Portland in 1988.

== Campus and academics ==
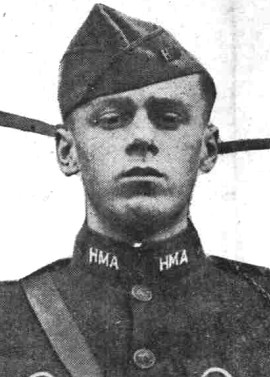
Hill Military Academy cadet Lee Strickland in 1921

Hill Military Academy's original campus was located in a residential area in northwest Portland. The campus consisted of two buildings, the main building and an armory. The two-story armory measured 50 by 100 feet and included a drill hall and workshops. Hill's main building was a four-story structure with battlements on the exterior wall, and in general designed in the Scots Baronial Style. This building housed the boarding students of the academy.

Students at Hill wore uniforms and attended college preparatory classes as well as classes in the military department. The school had both boarding students and day class enrollees. Summer courses were held at camps held on the Oregon Coast or in the mountains. The school was considered a pioneer in military education in the Pacific Northwest.

== Notable alumni ==
- Bill Bowerman
- Harry P. Cain
