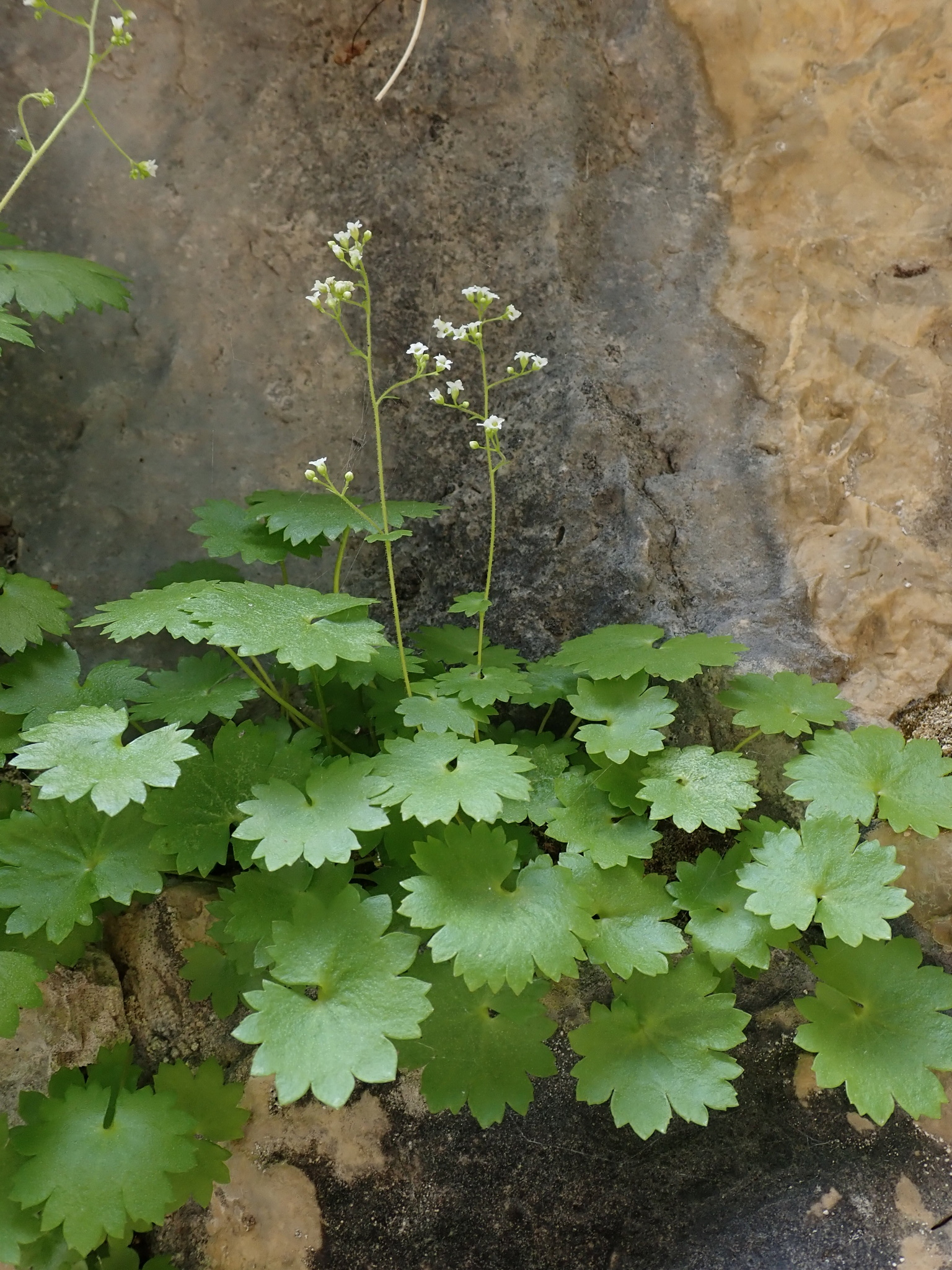
- Variety hapemanii in the Bighorn Mountains, Wyoming

Conservation status
- Vulnerable (NatureServe)

Scientific classification
- Kingdom: Plantae
- Clade: Embryophytes
- Clade: Tracheophytes
- Clade: Spermatophytes
- Clade: Angiosperms
- Clade: Eudicots
- Order: Saxifragales
- Family: Saxifragaceae
- Genus: Sullivantia
- Species: S. hapemanii

Binomial name
- Sullivantia hapemanii (J.M.Coult. & Fisher) J.M.Coult.

Varieties
- S. h. var. hapemanii; S. h. var. purpusii

= Sullivantia hapemanii =

Species of flowering plant

Sullivantia hapemanii is a plant in the saxifrage family with two varieties. The variety growing in Colorado is known as hanging garden coolwort and the variety that grows in Wyoming, Montana, and Idaho is known as Wyoming sullivantia.

== Description ==
Sullivantia hapemanii grows upright flowering stems that can be 5 to 60 centimeters (2–24 in) tall, however variety purpusii does not exceed 40 cm (16 in). It does not have stolons, plant stems that grow at the ground surface for asexual reproduction.

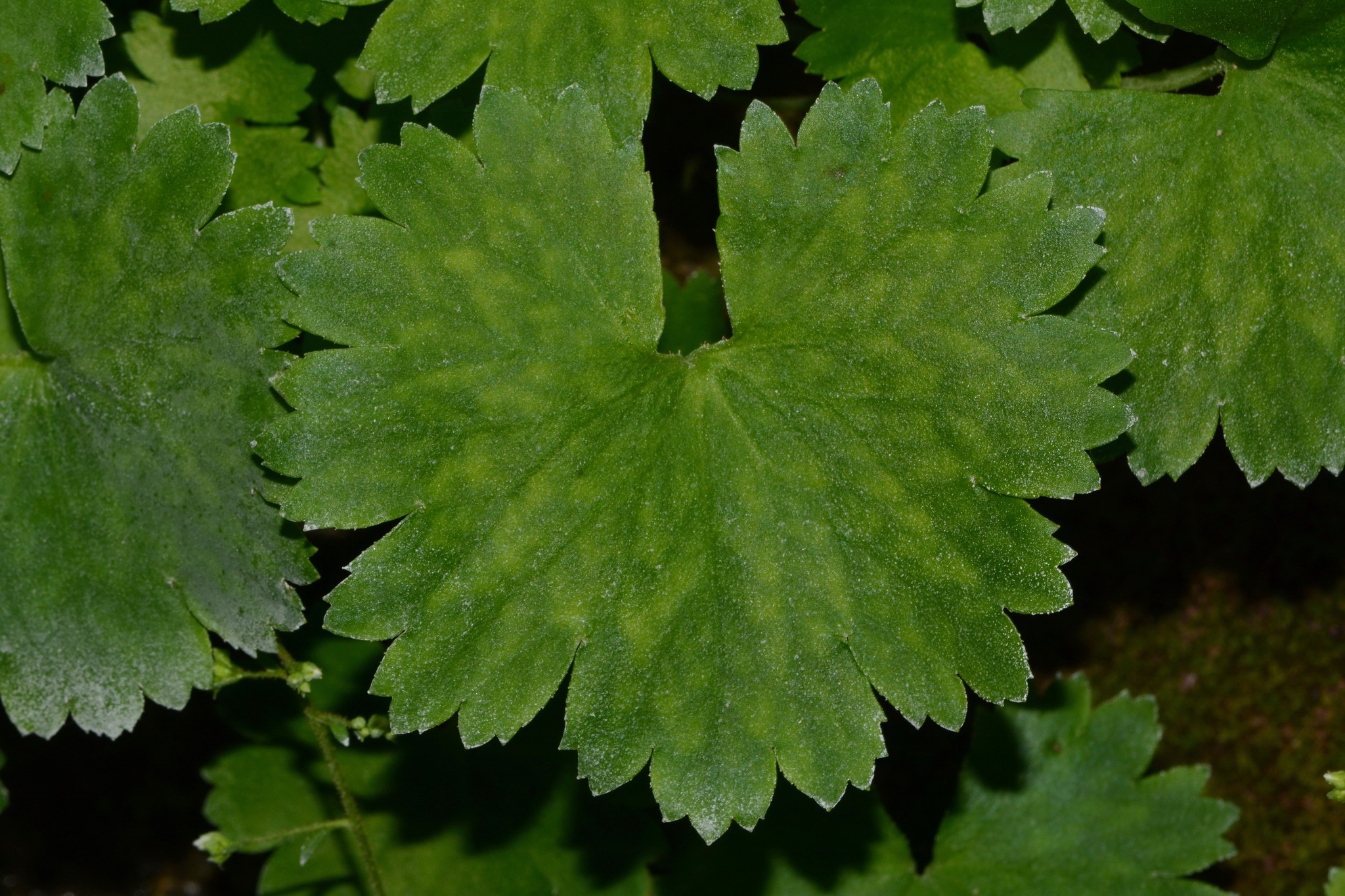
Leaf, variety purpusii

Like many members of its genus, plants can have both leaves attached to the stems and basal leaves, those growing directly from the plant's base. However, most of the leaves are basal with the few stem leaves much reduced in size. Leaves are reniform to orbiculate, kidney shaped in outline to round, but with many pointed lobes, five to thirteen in total. Leaf edges can be smooth, toothed, or erose, and may have long bristles. Leaves measure 1–11 centimeters 1–11 centimeters (0.4–4.3 in) wide, though variety purpussi do not get wider than 10 cm.

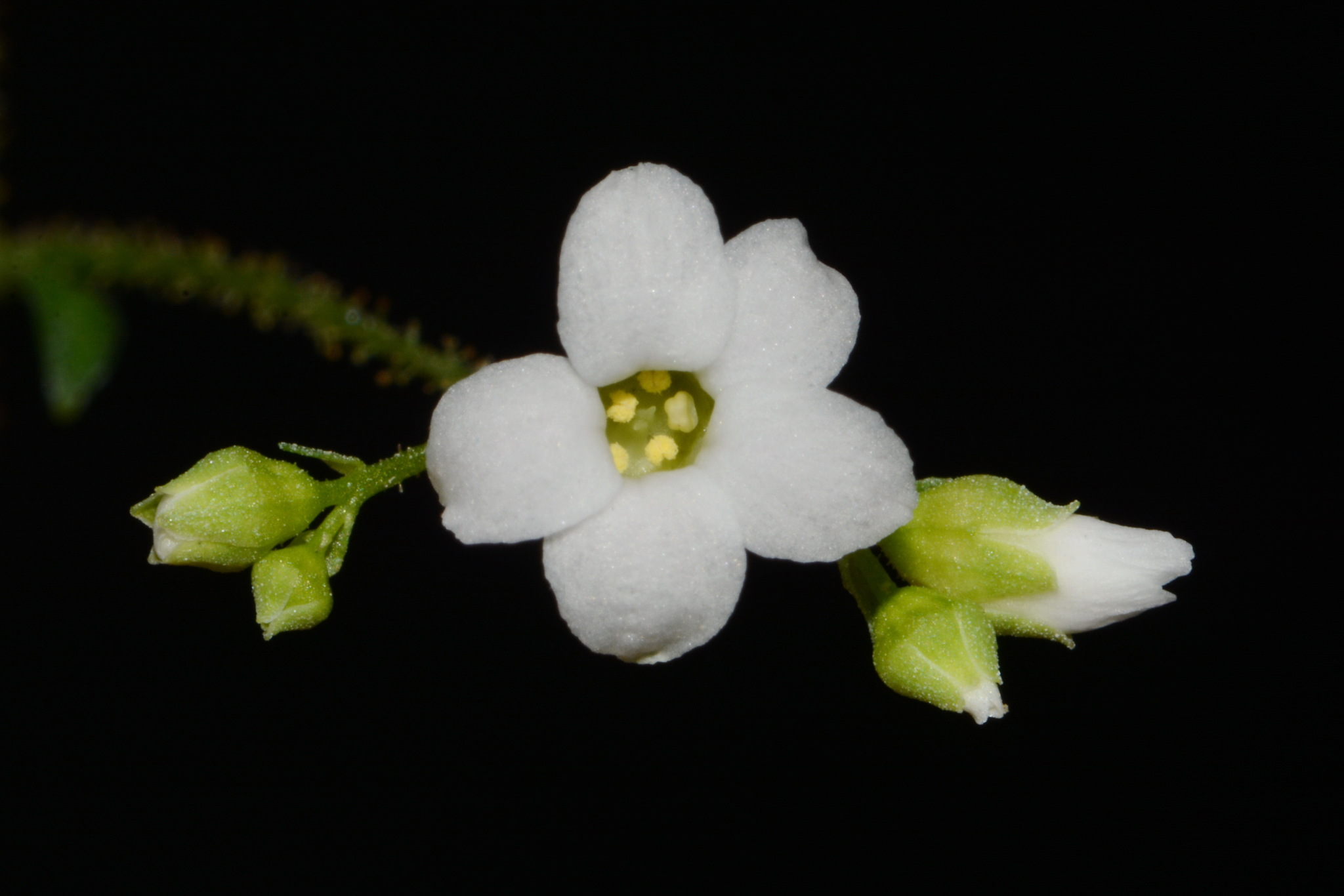
Flower and buds, var. purpusii

The inflorescence has widely spaced side branches extending out from the main stem, each with multiple flowers. The flowers have five white petals, five stamens, and glandular sepals. Each petal is just 2.5–3.1 millimeters long and 1–1.8 mm wide.

== Taxonomy ==
Sullivantia hapemanii was scientifically described and named by John Merle Coulter in December 1892. However, he had published an article with Elmon McLean Fisher in November 1892 where it was named Heuchera hapemani. For this reason many sources such as World Plants, World Flora Online, and the Flora of North America credit this earlier publication by listing it as Sullivantia hapemanii (J.M.Coult. & Fisher) J.M.Coult. to indicate the correction, however the entry for the species on Plants of the World Online does not. The species was named for H. Hapeman, a private plant collector from Nebraska, who collected the first specimen in the Bighorn Mountains. It is classified as part of the genus Sullivantia within the wider Saxifragaceae family. It has two accepted botanical varieties, though in the past botanists such as Per Axel Rydberg considered it as one species without any significant difference between the varieties.

=== Sullivantia hapemanii var. hapemanii ===
The autonymic variety is known by the common names Hapeman's coolwort, Hapeman's sullivantia, or Wyoming sullivantia. It grows in Idaho, Montana, and Wyoming. It differs from the other variety by having an ovary that is about as long as it is wide and a seed capsule that is usually about twice as long as wide and no more than two and a half longer than the width.

The variety grows in the Bighorn Mountains of northern Wyoming and into the Bighorn Canyon National Recreation Area in southern Montana. It is also found in the Wind River Canyon and on Casper Mountain further south in Wyoming. The Idaho population is found on the Middle Fork of the Salmon River. It grows at elevations of 900–2,500 meters (3,000–8,200 ft). Wyoming sullivantia was rated as vulnerable variety (T3) when it was reviewed in 2023.

=== Sullivantia hapemanii var. purpusii ===
This variety is known as the hanging garden coolwort, hanging-garden sullivantia, and as Purpus' sullivantia. It is endemic to Colorado and only grows in five western counties, Gunnison, Montrose, Eagle, Garfield, and Rio Blanco. It is distinguished by having an ovary that is twice as long as it is wide and having seed capsules that are always more than two and a half times as long as they are wide. It was given its first scientific description as a species named Boykinia purpusii in 1899 by Townshend Stith Brandegee. The botanist Douglas E. Soltis published the description of it as a variety of Sullivantia hapemanii in 1991. It was named for Carl Albert Purpus who collected the first specimen in the Black Canyon of the Gunnison.

Hanging garden coolwort grows in hanging gardens, moist habitats on canyon walls or cliffs, and are often found near waterfalls. The water in these places is often quite hard, due to large amounts of dissolved calcium carbonate. It can be found at elevations of 1,800–3,200 meters (5,900–10,500 ft). The taxa was rated as vulnerable variety (T3) when it was reviewed in 1998.

=== Synonyms ===
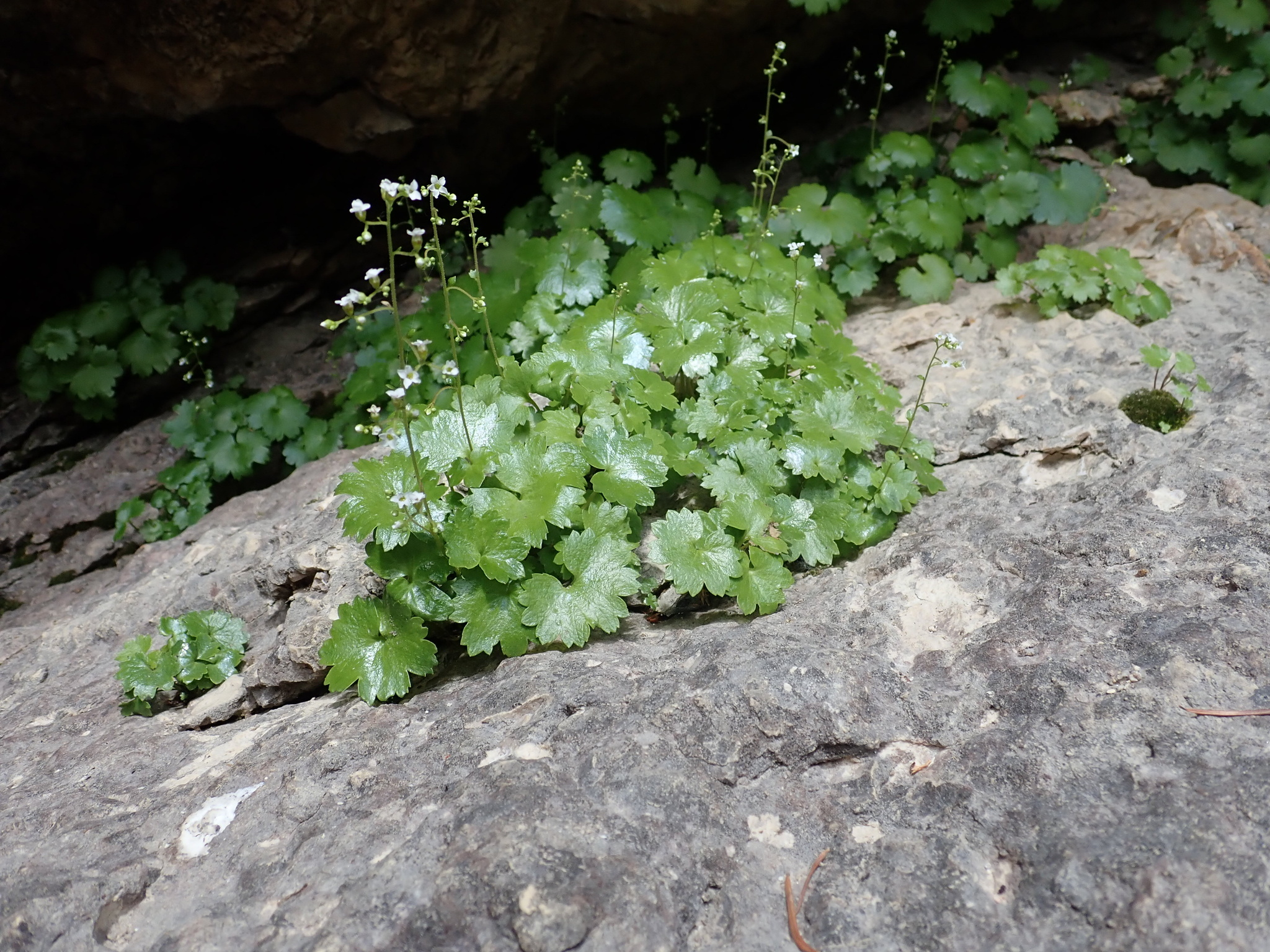
Group of plants, Bighorn Mountains, Wyoming

Sullivantia hapemanii has seven synonyms of its two varieties.

Table of Synonyms
Name	Year	Rank	Synonym of:	Notes
Boykinia purpusii Brandegee	1899	species	var. purpusii	≡ hom.
Heuchera hapemanii J.M.Coult. & Fisher	1892	species	var. hapemanii	= het.
Saxifraga halmicola (A.Nelson) Fedde	1906	species	var. hapemanii	= het.
Sullivantia halmicola A.Nelson	1905	species	var. hapemanii	= het.
Sullivantia oregana var. hapemanii (J.M.Coult. & Fisher) Rosend.	1905	variety	var. hapemanii	= het.
Sullivantia purpusii (Brandegee) Rosend.	1927	species	var. purpusii	≡ hom.
Therofon purpusii (Brandegee) A.Heller	1900	species	var. purpusii	≡ hom.
Notes: ≡ homotypic synonym; = heterotypic synonym

== Range and habitat ==
Sullivantia hapemanii is native to four western states, Colorado, Wyoming, Idaho, and Montana, but each variety has its own range and is widely separated from the other. Both varieties favor rather alkaline growing environments, such as on limestone or in water sources high in calcium carbonate. They grow in areas that are constantly moist or wet near streams, waterfalls, and seeps.

=== Conservation ===
Sullivantia hapemanii was reviewed by NatureServe in 1997 and the species as a whole was rated as vulnerable (G3) due to its limited distribution with a narrow ecological range. Though it is mostly found in inaccessible areas it is impacted by the diversion of water and changes in rain or snowfall.
