= John Fitzgerald Kennedy Memorial (Portland, Oregon) =

Bas-relief sculpture and memorial in John F. Kennedy in Portland, Oregon

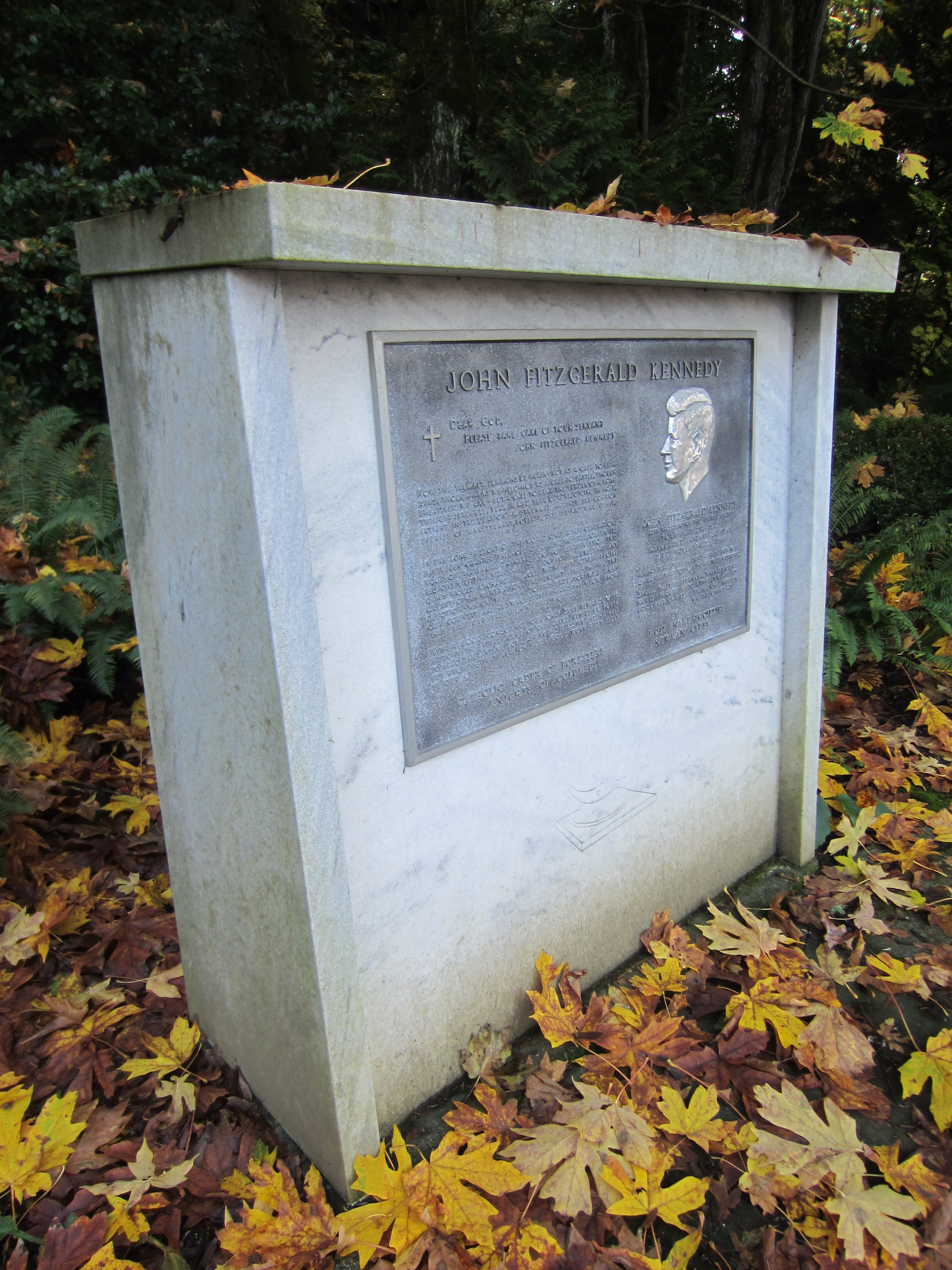
- The memorial in 2014
- Artist: Unknown
- Year: 1965
- Type: Bas-relief sculpture
- Medium: Metal
- Subject: John F. Kennedy
- Condition: "Well maintained" (1993)
- Location: Portland, Oregon, United States; 45°33′10.8″N 122°34′28.9″W
- Owner: The Grotto, formally known as the National Sanctuary of Our Sorrowful Mother

The John Fitzgerald Kennedy Memorial, also known as The Grotto: John Fitzgerald Kennedy Memorial, is an outdoor 1965 large bas-relief sculpture and memorial to John F. Kennedy by an unknown artist, installed outside The Grotto in Portland, Oregon, United States.

== Description and reception ==
The large bas-relief sculpture and memorial to John F. Kennedy is installed in the parking lot of The Grotto, a Catholic shrine and sanctuary formally known as the National Sanctuary of Our Sorrowful Mother, located at Northeast Sandy Boulevard and 85th Avenue in Portland's Madison South neighborhood. It was created in 1965 by an unknown artist. The plaque displays Kennedy's profile, the same seen on the Kennedy half dollar.

The memorial was given by multiple Catholic organizations. Its condition was deemed "well maintained" by the Smithsonian Institution's "Save Outdoor Sculpture!" program in July 1993. The memorial is administered by the National Sanctuary of Our Sorrowful Mother and has been included in published walking tours of Portland.

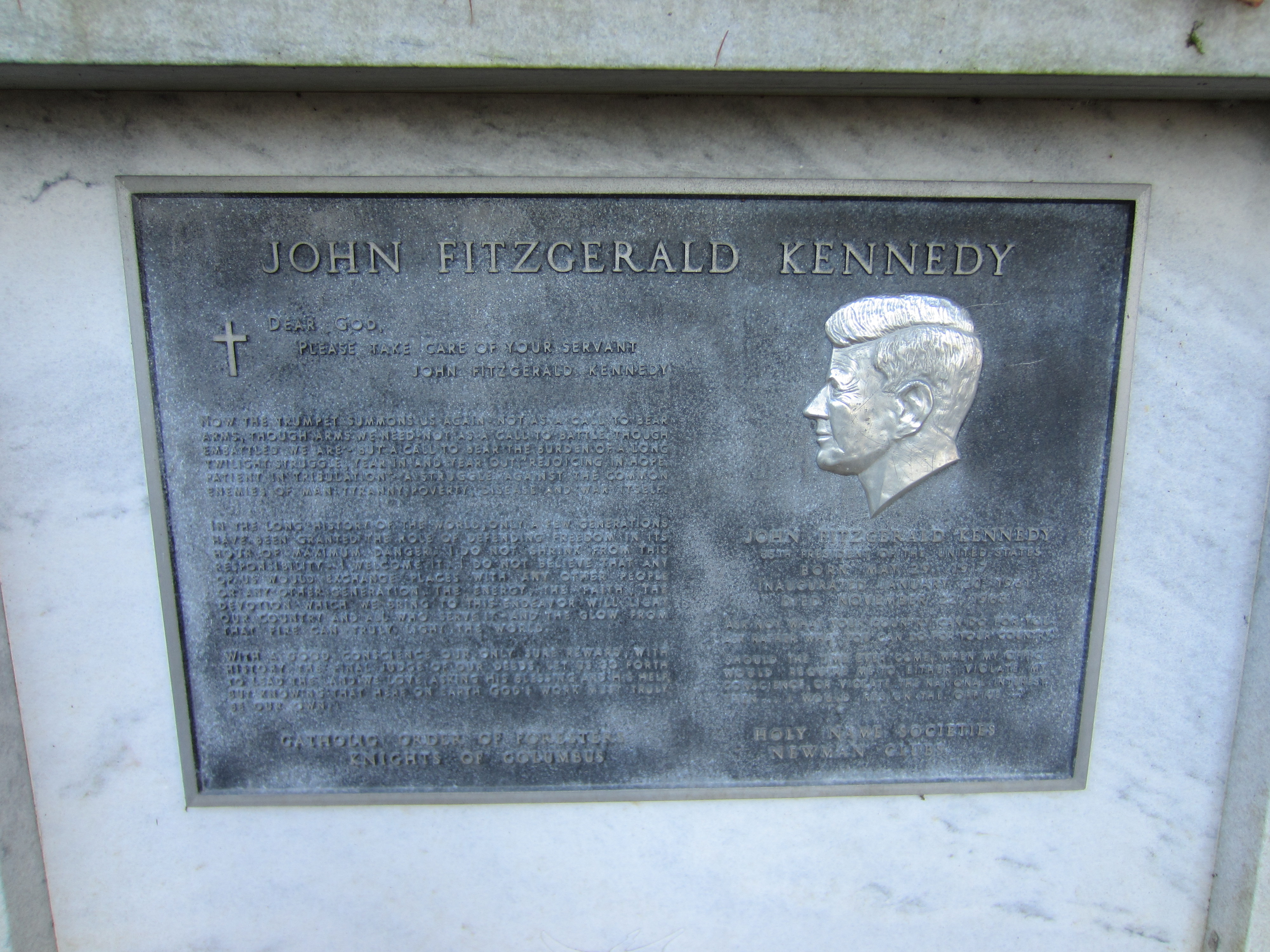
The memorial's plaque

== See also ==
- 1965 in art
- Cultural depictions of John F. Kennedy
- List of memorials to John F. Kennedy
