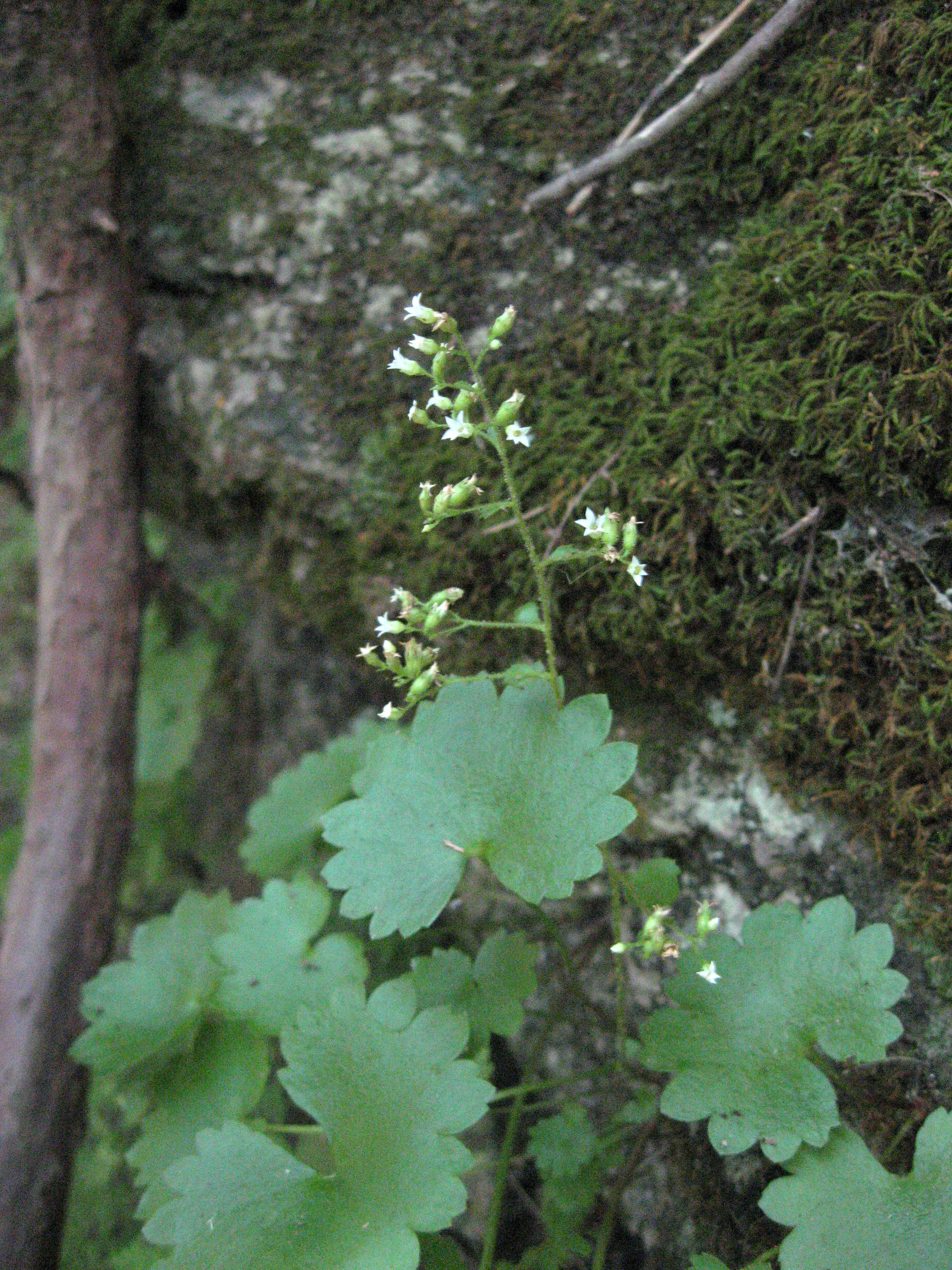
- Sullivantia sullivantii

Scientific classification
- Kingdom: Plantae
- Clade: Embryophytes
- Clade: Tracheophytes
- Clade: Spermatophytes
- Clade: Angiosperms
- Clade: Eudicots
- Order: Saxifragales
- Family: Saxifragaceae
- Genus: Sullivantia; Torr. & A.Gray (1842)

= Sullivantia =

Genus of flowering plants

Sullivantia, commonly called coolwort, is a genus of flowering plants in the saxifrage family. It is a small genus, comprising only 3–4 species of perennial herbs all native to the northwestern and east-central United States. Sullivantia is most notable for having disjunct distributions primarily restricted to along the Pleistocene glacial margin. All species of Sullivantia are found on moist, often calcareous cliffs.

== Species ==
Four species are accepted.

- Sullivantia hapemanii J.M.Coult.
- Sullivantia oregana S.Watson
- Sullivantia renifolia Rosend.
- Sullivantia sullivantii (Torr. & A.Gray) Britton
