= Pierce v. Society of Sisters =

- Supreme Court of the United States

Argued March 16–17, 1925 Decided June 1, 1925
- Full case name: Pierce v. Society of Sisters of the Holy Names of Jesus and Mary
- Citations: 268 U.S. 510 (more) 45 S. Ct. 571; 69 L. Ed. 1070; 1925 U.S. LEXIS 589; 39 A.L.R. 468

Case history
- Prior: 296 F. 928 (D. Ore. 1924)

Holding
- The Oregon Compulsory Education Act that required attendance at public schools, forbidding private school attendance, was held unconstitutional under the Due Process Clause of the Fourteenth Amendment.

Court membership
- Chief Justice William H. Taft Associate Justices Oliver W. Holmes Jr. · Willis Van Devanter; James C. McReynolds · Louis Brandeis; George Sutherland · Pierce Butler; Edward T. Sanford · Harlan F. Stone

Case opinion
- Majority: McReynolds, joined by unanimous

Laws applied
- Compulsory Education Act (Act), 1922 Or. Laws § 5259; U.S. Const. amend. XIV.

Pierce v. Society of Sisters, 268 U.S. 510 (1925), is a landmark decision of the United States Supreme Court striking down an Oregon statute that required all children to attend public school. The decision significantly expanded coverage of the Due Process Clause in the Fourteenth Amendment to the United States Constitution to recognize personal civil liberties. The case has been cited as a precedent in more than 100 Supreme Court cases, including Roe v. Wade, and in more than 70 cases in the courts of appeals.

== Background ==
After World War I, some states, concerned about the influence of immigrants and foreign values, looked to public schools for help. The states drafted laws designed to use schools to promote a common American culture.

On November 7, 1922, under Oregon Governor Walter M. Pierce, a Democrat, the voters of Oregon passed an initiative amending Oregon Law Section 5259: the Compulsory Education Act. The citizens' initiative was primarily aimed at eliminating parochial schools, including Catholic schools.

The Compulsory Education Act, before amendment, had required Oregon children between eight and sixteen years of age to attend public school. There were several exceptions incorporated into this Act:

1. Children who were mentally or physically unable to attend school
2. Children who had graduated from eighth grade
3. Children living more than a specified distance by road from the nearest school
4. Children being home-schooled or tutored (subject to monitoring by the local school district)
5. Children attending a state-recognized private school

The Act was amended by the 1922 initiative, which would have taken effect on September 1, 1926; this eliminated the exception for attendees of private schools. Private schools viewed this as an attack on their right to enroll students and do business in the state of Oregon. The act was promoted by groups such as the Knights of Pythias, the Federation of Patriotic Societies, and the Oregon Good Government League. Among the strongest backers of the Act were the Ku Klux Klan, the Orange Order and other anti-Catholic organizations seeking to capitalize on the wave of anti-Catholicism sweeping the nation.

Two sorts of opposition to Oregon's law emerged. One was from nonsectarian private schools, such as the Hill Military Academy, which were primarily concerned with the loss of their revenue. This loss was felt almost immediately, as parents began withdrawing their children from private schools in the belief that they would soon cease to exist. The other, from religious private schools, such as those run by the Society of Sisters of the Holy Names of Jesus and Mary, was concerned about the right of parents to send their children to parochial schools. ACLU Associate Director Roger Nash Baldwin, a personal friend of Luke E. Hart, the then–Supreme Advocate and future Supreme Knight of the Knights of Columbus, offered to join forces with the Knights to challenge the law. The Knights of Columbus pledged an immediate $10,000 to fight the law and any additional funds necessary to defeat it.

== Facts of the case ==
The Sisters of the Holy Names and Hill Military Academy separately sued Walter Pierce, the governor of Oregon, along with Isaac H. Van Winkle, the state attorney general, and Stanley Myers, district attorney of Multnomah County (of which Portland is the county seat, and where both the Sisters and the Academy were headquartered). The two cases, heard and decided together, were slanted along slightly different lines. The Sisters' case alleged that "the enactment conflicts with the right of parents to choose schools where their children will receive appropriate mental and religious training, the right of the child to influence the parents' choice of a school, the right of schools and teachers therein to engage in a useful business or profession." (268 U.S. 510, 532).

The Sisters' case rested only secondarily on the assertion that their business would suffer based on the law. That is, its primary allegation was that the State of Oregon was violating specific First Amendment rights (such as the right to freely practice one's religion). Their case alleged only secondarily that the law infringed on Fourteenth Amendment rights regarding protection of property (namely, the school's contracts with the families).

The Hill Military Academy, on the other hand, proposed this as their only allegation:

Appellee Hill Military Academy .... owns considerable real and personal property, some useful only for school purposes. The business and incident good will are very valuable. In order to conduct its affairs, long time contracts must be made for supplies, equipment, teachers, and pupils. Appellants, law officers of the state and county, have publicly announced that the Act of November 7, 1922, is valid and have declared their intention to enforce it. By reason of the statute and threat of enforcement appellee's business is being destroyed and its property depreciated .... The Academy's bill states the foregoing facts and then alleges that the challenged act contravenes the corporation's rights guaranteed by the Fourteenth Amendment.

— Pierce, Governor of Oregon, et al. v. Hill Military Academy, companion case, (268 U.S. 510, 532–533)

The schools won their case before a three-judge panel of the Oregon District Court, which granted an injunction against the Act. The defendants appealed their case directly to the Supreme Court of the United States. The Court heard the case on 16 and 17 March 1925.

== Arguments ==
The appellants' lawyers, Willis S. Moore for the state and district attorneys, and George E. Chamberlain and Albert H. Putney, for the governor, argued that the state had an overriding interest to oversee and control the providers of education to the children of Oregon. One of them even went so far as to call Oregonian students "the State's children". They contended that the State's interest in overseeing the education of citizens and future voters was so great that it overrode the parents' right to choose a provider of education for their child, and the right of the child to influence the parent in this decision. With respect to the appellees' claims that their loss of business infringed on Fourteenth Amendment rights, the appellants' lawyers countered that since appellees were corporations, not individuals, the Fourteenth Amendment did not directly apply to them. In addition, they asserted, the revenues of a corporation were not property, and thus did not fall under the Due Process Clause of the Fourteenth Amendment. Finally, they argued that since the law was not scheduled to take effect until September of the following year, the suits were brought prematurely — to protect against a possible coming danger, not to rectify a current problem.

The appellees, represented by Hall S. Lusk, replied that they were not contesting the right of the state to monitor their children's education, only its right to absolute control of their choice of educational system:

"No question is raised concerning the power of the state reasonably to regulate all schools, to inspect, supervise and examine them, their teachers and pupils; to require that all children of proper age attend some school, that teachers shall be of good moral character and patriotic disposition, that certain studies plainly essential to good citizenship must be taught, and that nothing be taught which is manifestly inimical to the public welfare." (268 U.S. 510, 534)

Further, the state's admittedly powerful interest in their children's education was not so strong as to require the state's mandate of an educational choice of this sort. Barring a great emergency, they claimed, the state had no right to require their children to attend, or not to attend, any particular sort of school.

== Decision ==
The Court deliberated for about 10 weeks before issuing its decision on June 1, 1925. The Court unanimously upheld the lower court's decision and the injunction against the amended Act.

Associate Justice James Clark McReynolds wrote the opinion of the Court. He stated that children were not "the mere creature[s] of the state" (268 U.S. 510, 535), and that, by its very nature, the traditional American understanding of the term liberty prevented the state from forcing students to accept instruction only from public schools. He stated that this responsibility belonged to the child's parents or guardians, and that the ability to make such a choice was a "liberty" protected by the Fourteenth Amendment.

With respect to the discussion of whether the schools' contracts with parents constituted property protected by the Fourteenth Amendment, McReynolds agreed that since the schools were corporations, they were not technically entitled to such protections. However, he continued, "they have business and property for which they claim protection. These are threatened with destruction through the unwarranted compulsion which appellants are exercising over present and prospective patrons of their schools. And this court has gone very far to protect against loss threatened by such action." (268 U.S. 510, 535)

McReynolds also agreed that businesses are not generally entitled to protection against loss of business subsequent to "exercise of proper power of the state" (268 U.S. 510, 535). However, citing a number of relevant business and property law cases, he concluded that the enactment of the revised Act was not "proper power" in this sense, and constituted unlawful interference with the freedom of both schools and families.

In response to the claims by the appellants that the suits were premature, attempting to prevent rather than to rectify a problem, Justice McReynolds simply referred them to the evidence provided by the appellees showing that the schools were already suffering falling enrollments.

== Legacy ==
This decision marked the start of the Supreme Court's recognition that due process protected individual liberties; specifically, the Court recognized that the Fourteenth Amendment applies to entities other than individuals and that the scope of liberties or rights which it protects include personal civil liberties. Over the course of the next half century, that list would come to include the right to marry, to have children, and to marital privacy.

Because the statute Pierce v. Society of Sisters struck down was primarily intended to eliminate parochial schools, Justice Anthony Kennedy has suggested that the case could have been decided on First Amendment grounds. Indeed, as mentioned, that was the primary argument the lawyers representing the Sisters advanced. Seven days later, in Gitlow v. New York, the Supreme Court confirmed that the Free Speech Clause of the First Amendment applies against the states.

The right of parents to control their children's education without state interference became a "cause célèbre" following the case, and religious groups proactively defended this right from state encroachment. R. Scott Appleby wrote in the American Journal of Education that this led to a "remarkably liberal" education policy wherein religious schools are not subjected to state accreditation but only to "minimal state health and safety" laws.

== See also ==
- List of Oregon ballot measures
