= The Grotto (Portland, Oregon) =

Catholic outdoor altar and sanctuary

The National Sanctuary of our Sorrowful Mother
- The Grotto
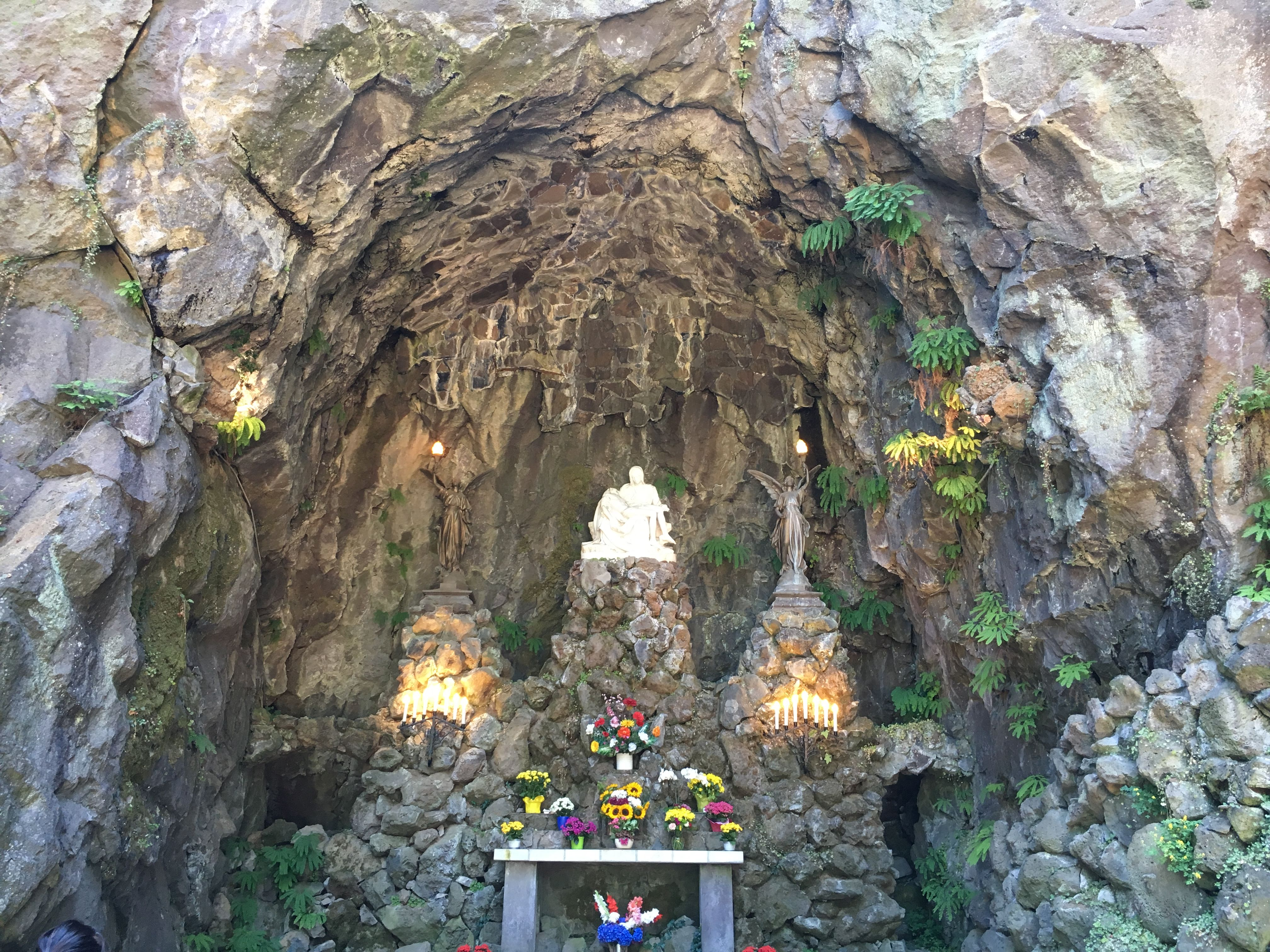
- The Grotto altar, featuring the Pietà

- Location within Portland, Oregon Location within Oregon Location within the United States
- Type: altar, garden, sanctuary
- Location: 8840 NE Skidmore St; Portland, Oregon, U.S.
- Coordinates: 45.5533°N 122.5734°W
- Area: 62 acres (25 ha)
- Created: 1924
- Founder: Ambrose Mayer
- Operator: Order of Friar Servants of Mary
- Visitors: 300,000 (annually)
- Designation: National Sanctuary
- Religious Affiliation: Catholic (Friars of the Order of the Servants of Mary)

The National Sanctuary of our Sorrowful Mother, popularly known as The Grotto, is a Catholic outdoor altar and sanctuary located in the Madison South district of Portland, Oregon, United States. Constructed in 1924, the sanctuary covers 62 acres (25 ha), set both at the foot of, and atop, a 110 foot (34 m) cliff. It is a ministry of the Servite Friars, Order of Friar Servants of Mary. A large meditation hall whose main chamber is at clifftop level extends down to the foot of the cliff; the cross on the hill is visible many miles away. In addition to a church, there are several thousand feet of trails, including a trail of the Stations of the Cross, along which visitors may pass in contemplation through botanical gardens. The Grotto also features a full-service Conference Center, and a Gift Shop.

== History ==
The Grotto was established in 1924 by Friar Ambrose Mayer, a native of Ontario, Canada, who was sent to the United States where he was a Servite pastor for the Archdiocese of Portland, Oregon. Upon moving to Portland, Mayer found acreage located outside Northeast Portland that was at the time owned by the Union Pacific Railroad Company, and had been put up for sale to be developed into residential property. Mayer made a downpayment of $3,000 and purchased the property in 1923. A national campaign raised the balance of the funds needed to pay for the land.

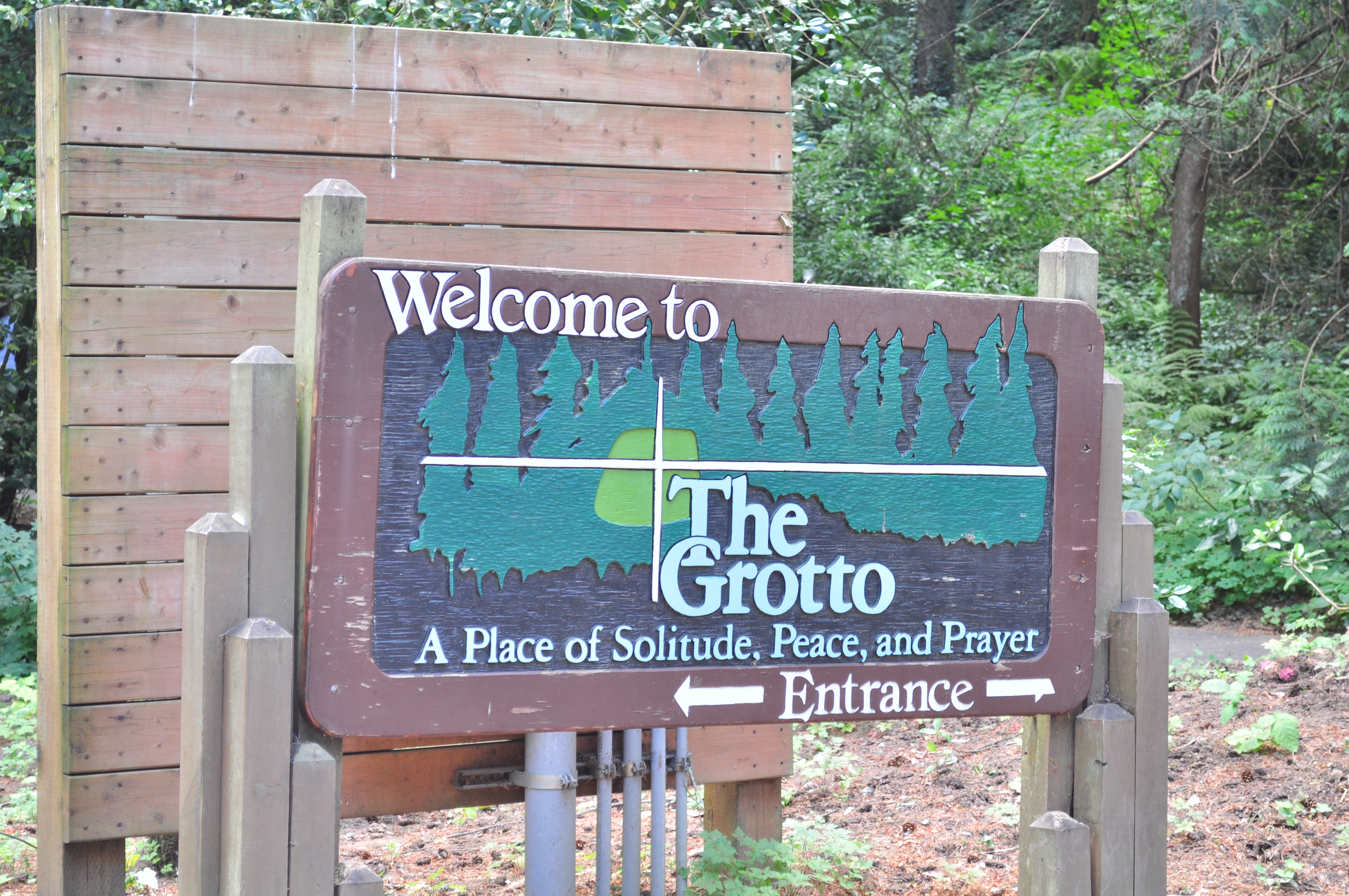
The Grotto welcome sign

Mayer envisioned The Grotto as a natural cathedral, and construction began in September 1923. A cave was carved out of the 110-foot basalt cliff, and a statue of Mary holding Jesus's crucified body was installed. Several years later, a marble recreation of Michelangelo's Pietà was also installed. Three thousand people gathered for the first mass at the Grotto on May 29, 1924.

In 1955, the Chapel of Mary was dedicated on the grounds, and in 1983 the Grotto was designated as a National Sanctuary. The grounds of the Grotto include 62 acres of pathways, forest, and an upper-level botanical garden situated above the cliff, which are accessed through an elevator built against the cliff wall. The upper botanical gardens also provide expansive views of the Columbia River Valley, the Cascade Mountains, and Mount St. Helens.

=== Vandalism ===
On November 30, 2012, unknown vandals broke into the grounds and vandalized multiple statues. Statues depicting St. Joseph and baby Jesus were beheaded, and a statue of the Virgin Mary was toppled over and also had its head removed. All of the statues were made of centuries-old Carrara marble. Two angel statues were also damaged. The statues have since been replaced or restored.

== Features ==
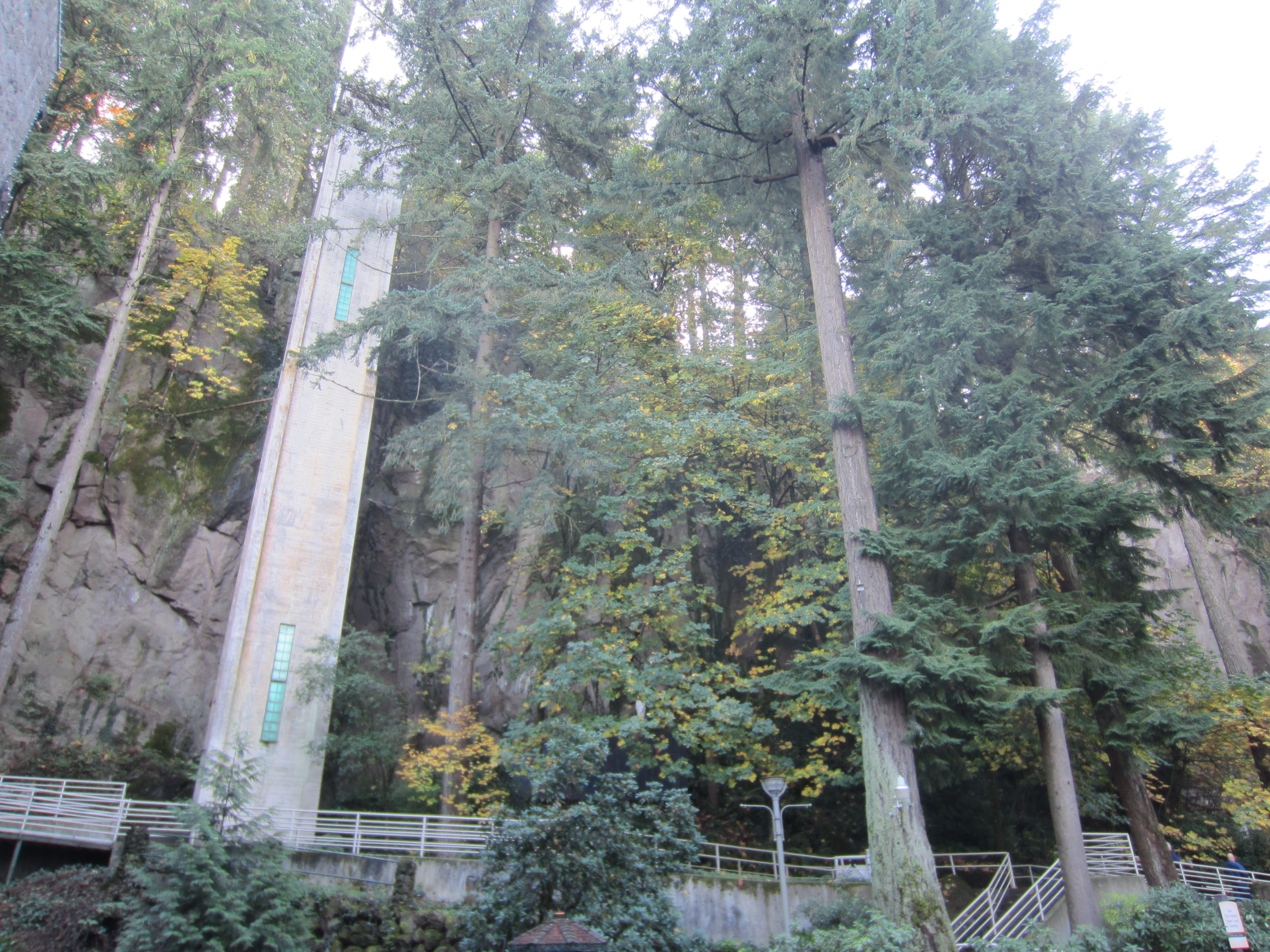
An elevator leads to the upper level botanical gardens located above the cliff.

Plaza Level

- Chapel of Mary
- The Grotto
- Stations of the Cross
- statues
- Gift Shop
- Conference Center

Upper Level Gardens

- Meditation Chapel
- shrines
  - Lithuanian Wayside Shrine
  - Our Lady of Częstochowa Polish Shrine
  - Dambana, Filipino Faith Shrine
  - Our Lady of Guadalupe Shrine
  - Our Lady of La Vang Shrine
- Peace Garden
- Mysteries of the Rosary
- Monastery
- Rose Garden
- St. Anne's Chapel
- Via Matris

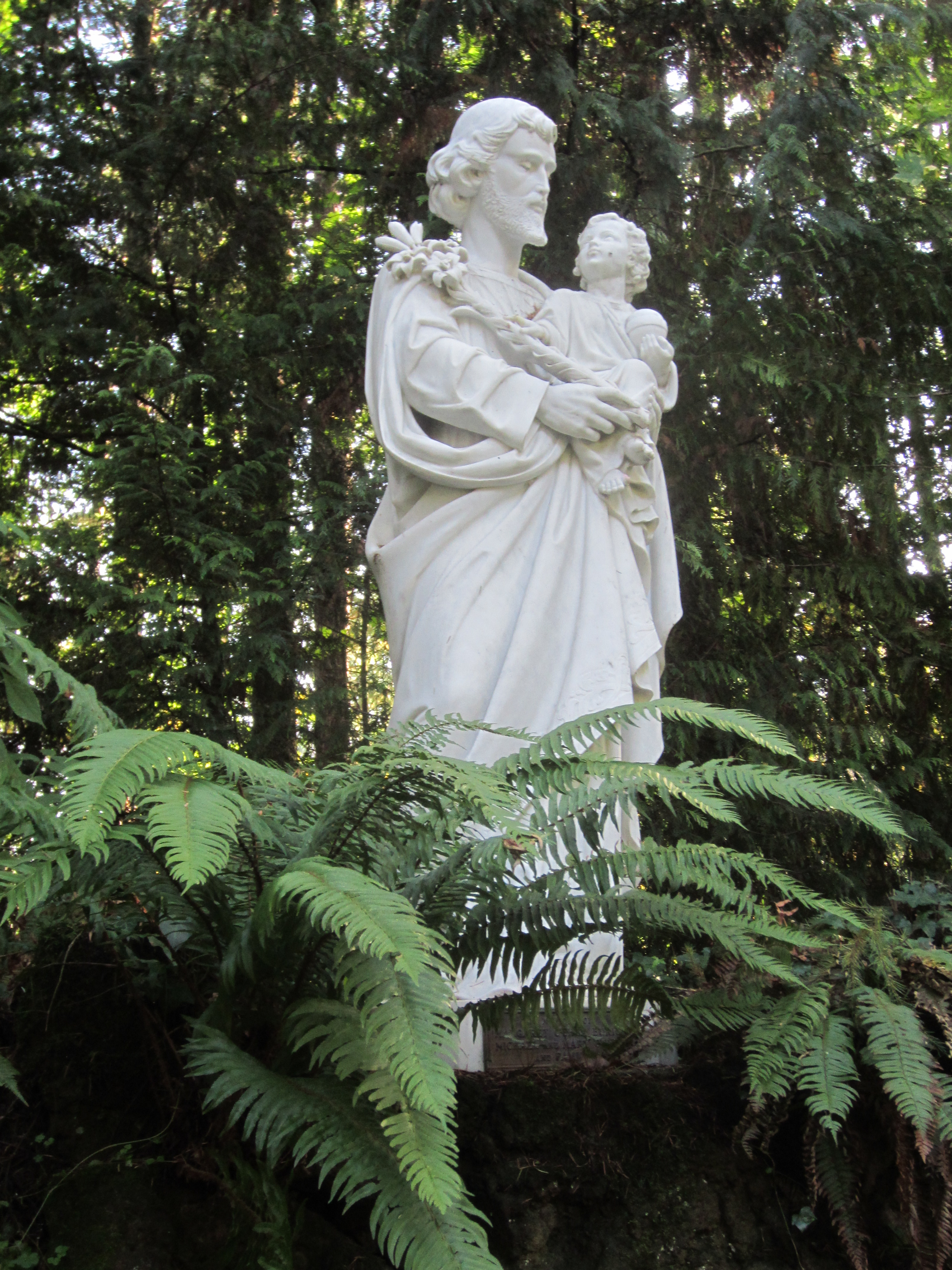
Saint Joseph sculpture at the Grotto.

=== Sculptures ===
The Smithsonian Institution has 23 statues and memorials registered at The Grotto:

- Glorious Mysteries
- John Fitzgerald Kennedy Memorial
- Joyful Mysteries
- Kneeling Angels
- Lithuanian Wayside Shrine
- Marilyn Moyer Meditation Chapel Fountain
- Our Lady of Lourdes
- Peace Pole
- Pietà with Two Angels
- Sacred Heart
- Sacred Heart Shrine
- Saints in Niches
- Sorrowful Mysteries
- Sorrows and Joys of St. Joseph
- St. Joseph
- St. Jude Shrine
- St. Philip Benizi
- Stations of the Cross
- Statue of Mary
- The Assumption of Our Blessed Mother
- The Calvary Statue
- The Christus
- Via Matris

== Events ==
There are various events at The Grotto throughout the year, as well as meetings and seminars. Every December The Grotto puts up a huge light display along its trails. The first annual "Festival of Lights" first took place in 1988 and lasted for ten nights. It has since been expanded in scope and duration, and the 2023 festival will run for 36 days. Besides the light displays, there are nightly concerts, caroling, and other family-oriented entertainment. More than 60,000 people attended the Festival each year.

== Monastery ==
The Grotto's 1936 monastery houses friars of the Servite Order.

== See also ==
- Culture of Portland, Oregon
