= Crime & Delinquency =

- Discipline: Criminology
- Language: English
- Edited by: Paul E. Tracy

Publication details
- Former name: NPPA Journal
- History: 1955-present
- Publisher: SAGE Publications
- Frequency: Quarterly
- Impact factor: 1.941 (2017)

Standard abbreviations
- ISO 4: Crime Delinq.

Indexing
- ISSN: 0011-1287 (print); 1552-387X (web)
- LCCN: 56000504
- OCLC no.: 1565415

Links
- Journal homepage; Online access; Online archive

Crime and Delinquency is a peer-reviewed academic journal that publishes papers in the field of Criminology. The journal's editor is Paul E. Tracy (University of Massachusetts Lowell). It has been in publication since 1955 and is currently published by SAGE Publications.

== Scope ==
Crime & Delinquency is a policy-oriented journal which contains research and analysis for both scholars and professionals who work in the fields of criminology and criminal justice. The journal focuses on issues and concerns that impact the criminal justice system, including the social, political and economic contexts of criminal justice.

== Abstracting and indexing ==
Crime and Delinquency is abstracted and indexed in, among other databases: SCOPUS, and the Social Sciences Citation Index. According to the Journal Citation Reports, its 2017 impact factor is 1.941, ranking it 16 out of 61 journals in the category 'Criminology and Penology'.
