= Paul E. Tracy =

American criminologist and academic (died 2020)

Paul E. Tracy (died 2020) was an American criminologist and professor at the University of Massachusetts Lowell. He was also the editor-in-chief of Crime & Delinquency.

Tracy graduated with his B.A. from Rhode Island College and with his Ph.D. in Sociology from the University of Pennsylvania in 1978. He died on January 5, 2020, after retiring from the University of Massachusetts Lowell.

His research interests focused on juvenile delinquency and criminal careers.
