= Edmund Baker =

American politician and businessman

Edmund Uglow Baker (July 8, 1854 – February 22, 1911) was an American Democratic politician and businessman.

Baker was born in Linden, Wisconsin. His middle name, Uglo(w), was the maiden name of his paternal grandmother, Thomasin Uglow Baker (1779–1841). Baker was a farmer and livestock dealer. He died in Madison, Wisconsin.

== Political career ==
Baker served as chairman of the town board of Linden, Wisconsin. He served in the Wisconsin State Assembly from 1891 to 1893. During his term in office, he was one of 22 "perfidious" Democrats named by the Wisconsin Anti-Prohibition Association that voted against the 1891 Knapstein bill to repeal the local option.
