= Compulsory public education in the United States =

Public schools and private schools developed side by side in early American history. Differences between them sharpened with the rise of Catholic immigration (mostly from Ireland and Germany) in the 1840s and following decades, and the foundation of private Catholic schools. Already in Donahoe v. Richards (38 Me. 379, 1854), Justice Appleton of the Maine Supreme Court argued the value of public schools for the assimilation of immigrants. Other kinds of private and sectarian schools served different motives, such as in the American South, where following the Civil War they maintained segregation against the public schools introduced by Reconstructionist Republican administrations. President Ulysses S. Grant publicly criticized this use of private schools, and promoted public schools as the place where civil liberties and "equal rights and privileges for all men" are taught to the next generation. He urged Congress to pass a constitutional amendment requiring every State to maintain free public schools for all children "irrespective of sex, color, birthplace, or religions" and to prohibit the use of government funds to support "sectarian" instruction Following his lead, Senator James G. Blaine introduced an amendment focused on the latter prohibition, which however failed to pass. Nevertheless, Congress did pass a requirement that all states entering the union after 1876 maintain a public school system and prohibit distribution of government funds to sectarian private schools, and other states admitted previously also adopted such "Blaine Amendments" to their constitutions. By law, state governments had authority over education and set educational standards. Laws stipulated compulsory school attendance to a certain age (34 out of 45 states by 1900) at any school, public or private, that met the state's standards.

The movement for compulsory public education (in other words, prohibiting private schools and requiring all children to attend public schools) developed in the United States out of tensions over unassimilated immigrants, including some 4 million Catholic Italian immigrants between 1880 and 1920, and Germans in connection with the first World War. Until that time many German families continued to speak German, attend German-language Christian congregations, and read German-language newspapers. This cultural distinctiveness was maintained through private schools in which German was the language of instruction. Patriotic fervor connected to the war put pressure on these communities, taking the form of anti-Italian, anti-German, and anti-Catholic sentiment and actions. The movement focused on the public's fear of immigrants and the need to Americanize; it had anti-Catholic overtones and found support from groups like the Ku Klux Klan.

At the federal level, the Smith-Towner bill, which established the Department of Education, emphasized the role of public education in the "Americanization" of immigrants, directing a portion of funding to "teach immigrants ten years of age and over to speak and read the English language and to understand and appreciate the spirit and purpose of the American Government and the duties of citizenship in a free country".

Some states attempted and others succeeded in passing laws aiming to suppress the institutions that helped maintain "un-American" cultural groups within the country. In Nebraska, a law prohibited the teaching of, or in, a modern foreign language before the ninth grade, targeting German-language instruction in Lutheran and Reformed parochial schools. The law was challenged, and in Meyer v. Nebraska (1923), the U.S. Supreme Court ruled the law unconstitutional. While affirming "the power of the state to compel attendance at some school and to make reasonable regulations for all schools", the court held that the law overreached this authority and deprived parents of their liberty to contract education privately.

In 1922, Oregon passed by referendum the Compulsory Education Act. Campaigning for it, the Ku Klux Klan "circulated a tract that pictured a grinning, torch-wielding Catholic bishop triumphantly departing from a burning public school house whose teacher rang the school bell one last time as he lay dying in the vestibule, mourned by crying children". In Pierce v. Society of Sisters (1925) the U.S. Supreme Court unanimously struck down Oregon's law. Building on the Meyer decision, Justice McReynolds again affirmed the state's right to require school attendance and to set educational standards. However: "The fundamental theory of liberty upon which all governments in this Union repose excludes any general power of the State to standardize its children by forcing them to accept instruction from public teachers only. The child is not the mere creature of the State." The decision was widely hailed by progressives such as the presidents of Yale University and the University of Texas, the Journal of Education, John Dewey, and the National Education Association. However, other progressives, including future Supreme Court justice Felix Frankfurter, criticized the decision as unwarranted judicial activism.

== Second wave: 1945–1960 ==
The movement experienced a post–World War II revival when some Americans resumed attacks on private sectarian schools, some associating parochial schools with segregation and accusing them of hindering democracy and assimilation. "You cannot practice democratic living in segregated schools," said one Columbia professor, referring to Catholic schools. At a debate at Harvard Law School, a Methodist bishop called parochial schools un-American. In 1952, prominent educators openly attacked "nonpublic schools" at a convention of public school superintendents in Boston. They were following the lead of their own president and of Harvard's president, James B. Conant.

The issue was entangled with ongoing legal cases involving direction of public funds to private schools, such as Cochran v. Board of Education (1930) and Everson v. Board of Education (1947). The Nation editor Paul Blanshard became concerned that these decisions, which affirmed the loan of public school textbooks and taxpayer-purchased school buses, respectively, to private schools, was siphoning resources from public school systems in an illegitimate subsidy of the Catholic Church and its schools, violating the Establishment Clause of the First Amendment. On the other hand, the majority opinion in Everson, authored by Justice Hugo L. Black, not only affirmed the application of the First Amendment to state and local, as well as federal government, but also anchored an interpretation of the Establishment clause repeatedly cited in subsequent cases that included the provision that "No tax, in any amount, large or small, can be levied to support any religious activities or institutions, whatever they may be called, or whatever form they may adopt to teach or practice religion." This position has been criticized by legal scholars who attribute it to anti-Catholic sentiment by Black and the Court, and who believe that private schools should be eligible for public funds. That question has continued to be tested in several subsequent Supreme Court cases. Nevertheless, the Court's high bar against any funding that could be construed as benefiting or subsidizing the private school, rather than the individual child directly, has helped put to rest the push for compulsory public education in the United States.

== See also ==
- Compulsory education
- Education in the United States
