= Oregon Compulsory Education Act =

1922 law mandating public school education

The Compulsory Education Act or Oregon School Law was a 1922 law in the U.S. state of Oregon that required school age children to attend only public schools. The United States Supreme Court later struck down the law as unconstitutional.

== Background ==
In the late 19th and early 20th centuries, millions of immigrants from Southern and Eastern Europe poured into the United States for economic and social opportunities, many of whom were poor peasants of Catholic and Jewish faith. Since the U.S. was predominantly a Protestant society at the time, many saw these new immigrants as a threat: criminals, competitors for jobs and housing, and adhering to faiths supposedly incompatible with American values. The Oregon State Immigration Commission stated in its 1912 annual report:

No class of citizens is more valuable to Oregon than is the industrious, thrifty, foreign-born farmer, who emigrates from unfavorable European conditions to carve out a home for his family in a new country. There is a certain immigration from Europe which is undesirable, especially that which congregates in our cities and towns, creating slum districts living below the standard of American workmen, and entering into ruinous competition with American labor.

In 1920, 13% of the Oregon population were immigrants, 8% were Catholic, with less than 0.4% black due to the state's black exclusion laws. Only seven percent of Oregon students attended private schools, more than three quarters of them run by the Catholic Church. In 1920, sociologist John Daniels said of the public schools: “[Children] go into the kindergarten as little Poles or Italians or Finns, babbling in the tongues of their parents, and at the end of half a dozen years or more… [They] emerge, looking, talking, thinking, and behaving generally like full-fledged Americans.” For Protestants, public schools seemed like the great American melting pot, teaching “Pure Americanism” to new immigrants and assimilating them into Protestant culture.

== Enacting the Oregon Compulsory Education Act ==
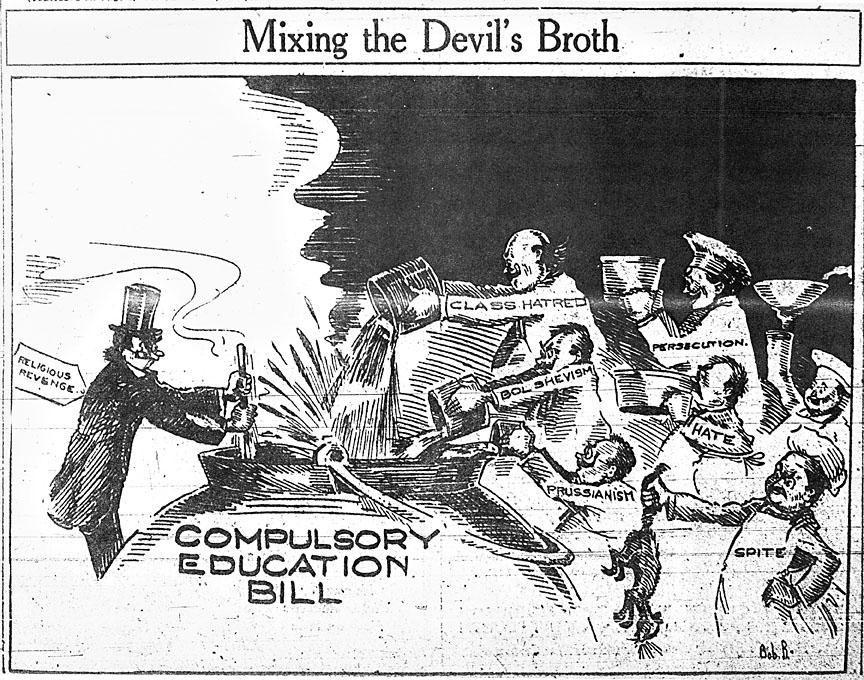
Political cartoon from the Portland Telegram criticizing the Act and depicting how it can brew resentment in immigrant communities (1922)

In 1922, the Masonic Grand Lodge of Oregon sponsored an initiative to require all school-age children to attend public schools, officially called the Compulsory Education Act and unofficially known as the Oregon School Law. With support including the state Ku Klux Klan and 1922 Democratic gubernatorial candidate Walter M. Pierce, the law was passed by a referendum vote of 115,506 to 103,685. It aimed mainly to shut down Catholic schools in Oregon, but also affected other private and military schools.

The law required all children between eight and sixteen years old to attend school to attend only public schools, forcing private or parochial schools to close. Outraged Catholics organized locally and nationally for the right to send their children to Catholic schools. Before it went into effect, the law was challenged in court and eventually struck down by the United States Supreme Court in Pierce v. Society of Sisters (1925). In its 1925 decision, the court declared the Oregon School Law unconstitutional, a ruling that has been called "the Magna Carta of the parochial school system", asserting that "the child is not the mere creature of the state". It secured the legal existence of private schools in The United States.

In 1929, Pope Pius XI explicitly referenced this Supreme Court case in his encyclical Divini illius Magistri on Catholic education:

The fundamental theory of liberty upon which all governments in this Union repose excludes any general power of the State to standardize its children by forcing them to accept instruction from public teachers only. The child is not the mere creature of the State; those who nurture him and direct his destiny have the right coupled with the high duty, to recognize, and prepare him for additional duties.

== See also ==
- Bennett Law
- Meyer v. Nebraska
- Pierce v. Society of Sisters
