= White Tail Ridge Formation =

Geologic formation in Oregon, United States

- Stratigraphic range: Early Eocene
- Type: Formation
- Unit of: Umpqua Group
- Sub-units: Berry Creek Member; Remote Member; Coquille River Member; Rasler Creek tongue
- Underlies: Tyee Formation
- Overlies: Tenmile Formation
- Area: Southwestern Oregon
- Thickness: Up to several thousand feet

Lithology
- Primary: Sandstone, conglomerate, Siltstone
- Other: Mudstone, Coal

Location
- Coordinates: 43.2299°N 123.1000°W
- Region: Douglas County, Oregon
- Country: United States
- Extent: Southern Oregon Coast Range and Umpqua Basin

Type section
- Named for: White Tail Ridge, Douglas County
- Named by: In-Soo Ryu and Alan R. Niem
- Year defined: 1992

The White Tail Ridge Formation is a geologic formation in Oregon. It preserves fossils dating back to the Paleogene period. The formation records fluvial, deltaic, and shallow-marine deposits along the margin of an Eocene basin of southwestern Oregon. Conglomeratic intervals contain clasts derived from volcanic, plutonic, metamorphic, and sedimentary source terranes associated with tectonic uplift in the Klamath Mountains and adjacent regions.

The formation preserves marine invertebrate fossils, plant material, and carbonaceous deposits indicative of warm, humid Paleogene environments. It is regionally overlain by the Tyee Formation and overlies older lower Eocene strata including the Tenmile Formation.

== See also ==
- List of fossiliferous stratigraphic units in Oregon
- Paleontology in Oregon
