= Camas Valley Formation =

Geologic formation in Oregon, United States

- Stratigraphic range: Early Eocene (Paleogene)
- Type: Formation
- Unit of: Umpqua Group
- Underlies: Tyee Formation
- Overlies: Umpqua Group strata
- Thickness: over 1,500 ft (460 m)

Lithology
- Primary: Mudstone, siltstone
- Other: Sandstone (minor)

Location
- Coordinates: 43.3099°N 123.0800°W
- Region: Douglas County, Oregon
- Country: United States
- Extent: Southern Oregon Coast Range

Type section
- Named for: Camas Valley

The Camas Valley Formation is an early Eocene marine unit within the southern Tyee Basin composed predominantly of dark-gray mudstone and siltstone with minor sandstone interbeds. The formation was deposited during a marine transgression in relatively low-energy conditions and locally contains calcareous concretions and fossiliferous beds. It conformably overlies older Umpqua Group strata and is overlain by the Tyee Formation. The unit is regionally extensive in the southern Oregon Coast Range and commonly reaches thicknesses of more than 1,500 feet.

== See also ==
- List of fossiliferous stratigraphic units in Oregon
- Paleontology in Oregon
