= Willamette fleabane =

Willamette fleabane is a common name for several plants and may refer to:

- Erigeron decumbens
- Erigeron robustior
