= White cushion fleabane =

White cushion fleabane is a common name for several plants native to the western United States and may refer to:

- Erigeron disparipilus
- Erigeron robustior
