= Lake Allison =

- Location within Oregon Location within the United States
- Location: Willamette Valley, Oregon
- Coordinates: 45°N 123°W
- Type: Temporary lake
- Primary inflows: Glacial Lake Missoula
- Basin countries: United States
- Max. length: 111 mi (179 km)
- Max. width: 31 mi (50 km)
- Surface area: 3,000 sq mi (7,800 km^{2})
- Average depth: 200 ft (61 m)
- Max. depth: 400 ft (120 m)

Lake Allison was a temporary lake in the Willamette Valley of Oregon, formed periodically by the Missoula Floods from 15,000 to 13,000 BC. The lake is the main cause of the rich and fertile soil that now characterizes the Willamette Valley.

== History ==
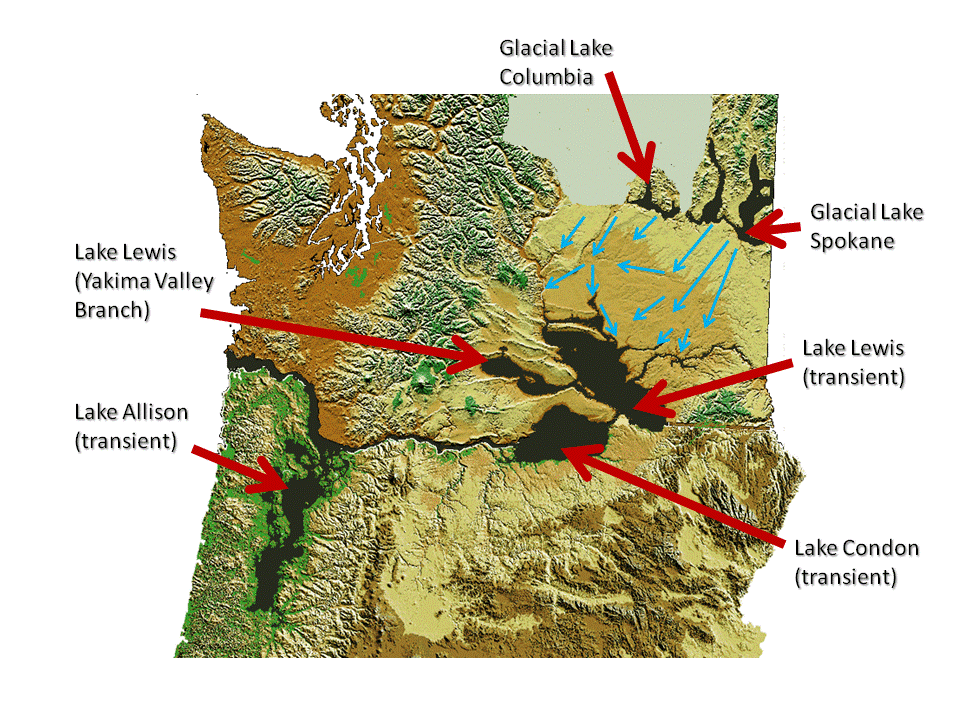
Location of the former Lake Allison and former neighboring lakes

Willamette Valley fertility, like the Palouse silt, is in large part due to the largest freshwater flood scientifically documented in history. The ice floods started in Lake Missoula in Montana 12,000 to 15,000 years ago during the Pleistocene and flowed down through eastern Washington, bringing fertile soil to the valley as it flowed out the Columbia River Gorge. The narrows at Kalama, Washington, restricted the flow of water, causing it to back up and flood the Willamette Valley to a depth of 300 to 400 feet (91 to 122 m) above sea level as far south as Eugene. The Willamette Valley had multiple floods during the last ice age, possibly reaching 100 floods separated by centuries, to depths of 300–400 feet. If 300-to-400-foot-deep (91 to 122 m) floodwaters descended on the valley today, in Portland (elevation 20 feet (6.1 m), only the tops of the West Hills, Mount Tabor, Rocky Butte, Kelly Butte and Mount Scott would be visible, as would the US Bancorp Tower 536 feet (163 m) and the Wells Fargo Center 546 feet (166 m). Newberg’s elevation is 175 feet (53 m) above sea level, Oregon City 138 feet (42 m), McMinnville 157 feet (48 m), Salem 154 feet (47 m), Corvallis 235 feet (72 m) and Eugene 430 feet (130 m), likely rising above all of them. The lake eventually flowed out and drained, leaving 180 to 200 feet (55 to 61 m) of layered sedimentary soils throughout the Tualatin, Yamhill and Willamette valleys.

== Name ==
Geologists named the lake after Oregon State University geologist Ira S. Allison. Among other things, he was the first person to identify and correlate Willamette silt soil in 1953 with soils at the former lake bed of Lake Lewis in eastern Washington. In the 1930s he had documented hundreds of non-native boulders (also known as glacial erratics) that had been transported by the floods on icebergs and had left a ring around the lower hills surrounding the Willamette Valley. The most notable of these is the Bellevue Erratic, off Highway 18 west of McMinnville.

== See also ==
- List of lakes in Oregon
