= Suplee, Oregon =

Unincorporated community in the state of Oregon, United States

- Unincorporated community
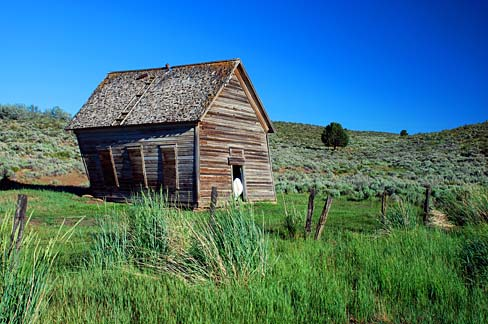
- Former Suplee School

- Location within the state of Oregon Suplee (the United States)
- Coordinates: 44°4′10″N 119°40′36″W
- Country: United States
- State: Oregon
- County: Crook
- Established: 1894
- Elevation: 4,564 ft (1,391 m)
- Time zone: UTC-8 (Pacific (PST))
  - Summer (DST): UTC-7 (PDT)
- GNIS feature ID: 1150695

Suplee is an unincorporated historic community in eastern Crook County, Oregon, United States. It was located about 18 miles (29 km) east of Paulina, near the Crook-Grant county line. The Suplee area was settled by people of French and Métis descent from the French Prairie area in Marion County, including the great-granddaughter of Étienne Lucier.

When Suplee post office was established in 1894, resident Charles Dorling suggested the name "Suplee," his mother's maiden name. Originally in Grant County, the office was moved 3 miles (4.8 km) west to Crook County in 1902. The post office ran intermittently, closing for good in 1943, with mail to Paulina.

As of 1972, author Ralph Friedman said there was nothing left at the old townsite, although there were still a few ranch buildings in the area.

At one time there was a Suplee School (44.0244°N 119.6665°W). Suplee (DeLore) Cemetery is listed by the Oregon Parks and Recreation Department as a historic cemetery.

The area is known for having the oldest sedimentary rocks in the state. The geologic area of the Suplee Formation is often referred to as the Suplee-Izee area.
