= Tenmile Formation =

Geologic formation in Oregon

Coordinates: 43.2698°N 123.1399°W

- Stratigraphic range: Eocene, Paleogene
- Type: Formation
- Unit of: Tyee Basin

Lithology
- Primary: Mudstone, siltstone, sandstone
- Other: Carbonaceous mudstone, minor coal

Location
- Region: Douglas County, Oregon
- Country: United States
- Extent: Southern Oregon Coast Range

The Tenmile Formation is a geologic formation in Oregon. It is part of the Eocene sedimentary succession of the Tyee Basin. Organic matter in these rocks is generally low in abundance and predominantly derived from land plants, producing gas-prone kerogen. The strata are also thermally immature and have not generated significant hydrocarbons.

== See also ==
- List of fossiliferous stratigraphic units in Oregon
- Paleontology in Oregon
