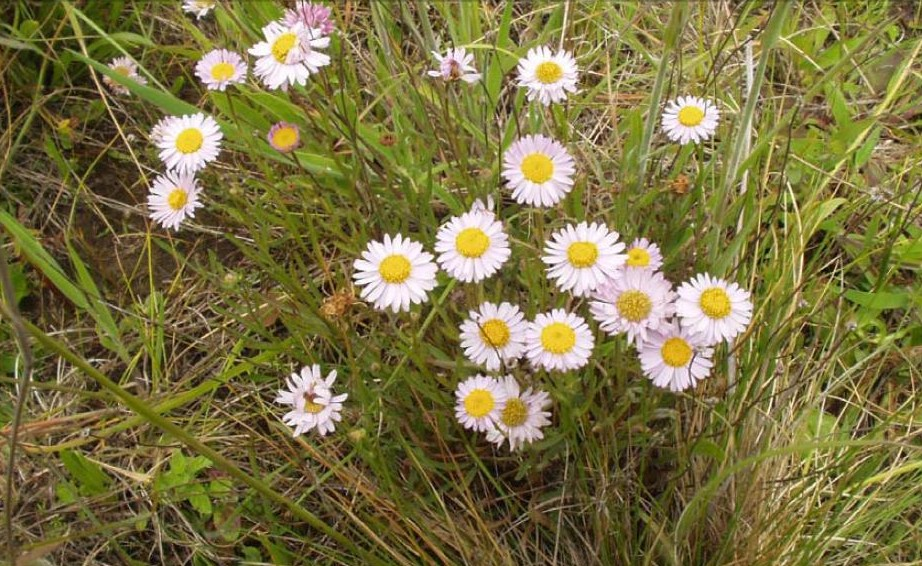
- var. decumbens

Conservation status
- Critically Imperiled (NatureServe)

Scientific classification
- Kingdom: Plantae
- Clade: Tracheophytes
- Clade: Angiosperms
- Clade: Eudicots
- Clade: Asterids
- Order: Asterales
- Family: Asteraceae
- Genus: Erigeron
- Species: E. decumbens

Binomial name
- Erigeron decumbens Nutt.

= Erigeron decumbens =

Species of flowering plant

Erigeron decumbens is a species of flowering plant in the family Asteraceae known by the common names Willamette fleabane or Willamette daisy. It is native to Oregon and California in the United States.

The taxonomy of the plant varies by author. It may be treated as a species with two varieties, the Californian variety var. robustior and the rare and endangered Oregon variety, var. decumbens. Alternately, the rare var. decumbens may be the only variety included within the species description and so named Erigeron decumbens, with var. robustior separated and named Erigeron robustior.

The Oregon plant, var. decumbens or alternately Erigeron decumbens, is a federally listed endangered species of the United States. There are 28 occurrences growing in increasingly rare prairie habitat in the Willamette Valley.

The plant is a perennial herb growing up to about half a meter long, and erect or decumbent in form. The Oregon plant is colonial with a branching caudex sending up several stems, and is severely threatened. The inflorescence may contain many flower heads with white or blue-tinged ray florets that may dry pinkish. The California plant is not colonial and the caudex branches little or not at all. The inflorescence contains no more than 3 heads. The florets are white or pink-tinged.

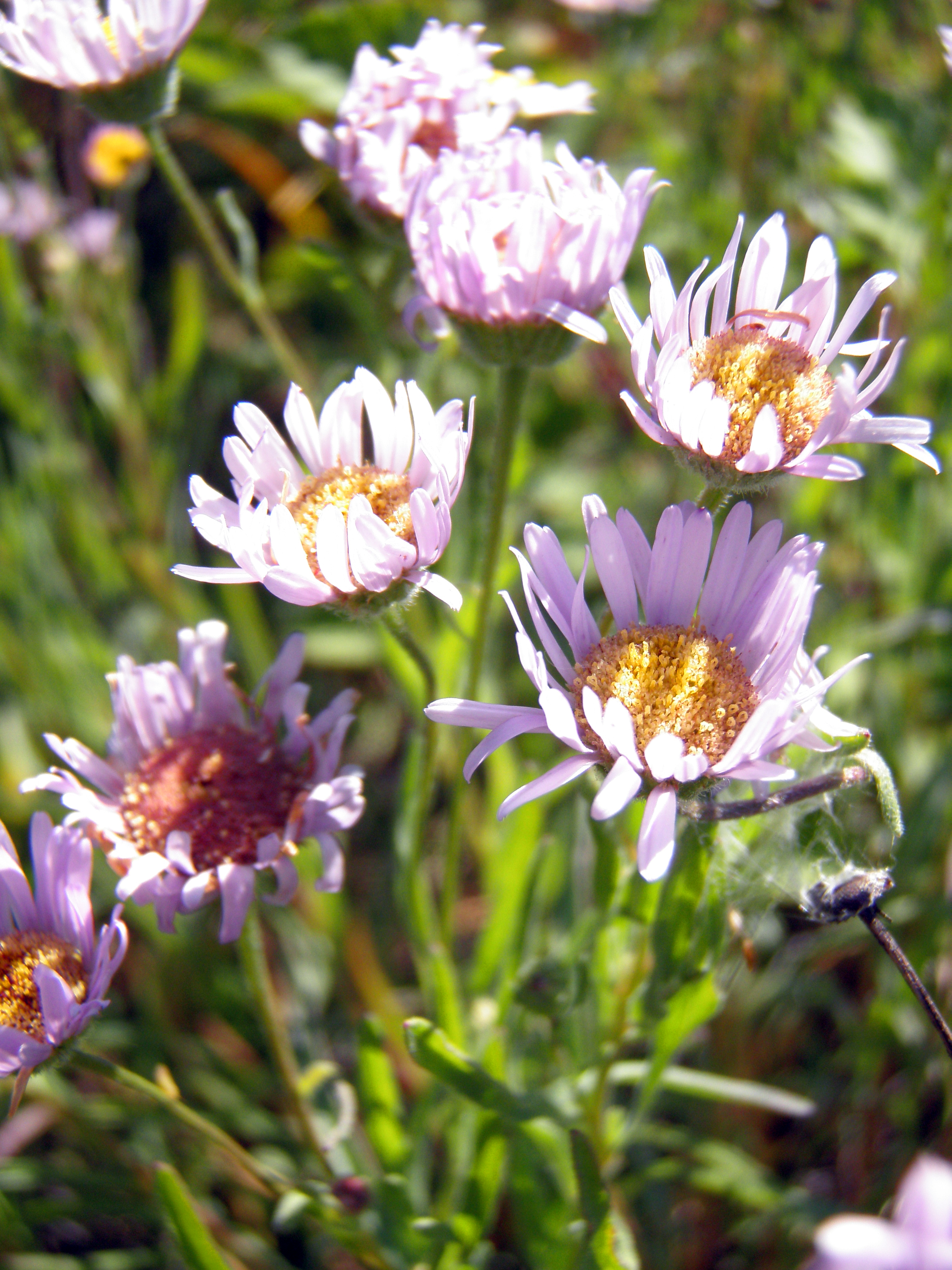
Erigeron decumbens var. decumbens growing in the West Eugene Wetland, Oregon
