= Ira S. Allison =

American geologist (1895-1990)

- Born: 16 March 1895; Grundy County, Illinois, US
- Died: 31 May 1990 (aged 95); Benton County, Oregon, United States
- Resting place: Hanover Cemetery; 38.70920°N 85.46440°W
- Education: Hanover College (AB); University of Chicago (Postgraduate); University of Minnesota (PhD)
- Known for: Studying fossils and geology of the Willamette Valley; Lake Allison
- Spouse: Sadie Crowe Gilchrist (1921-1986, her death)
- Children: 3
- Scientific career
- Fields: Geology; Paleontology; Biology
- Workplaces: Oregon State University University of Chicago University of Minnesota
- Thesis: The Giants Range Batholith of Minnesota (1925)

Ira Shimmin Allison (16 March 1895 – 31 May 1990), was an American geologist best known for studying the US state of Oregon's prehistoric lakes and waterways.

Allison is the namesake for Lake Allison, because he was the first person to identify and correlate Willamette silt soil in 1953 with soils at the former lake bed of Lake Lewis in eastern Washington.

== Personal life ==
Ira Allison was born on March 16, 1895, in Gardner, Illinois to John and Eva (né Shimmin) Allison, the fourth of seven siblings. His mother died when he was 13, and his father remarried to Margaret Elizabeth Phillips, with whom his father had three more children.

During World War I, from 1917 until 1919 Allison served as a Sergeant for the United States Army Medical Department. In 1921 he married his lifelong partner, Sadie Gilchrist in San Francisco, California. In 1928 he moved to Corvallis, Oregon, where he resided until his death.

He died of natural causes at his home in Corvallis, Oregon at the age of 95. He was buried in his home state of Illinois.

== Academia ==
Allison's started working at the University of Minnesota in 1920 as an assistant professor, teaching until 1928 and receiving a doctorate in Geology in 1924/5. In addition, he worked at the University of Chicago as an instructor in 1922 and 1923.

Allison worked at the Oregon State College from 1928 through 1965, and served as the chair of the Geology Department from 1950 until 1960. During this time he authored several different papers about the geological history of Oregon. In 1939, he performed a survey of Pleistocene lakes in south-central Oregon with three students from OSC. Some of his other references to the prehistoric lakes of Oregon include a 1945 article published in Geological Society of America Bulletin. about Summer Lake, and a later correction to that paper in 1966 published in the same journal. He participated as part of the leadership of the 8th annual biology colloquium.

After his retirement from OSC, he co-authored the 7th edition of McGraw Hill Education's Geology: The Science of a Changing Earth with David F. Palmer, published in 1980.
