= Erratic Rock State Natural Site =

State park near Salem, Oregon

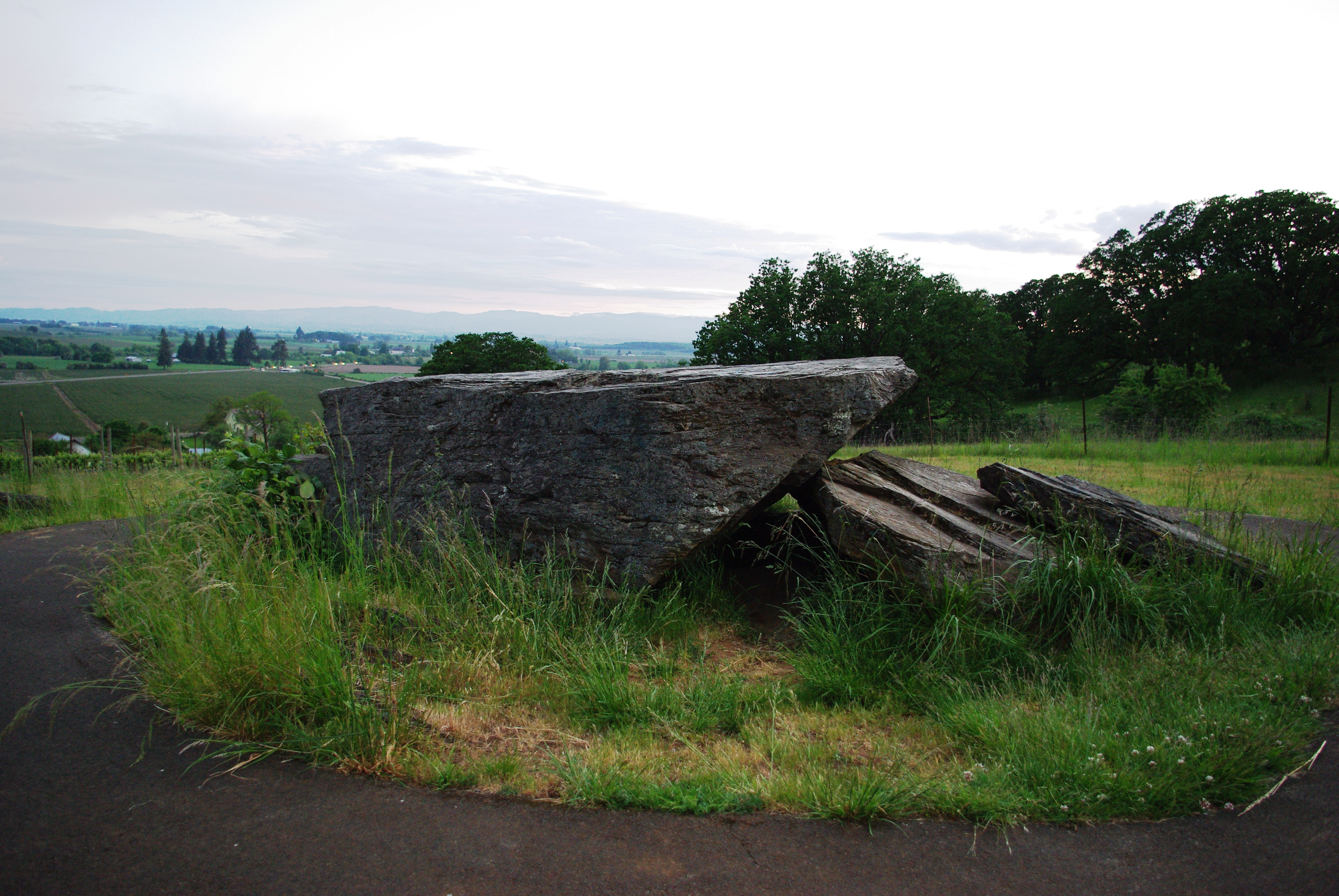
- Erratic rock with Yamhill Valley in background

- Location within Oregon Location within the United States
- Type: Public, state
- Location: Yamhill County, OregonUSA
- Nearest city: McMinnville
- Coordinates: 45°08′24″N 123°17′35″W
- Area: 4.4 acres (2 ha)
- Operator: Oregon Parks and Recreation Department
- Status: Day use only

Erratic Rock State Natural Site is a state park in the Willamette Valley of Oregon, United States. Featuring a 40-short-ton (36 t) glacial erratic from the Missoula Floods, the small park sits atop a foothill of the Northern Oregon Coast Range in Yamhill County between Sheridan and McMinnville off Oregon Route 18. The day-use-only park is owned and maintained by the Oregon Parks and Recreation Department.

== History ==
Purchased from the Duerst and Ramsby families in 1956, the park was originally named the Erratic Rock Wayside. In 1996, it was one of the state parks selected for closure due to budget problems. The Oregon Legislative Assembly came up with funding to avoid the closure. The park received a new historical marker along the road in June 2005 in a ceremony featuring state senator Gary George.

== Location ==
Located off Oregon 18, Erratic Rock State Natural Site lies midway between Sheridan to the west and McMinnville to the east.

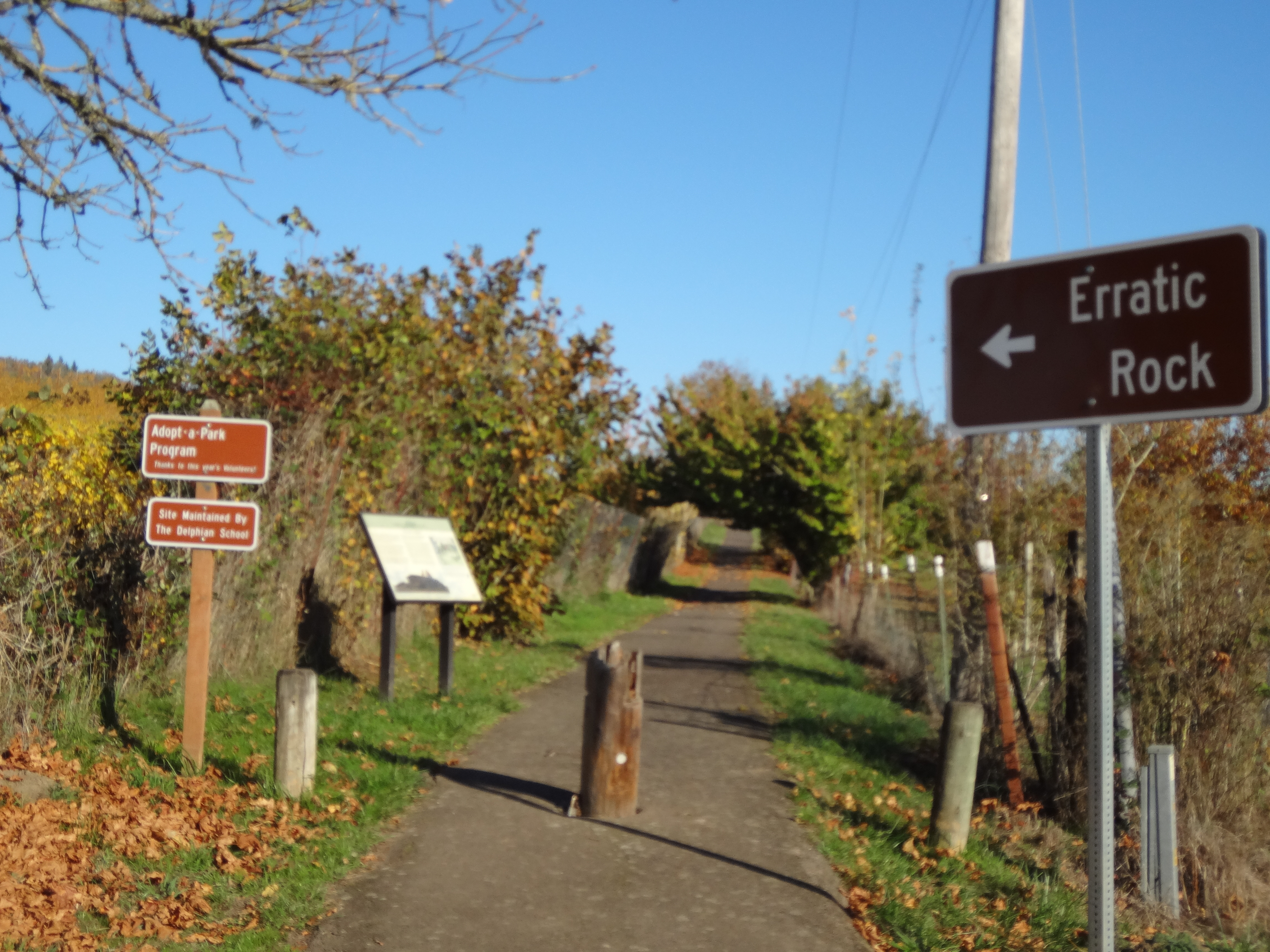
Erratic Rock Trail Image

== Geology ==
The pre-historic Missoula floods began in western Montana fifteen to twenty-thousand years ago. These large floods altered the landscape of the Columbia River valley and flooded the Willamette Valley. Many rocks were transported down the Columbia encased in icebergs and deposited from Montana through Idaho, Washington, and Oregon when the flood waters receded and the ice melted.

One of these 40-short-ton (36 t) erratics was deposited on a 250-foot (76 m) tall hill in the Yamhill Valley portion of the Willamette Valley.

Geologically, the rock comes from Canada and is the largest glacial erratic rock in the Willamette Valley. The rock is argillite believed to be 600 million years old and originally part of the sea-floor. It is also the only rock of its type outside of Canada.

== Plants and Wildlife ==
The Pacific Northwest climate allows for many diverse species of plants and animals to thrive.

Along with the flora and fauna indigenous to Oregon in general, the ones that are more specific to Yamhill county are categorized as wildlife species of the northwest region. This list contains animals in four different categories including amphibians, birds, mammals, and reptiles. Surprisingly enough, Wolverines have also recently been discovered in the Oregon territory as well, though their populations seem to be very small.

=== Oregon Conservation Efforts ===
The ODFW in Yamhill county is taking necessary steps toward the conservation of some of the indigenous plant and animal species. Some of the plants and animals listed on the endangered species are: the marbled murrelet (Brachyramphus marmoratus), the Northern Spotted Owl (Strix occidentalis caurina). Some of the endangered plants are, the Willamette daisy (Erigeron decumbens var. decumbens), the Kincaid's Lupine (Lupinus sulphureus ssp. Kincaidii), and the Nelson's Checker-Mallow(Sidalcea nelsoniana), to name a few.

For people interested in getting more involved in nature conservation for Oregon, more information can be found online. For a map of other regionally recognized places to view wildlife, visit the ODFW's wildlife viewing.

== Hobbies and exercise ==
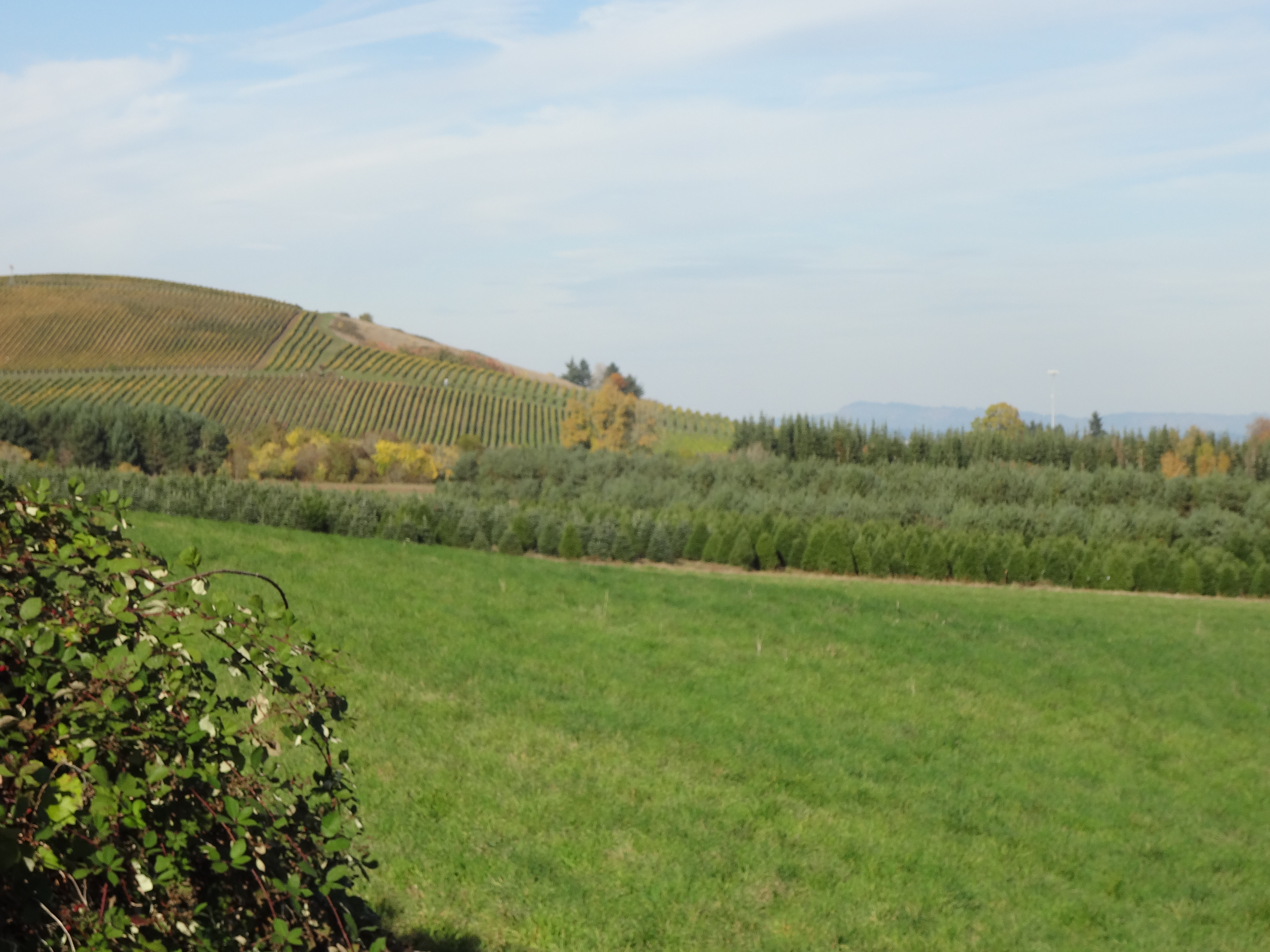
The view of vineyards from Erratic Rock

There is a 0.2 mile (320 m) easy hike along a paved trail to the top of the hill past a vineyard and orchard. It is relatively level with a gradual incline, until the last 100 m which is decidedly steeper. The rock sits at the end of the path, just over the incline.

The Erratic Park area also provides a venue for participating in some of the more popular hobbies related to the area. The hobbies include birding, butterfly collecting, photography, and geocaching.

=== Birding ===
Birdwatchers will find a lot of resources for their hobby in Yamhill county. There are a number of bird watching sites in Yamhill county, and Erratic is one of them. For a complete list of popularly viewed Oregon birds, see the Oregon Birds checklist online. For more information on additional connection opportunities and notifications on rare bird alerts, more information is online.

=== Butterfly collecting ===
Butterfly collectors will find many different species of butterflies in the Erratic area. Some of the species include, swallowtails (Papilioninae), parnassians (Parnassiinae), whites (Pierinae), sulphurs (Coliadinae), and more. A butterfly species, the Fender's blue butterfly, can also be viewed in this area. It is, however, on the endangered species list, so should not be collected. A large collection of indigenous Oregon butterflies can be seen at the Jackson Bottom Wetlands Preserve to serve as a documentation of everything Oregon has to offer. Collection of animals and plants is not permitted within Oregon's state parks.

=== Photography ===
The opportunities for photography vary from nature-focused to landscape.

=== Geocaching ===
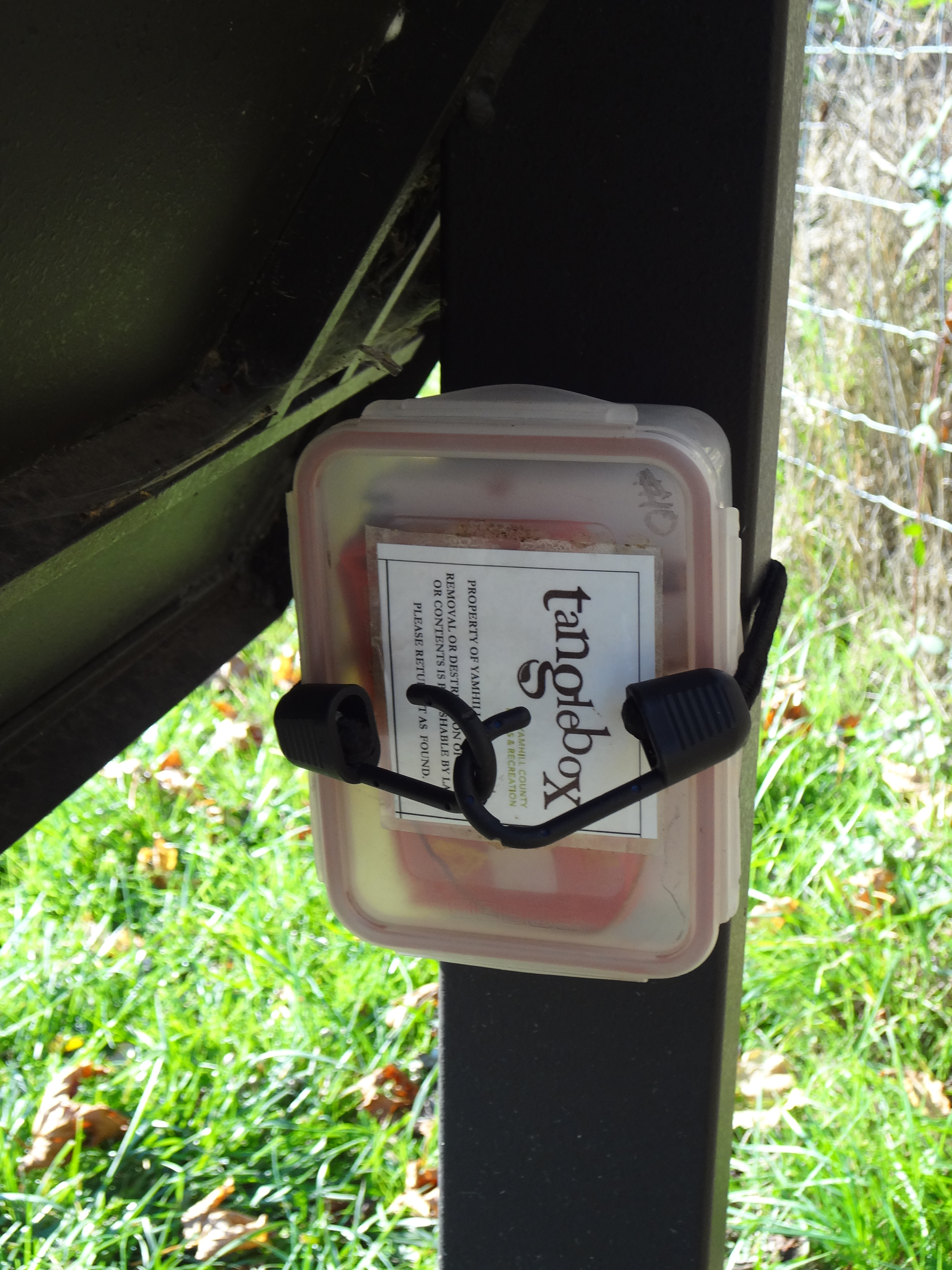
Tanglebox

Geocaching is an outdoor recreational treasure hunt. Cache availability and sizes are dependent on those who place and maintain them. Erratic Rock State Park features at least one traditional size cache. Erratic Park is a participant to the geocaching alternative sport, Tangleboxing, which was created and is hosted by Yamhill County and City of McMinnville Parks and Recreation. Tanglebox is an outdoor summertime treasure hunt. Tangleboxes have been hidden in eleven different Yamhill Park sites. The tanglebox is clearly labeled, but hidden.

== Tourism ==
In addition to the boulder, the hilltop features views of the Oregon Coast Range and the valley, including vineyards and farms. There is a 0.2-mile (320 m) hike along a paved trail to the top of the hill past a vineyard and orchard that provides bird watching opportunities. Operated by the state parks department, the park is a day-use-only facility that includes an interpretive sign and picnic table at the 4.4-acre (2 ha) park.
Erratic Rock is situated in the Yamhill County, Oregon Winery district. There are numerous places for wine tasting for Oregon wine within a 10-mile radius.

== See also ==
- List of Oregon state parks
