= Suplee =

Suplee is a surname. Notable people with the surname include:

- Ethan Suplee (born 1976), American actor
- Henry Harrison Suplee (1856 – after 1943), American publisher of Cassier's Magazine
