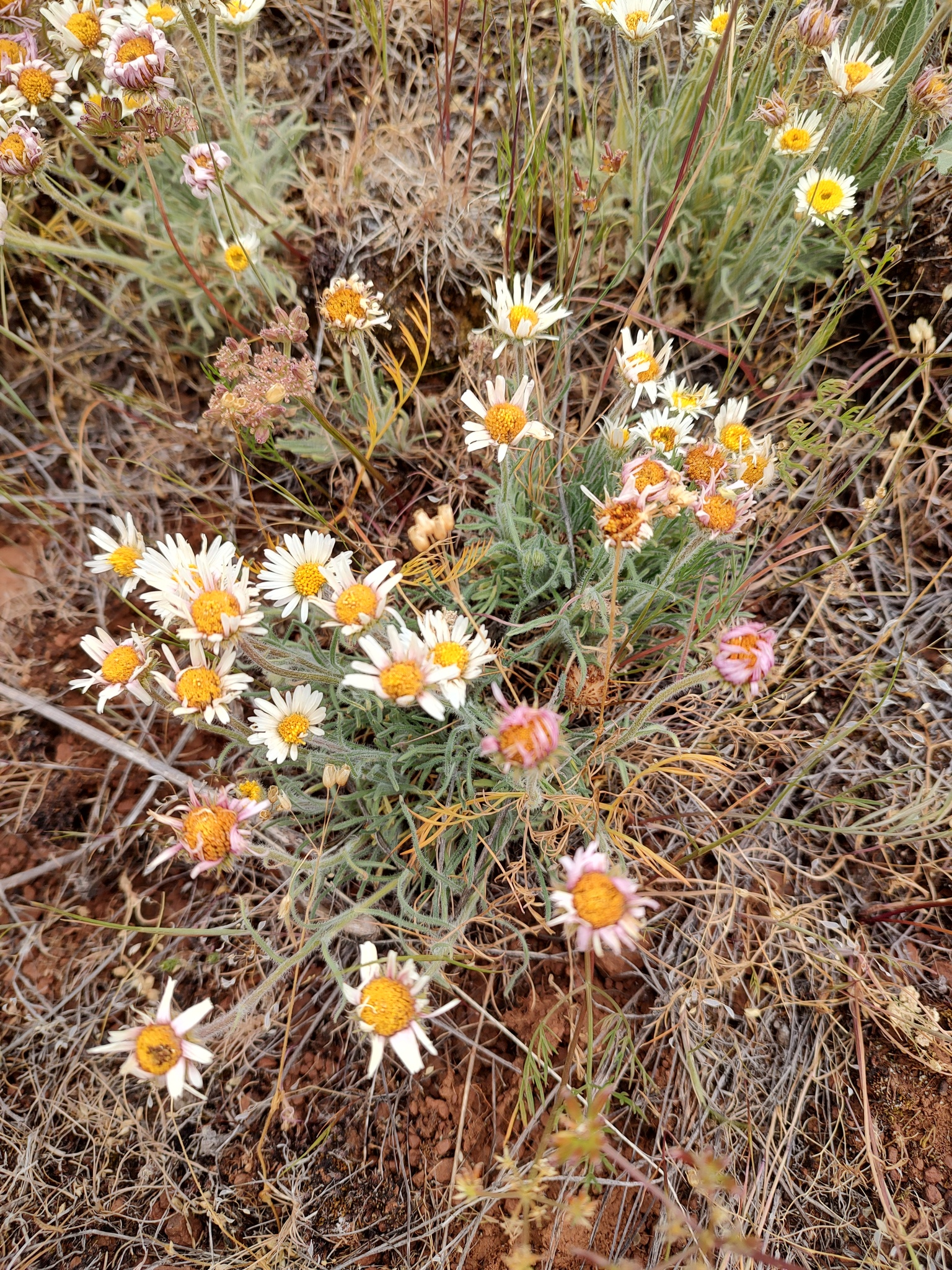

Scientific classification
- Kingdom: Plantae
- Clade: Tracheophytes
- Clade: Angiosperms
- Clade: Eudicots
- Clade: Asterids
- Order: Asterales
- Family: Asteraceae
- Genus: Erigeron
- Species: E. disparipilus

Binomial name
- Erigeron disparipilus Cronquist

Synonyms
- Erigeron davisii (Cronquist) G.L.Nesom; Erigeron engelmannii subsp. davisii Cronquist; Erigeron engelmannii var. davisii (Cronquist) Cronquist

= Erigeron disparipilus =

Species of flowering plant

Erigeron disparipilus is a North American species of flowering plants in the family Asteraceae known by the common name white cushion fleabane. It is found in Oregon, Washington, and Idaho in the northwestern United States.

Erigeron disparipilus is a perennial herb up to 12 cm (4.8 inches) tall. Most of the leaves are generally clustered around the bases of the stems. Each stem generally has only one flower head, with 30–60 white ray florets surrounding numerous yellow disc florets.
