= Umpqua Group =

Geologic formation in Oregon, United States

- Stratigraphic range: Paleogene
- Type: Group

Location
- Region: Oregon
- Country: United States

The Umpqua Group is a geologic group in Oregon. It preserves fossils dating back to the Paleogene period.

== See also ==
- List of fossiliferous stratigraphic units in Oregon
- Paleontology in Oregon
