= Willamette Valley =

Valley in the Pacific Northwest region of the US

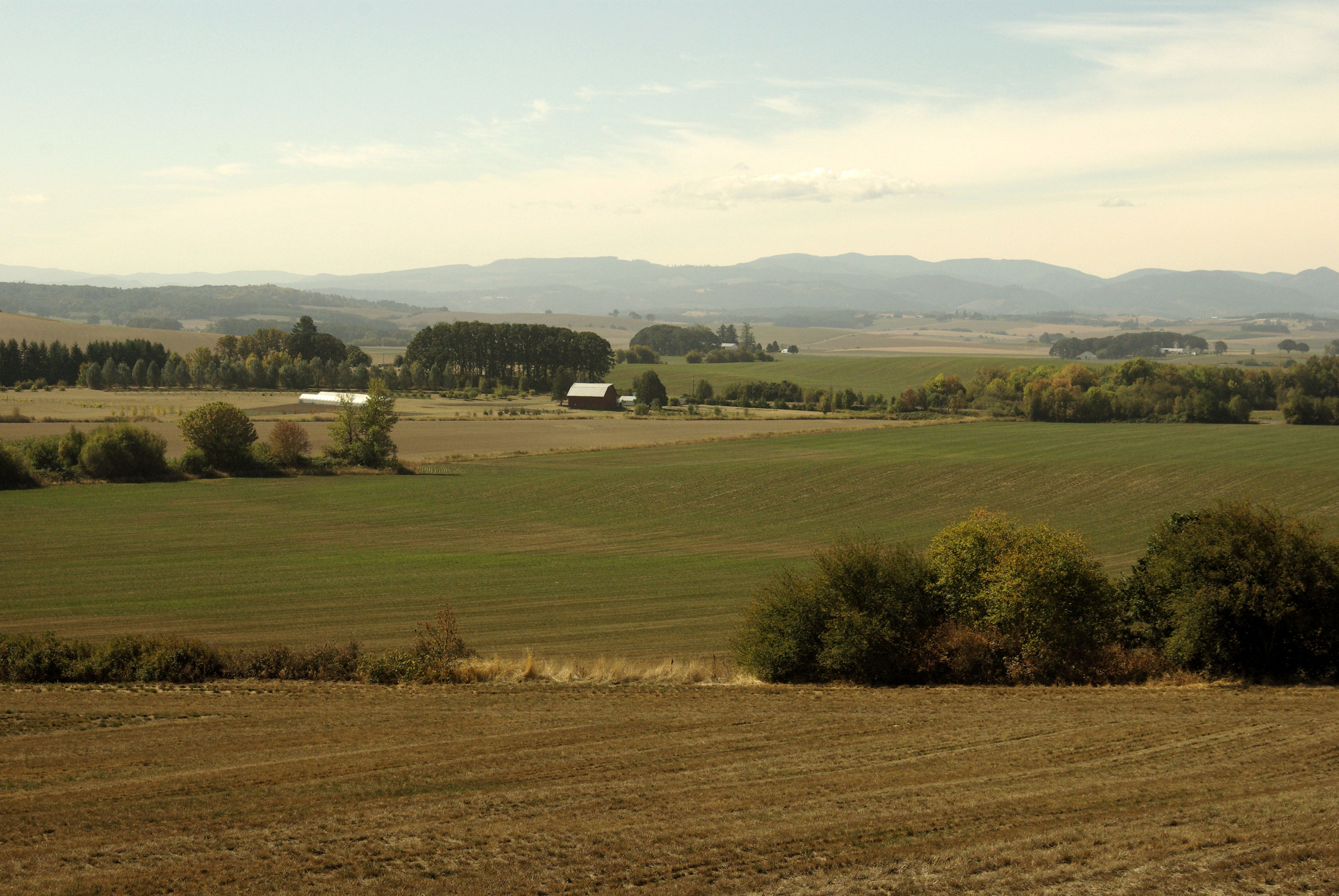
- Farmscape in northern Polk County

- The Willamette Valley contains most of Oregon's population; it extends from the Portland metro area in the north to Eugene in the south.

Geography
- Location: United States, Oregon
- Borders on: Cascade Range (East); Oregon Coast Range (West); Calapooya Mountains (South)
- Coordinates: 44.9°N 123.1°W
- Rivers: Willamette River

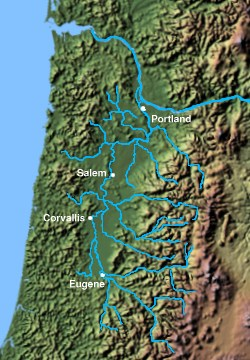
Willamette Valley basin

The Willamette Valley (/wɪˈlæmɪt/ wil-AM-it) is a 150-mile-long (240 km) valley in Oregon, in the Pacific Northwest region of the United States. The Willamette River flows the entire length of the valley and is surrounded by mountains on three sides: the Cascade Range to the east, the Oregon Coast Range to the west, and the Calapooya Mountains to the south. The valley is synonymous with the cultural and political heart of Oregon and is home to approximately 70 percent of its population including the five largest cities in the state: Portland, Eugene, Salem, Gresham, and Hillsboro.

The valley's numerous waterways, particularly the Willamette River, are vital to the economy of Oregon, as they continuously deposit highly fertile alluvial soils across its broad, flat plain. A massively productive agricultural area, the valley was widely publicized in the 1820s as a "promised land of flowing milk and honey". Throughout the 19th century, it was the destination of choice for the ox-drawn wagon trains of emigrants who made the perilous journey along the Oregon Trail.

Today, the valley is often considered synonymous with "Oregon Wine Country", as it contains more than 19,000 acres (7,700 ha) of vineyards and 500+ wineries.

== Geology ==
Much of the Willamette's fertility is derived from a series of massive ice-age floods that came from Lake Missoula in Montana and scoured across Eastern Washington, sweeping its topsoil down the Columbia River Gorge. When floodwaters met log- and ice-jams at Kalama in southwest Washington, the water caused a backup that filled the entire Willamette Valley to a depth of 300 to 400 feet (91 to 122 m) above current sea level. Some geologists suggest that the valley flooded in this manner multiple times during the last ice age. (If floodwaters of that magnitude covered Portland (elevation 20 ft or 6.1 m) in 2010, only the tops of the West Hills, Mount Tabor, Rocky Butte, Kelley Butte and Mount Scott would be visible, as would only some of the city's tallest skyscrapers.) Elevations for other cities in the valley are Newberg at 175 ft (53 m), Oregon City at 138 ft (42 m), McMinnville at 157 ft (48 m), Salem at 154 ft (47 m), Corvallis at 235 ft (72 m), and Eugene at 430 ft (130 m). The lake gradually drained away, leaving layered sedimentary soils on the valley floor to a height of about 180 to 200 ft (55 to 61 m) above current sea level throughout the Tualatin, Yamhill, and Willamette valleys.

Geologists have come to refer to the resulting lake as Lake Allison, named for Oregon State University geologist Ira S. Allison, who first described Willamette Silt soil in 1953 and noted its similarity to soils on the floor of former Lake Lewis in Eastern Washington. Allison is also known for his work in the 1930s documenting the hundreds of non-native boulders (called erratics) washed down by the floods, rafted on icebergs and deposited on the valley bottom and in a ring around the lower hills surrounding the Willamette Valley. One of the most prominent of these is the Bellevue Erratic, just off Oregon Route 18 west of McMinnville.

It is also believed that the Willamette Meteorite was rafted by flood and ice to the location near West Linn where it was discovered and venerated by the Clackamas people up until its discovery by settlers in 1902, prompting a lawsuit regarding its ownership that reached the Oregon Supreme Court in July 1903.

== Geography ==
The valley may be loosely defined as the broad plain of the Willamette, bounded on the west by the Oregon Coast Range and on the east by the Cascade Range. It is bounded on the south by the Calapooya Mountains, which separate the headwaters of the Willamette from the Umpqua River valley about 25 miles (40 km) south of Hidden Valley. From an ecological perspective, it continues a little north of the Columbia River into southwestern Washington, up to the Lewis River, but the Willamette River terminates where it flows into the Columbia and generally this is considered the northern border of the basin. Interstate 5 (I-5) runs the length of the valley, linking its major communities.

Because of differing cultural and political interests, the Portland metropolitan area and Tualatin River valley are sometimes not included in the local use of the term, though both are located within the geographical valley. Additionally, the east slopes of the Coast Ranges and the west slopes of the Cascade Range from Oakridge to Detroit Lake can be considered part of the Willamette Valley in a cultural sense, despite being mountainous areas.

Cities in the valley include, from south to north, Cottage Grove, Eugene and Springfield (the two cities form a single populated area, separated in places only by I-5 and/or the McKenzie River), Corvallis, Albany, Dallas, Salem, Keizer, McMinnville, and Hillsboro. Parts of other counties lie within the valley (from south to north): Douglas, Lane, Linn, Benton, Polk, Marion, Yamhill, and Washington counties. Sometimes the area around Albany and Corvallis and surrounding Benton and Linn counties is referred to locally as the Mid-Valley. Marion, Polk, and other counties are sometimes included in the definition of the Mid-Valley.

== Climate ==
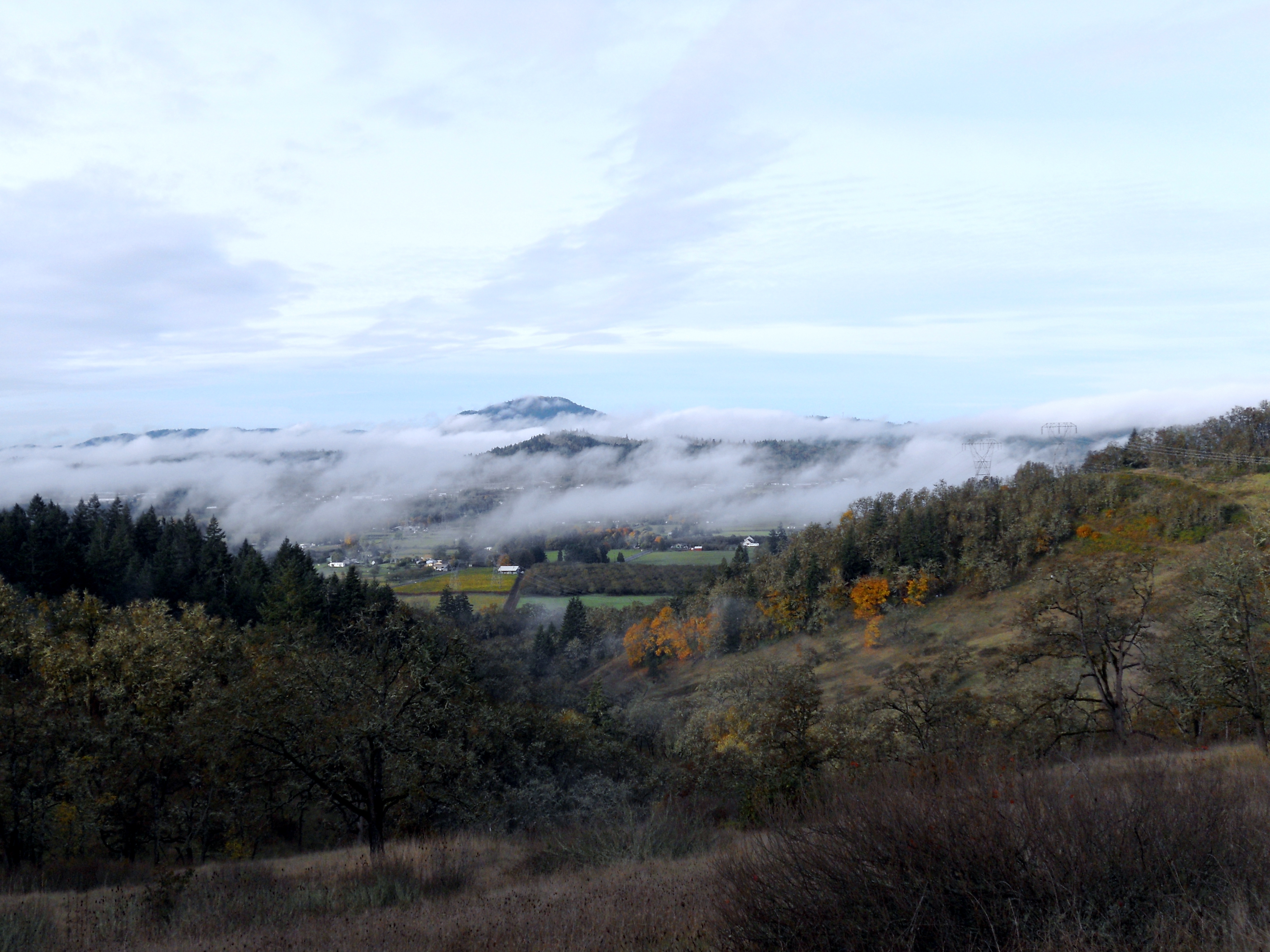
Light fog in the southern valley

The climate of the Willamette Valley is a mix of Mediterranean (Köppen Csb) and oceanic (Köppen Cfb) influences. The Köppen climate classification system considers it Mediterranean, but compared to a true Mediterranean climate it is cooler and moister, with a longer rainy season. The main climatic features are moderate temperatures and frequent cloudiness and rains, except in summer when the northward expansion of the North Pacific High creates generally sunny and warm weather.

Winters are consistently wet and cloudy, and often foggy, but quite mild. Although night frosts are common, the temperature almost always rises above the freezing point in the daytime. Snow occurs on occasion, but accumulations are normally light, and in some winters no snow whatsoever falls. Very cold temperatures are atypical; the temperature very rarely falls below 20 °F (−7 °C), and readings of 5 °F (−15 °C) or lower occur only about once every 25 years. Summers are characterized by warm, sunny afternoons with little or no humidity, and cool evenings. Sometimes, heat waves can occur, with temperatures rising above 90 °F (32 °C) and occasionally even reaching 100 °F (38 °C), but the nights usually bring relief. More recently, there have been heat waves in the area that reach higher than 110 °F (43 °C).

Precipitation varies considerably across the valley and is closely correlated with elevation. Annual totals range from 36 inches (910 mm) at the lowest elevations to more than 80 inches (2,000 mm) in the foothills. Eugene, at the southern end of the valley, is 425 feet (130 m) above sea level and receives 46 inches (1,200 mm) per year. Conversely, at the northern end of the valley, Portland is 50 feet (15 m) above sea level and receives only 36 inches (910 mm) per year. Most rainfall occurs from October to May, and it tends to be heaviest between November and January, when disturbances coming from the Pacific Ocean are at their most intense. Growing seasons are long, averaging 150 to 180 days per year in the lowlands to about 110 to 130 days at elevations above 800 feet (240 m).

Severe storms of any kind are rare, although snow and ice storms can sometimes occur when surface low pressure systems move south along the coast, inducing offshore flow which advects cold air from the Columbia Basin westward through the Columbia River Gorge, filling the valley to the north of the surface low track. Weather systems sometimes bring high winds to the northern region of the valley. Average cloud cover can exceed 70 percent in winter but drops to less than 15 percent in summer. Tornadoes are rare, but do happen a few times a year with minimal damage.

== Agriculture ==
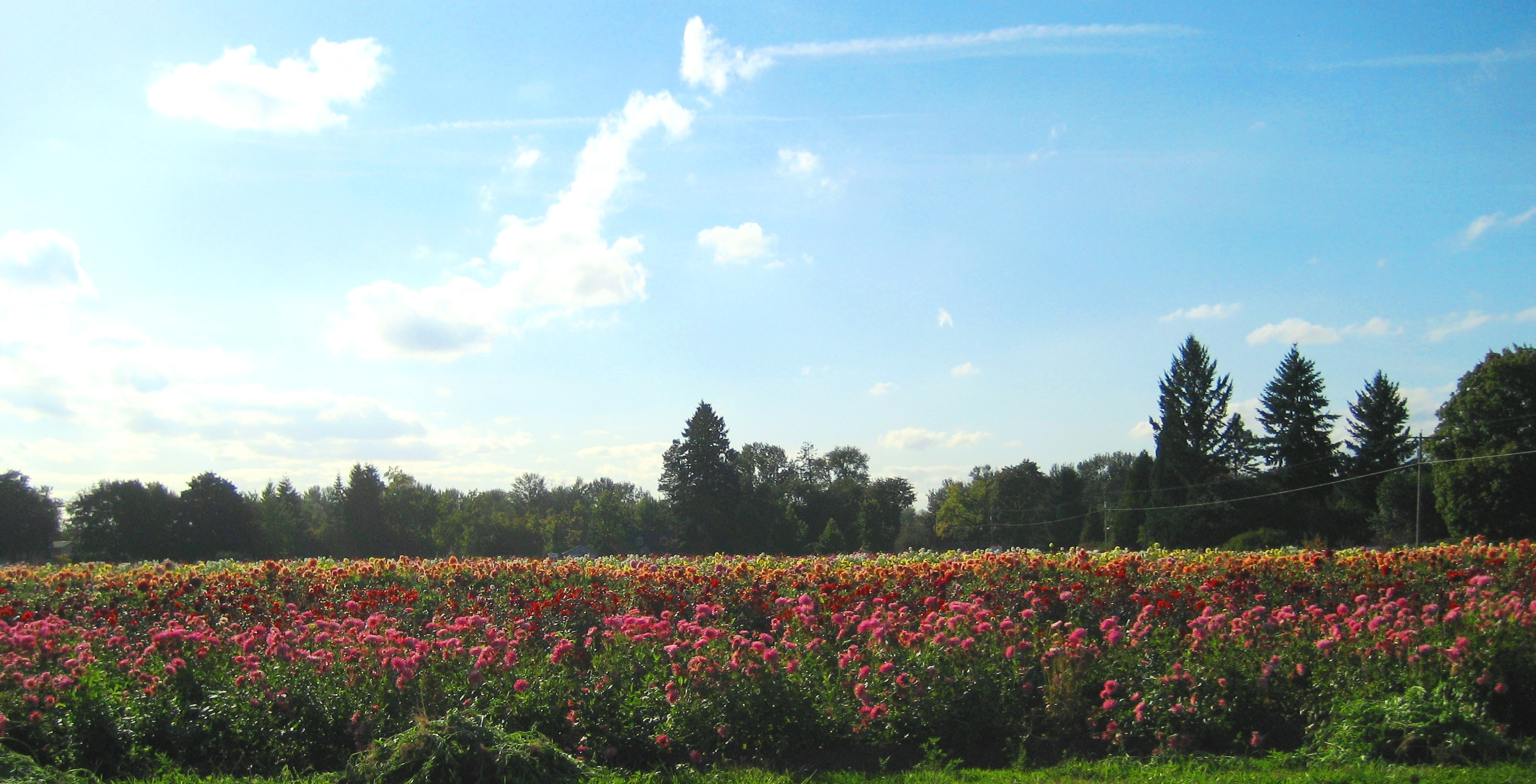
A field of Dahlias near Canby

The agricultural richness of the valley is partly due to the Missoula Floods that inundated the valley approximately 40 times between 15,000 and 13,000 years ago at the end of the last ice age. The floods were caused by the periodic rupturing of the ice dam of Glacial Lake Missoula, the waters of which swept down the Columbia River and flooded the Willamette Valley as far south as Eugene. The floodwaters carried rich volcanic and glacial soil from Eastern Washington, which was deposited across the valley floor when the waters subsided. The soil in the Willamette Valley is about 1/2 mile (1 km) deep in some areas.

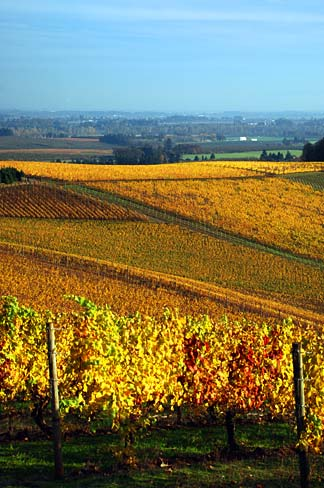
Fall grape vines in a Willamette Valley vineyard

In the cool moist climate of the Willamette valley, over 170 different crop and livestock items are produced, including grass and legume seeds, tree fruits and nuts, wine grapes, berries, vegetables, nursery, Christmas trees, and field crops such as wheat, oats, mint and hops, hay, livestock, and poultry. The valley produces most of the cool-season forage and turf grass, Christmas trees, and hazelnuts sold in North America. It is also noted for its hops, which are widely used in craft beer and microbreweries throughout the US.

In recent decades, the valley has also become a major wine producer, with multiple American Viticultural Areas of its own. With a cooler climate than California, the gently rolling hills surrounding the Willamette are home to some of the best (and most expensive) Pinot noir in the world, as well as a high-quality Pinot gris. Although this distinction is not officially recognized, many wine connoisseurs further divide the Willamette Valley into northern and southern regions, the dividing line being the approximate latitude of Salem (approximately 45° north latitude). Not all portions of the Willamette Valley are suitable for vineyards, however, and the largest concentration of wineries is found west of the Willamette River, on the leeward slopes of the Coast Range, or among the numerous river and stream valleys created by Willamette River tributaries. By far, the largest concentration of wineries is in Yamhill County.

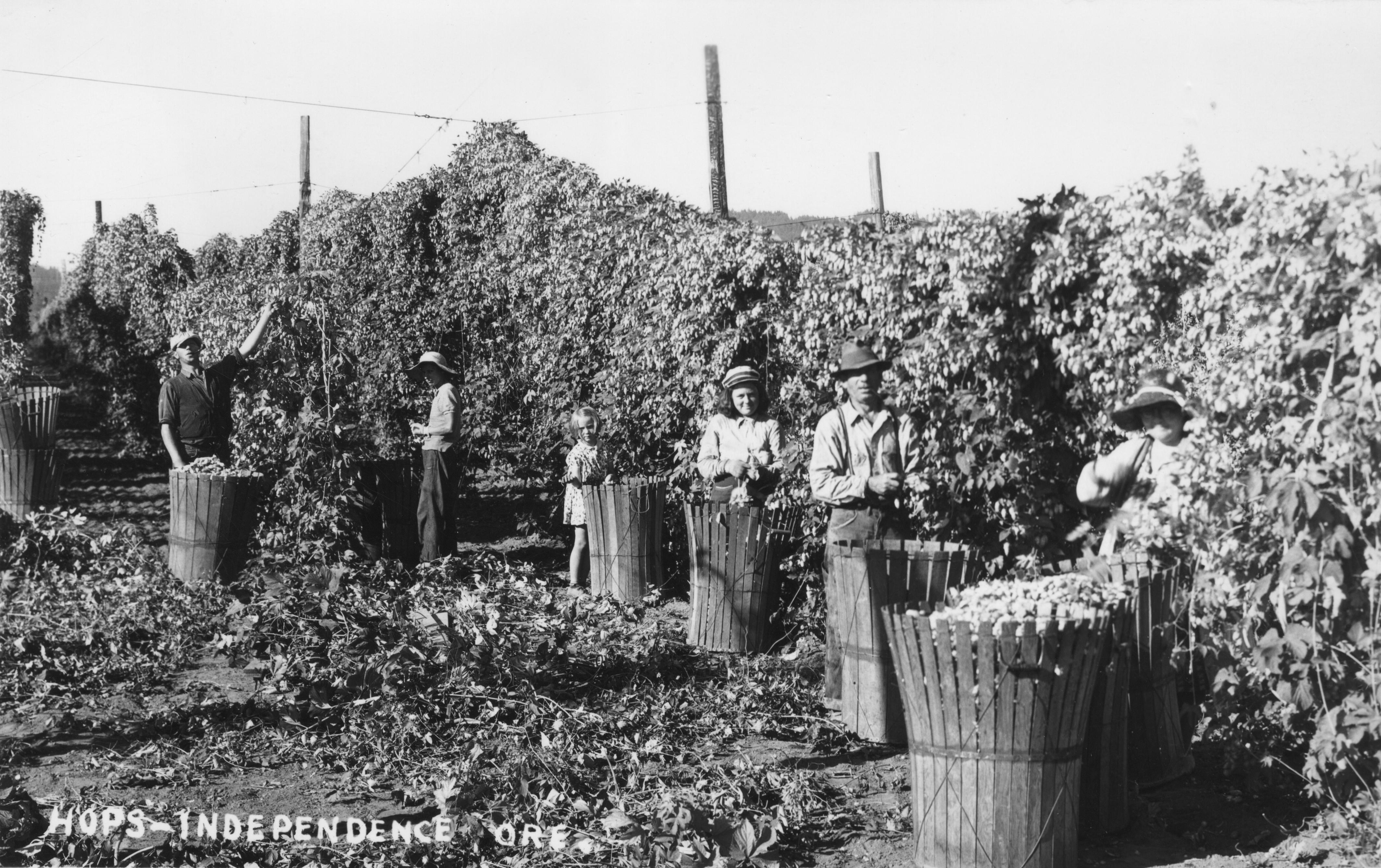
Harvesting hops near Independence, Oregon, c. 1940

Grass farmers have been burning fields, as part of their production, since the 1940s. The smoke is often irritating to residents; in 1988 it caused a 23-car pileup on I-5. Over the years, several pieces of legislation have limited the amount of burning permitted. With the passage of a bill championed by legislator Paul Holvey in the 2009 session, burning has been banned since the summer of 2010, with the exception of an area of about 15,000 acres (60 km^{2}) with steep terrain and certain species. (At its peak in the 1980s, about 250,000 acres (1,000 km^{2}) were burned each year.)

The marionberry, a cross between Chehalem and Olallie blackberries, was bred at Oregon State University as part of a berry-developing partnership with the US Department of Agriculture that dates back to the early 1900s. It is named for Marion County in the Willamette Valley, where most of the field trials took place. When the berry was introduced in the 1950s, it was widely hailed as the most delicious blackberry commercial cultivar around. Even today, people rave over its tart-yet-sweet flavor, described as a cross between raspberries and blackberries. (Though there is some raspberry in its DNA, the red fruits are more like a genetic great-great-grandparent to the marionberry.)

== Ecology ==
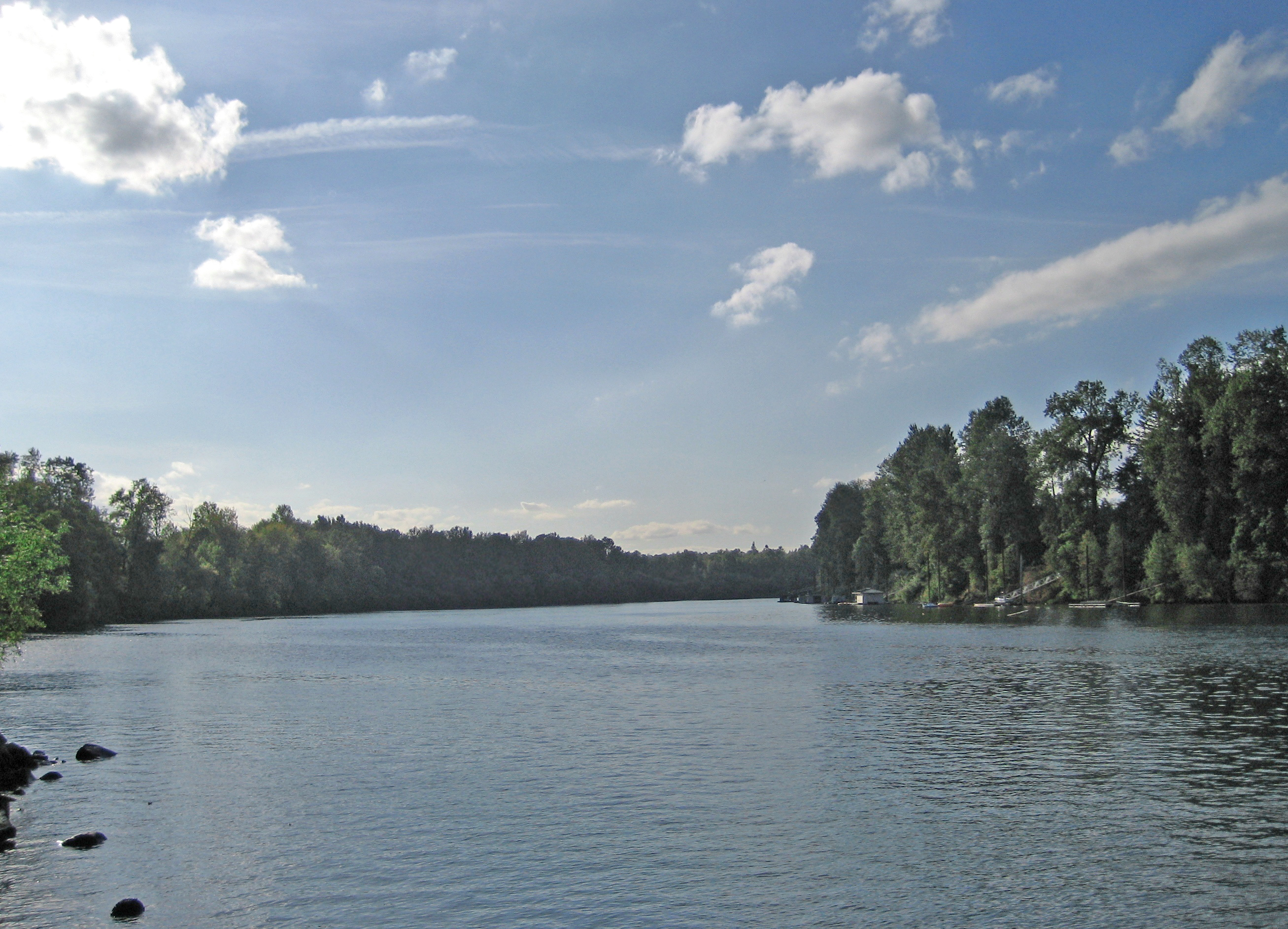
The Willamette River in the northern section of the valley

The Willamette Valley is prone to periodic floods. Notable floods include the Great Flood of 1862, events in 1899, the Christmas flood of 1964, and the Willamette Valley flood of 1996. Part of its floodplain is a National Natural Landmark called the Willamette Floodplain.

Historically, the Willamette Valley forests were mostly an oak savanna—tall grasslands with scattered Garry oaks and groves of coast Douglas-fir. The river floodplains contained extensive wetlands, stands of willow, alder, and cottonwood, and gallery forests. This landscape was maintained by the Native American inhabitants of the valley who set frequent fires that encouraged the open grasslands and killed young trees. The American settlers of the region, since the 19th century, suppressed fires and converted much of the valley to agriculture, which has caused much of the former grassland and savanna to revert to closed-canopy forest. Less than one-tenth of one percent of the original savanna vegetation remains. The remaining enclaves include a section of Garry oak savanna preserved at Mount Pisgah Arboretum in Eugene. North Pacific Oak Woodland is a major forest alliance, extending through the Willamette Valley and southward to the Klamath Range of Northern California. Many of the soils are well-drained mesic.

== History ==
Human habitation in the Willamette Valley is estimated to have begun 16,000 B.P. Until recently, the valley was largely inhabited by bands of the Kalapuya tribe of Native Americans. Molala and Chinook peoples also have inhabited portions of the Willamette Valley since time immemorial. Sixteen thousand Kalapuyans are estimated to have populated the valley as recently as the early 19th century. Salmon, deer, and camas bulbs have provided primary food sources for the valley's first residents who used fire to encourage persistence of oak savanna. Oak trees have supplied another staple in the form of acorns which are leached, cooked, and eaten. Kalapuya, Chinook, and Molala peoples of the Willamette Valley currently are included among the confederated tribes that make up the Grand Ronde and Siletz Nations.

As many as 90% of the Kalapuya may have died as a result of an epidemic of "fever and ague" that hit the area between 1830 and 1833.

In the early 1850s, the US government coerced all of the Indigenous peoples of the Willamette Valley into removal from the valley, cession of all their lands and extinction of aboriginal title in the valley. They were rounded up and taken to the Grande Ronde Reservation, with a few being assigned to the Coast Indian Reservation, today the Siletz Reservation. Boarding schools were set up both on and off reservations, and children were forcibly taken from their parents to live at these schools, such as the Chemawa Indian School in Salem. Today, the people of the Confederated Tribes of the Grand Ronde Community of Oregon refer to their removal from the Willamette Valley as a Trail of Tears.

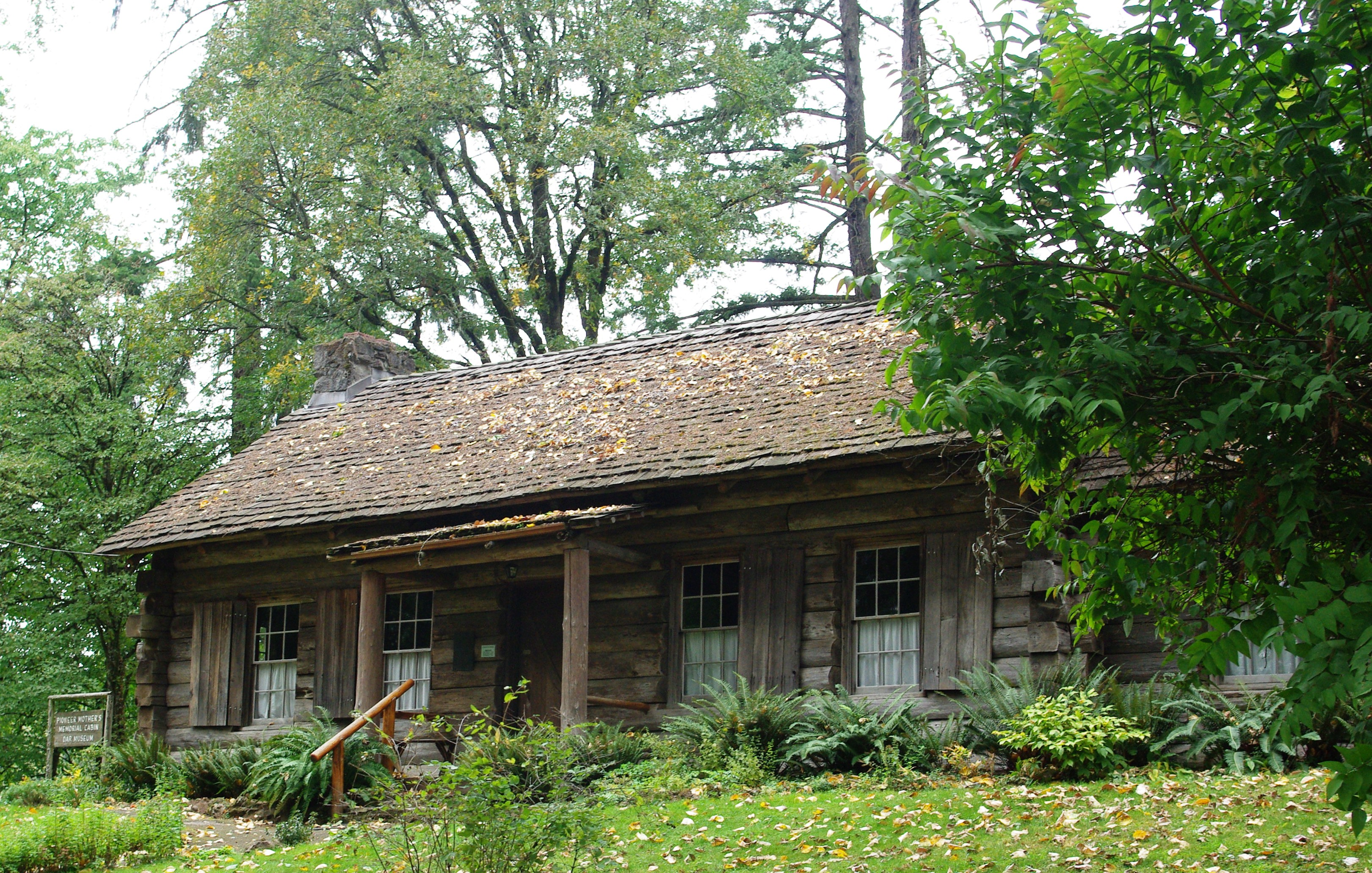
Pioneer cabin at Champoeg

After reports of the Lewis and Clark Expedition were published in about 1807, a small and steadily increasing stream of isolated pioneer groups began settling in the valley and improving routes from the east set up by fur traders and mountain men. From the 1841 Oregon Trail opening, when efforts over many years resulted in widening the fur traders' mule trails into a rough road just capable of carrying the width of a wagon, settlers charged into the region along the new trail and created new settlements centered about Oregon City as the early capital. They built settlements both before and after colonial powers had resolved a dispute among them about owning the region. So many settlers came that the valley led the way to achieving US statehood less than 16 years after it was claimed by the United States in 1846. A small part of the Willamette Valley ecoregion is in southwestern Washington around the city of Vancouver, which was once the site of an early colonial-era settlement—Fort Vancouver. The Willamette Valley—with its sawmills, lush productive farms, river transport network, and nearby timber and mineral resources—developed as a cultural and major commercial hub, as the Oregon Country became the Oregon Territory.

The Hudson's Bay Company controlled the fur trade in the valley and the rest of Oregon Country in the 1820s and 1830s from its Columbia District headquarters at Fort Vancouver. Joint US–British occupancy, in effect since the Treaty of 1818, ended in 1846 with the Oregon Treaty.

The Willamette Valley was connected to California's Central Valley by the Siskiyou Trail. The first European settlements in the valley were at Oregon City and Champoeg. The first institution of higher learning on the West Coast, today's Willamette University, was founded in the valley at Salem by Jason Lee, one of the many Oregon missionaries who settled in the valley.

== Sports ==
The Willamette Valley Jaguars of The Basketball League (TBL) have played in the area since 2024.

The Willamette Bearcats represent Willamette University across multiple NCAA Division III sports.

The Willamette Wolverines represent Willamette High School in Eugene, OR and have earned multiple OSAA Oregon high school state championships in boys track and field, boys cross country, cheerleading, and girls basketball.

University of Oregon, based in Eugene, have had sports teams in all sports. Most notably the Oregon Duck Football and Basketball teams.

== See also ==
- Jory (soil)
- Willamette Valley (ecoregion)
- Willamette Valley AVA (wine region)
