= Paleontology in Oregon =

Paleontological research in the U.S. state of Oregon

The location of the state of Oregon

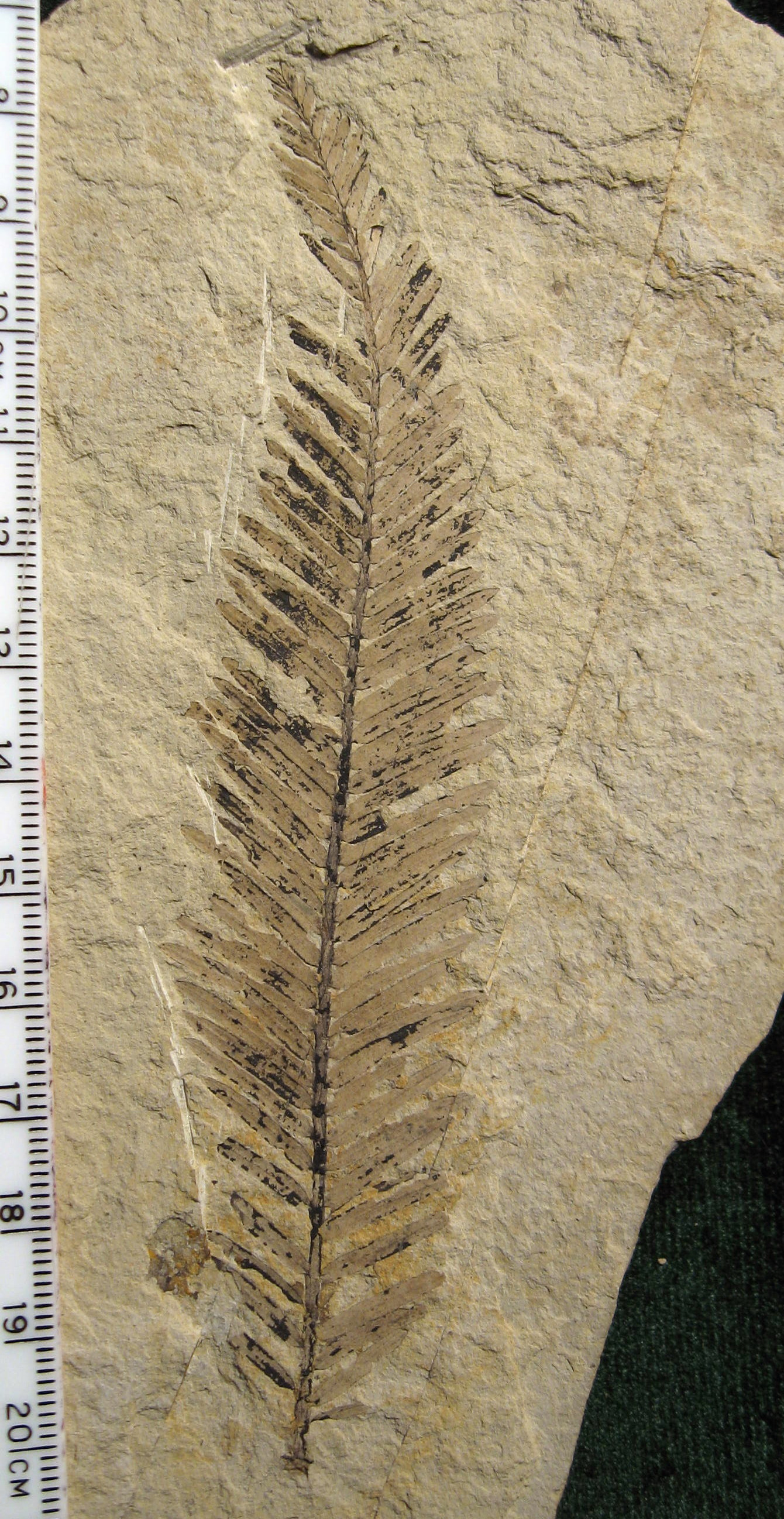
A Metasequoia occidentalis fossil, from the same species as Oregon's official state fossil

Paleontology in Oregon refers to paleontological research occurring within or conducted by people from the U.S. state of Oregon. Oregon's geologic record extends back approximately 400 million years ago to the Devonian period, before which time the state's landmass was likely submerged under water. Sediment records show that Oregon remained mostly submerged until the Paleocene period. The state's earliest fossil record includes plants, corals, and conodonts. Oregon was covered by seaways and volcanic islands during the Mesozoic era. Fossils from this period include marine plants, invertebrates, ichthyosaurs, pterosaurs, and traces such as invertebrate burrows. During the Cenozoic, Oregon's climate gradually cooled and eventually yielded the environments now found in the state. The era's fossils include marine and terrestrial plants, invertebrates, fish, amphibians, turtles, birds, mammals, and traces such as eggs and animal tracks.

Oregon has a long tradition of paleontological research. Local Native Americans devised myths to explain fossils. By the mid-19th century local fossils had come to the attention of formally trained scientists, and modern research has produced data on climate change and extinction.

The Oligocene dawn redwood Metasequoia occidentalis is the Oregon state fossil.

There are no known rocks in Oregon from Precambrian times. Geologists infer that the area now occupied by Oregon must have been submerged deep on the ocean floor during that period.

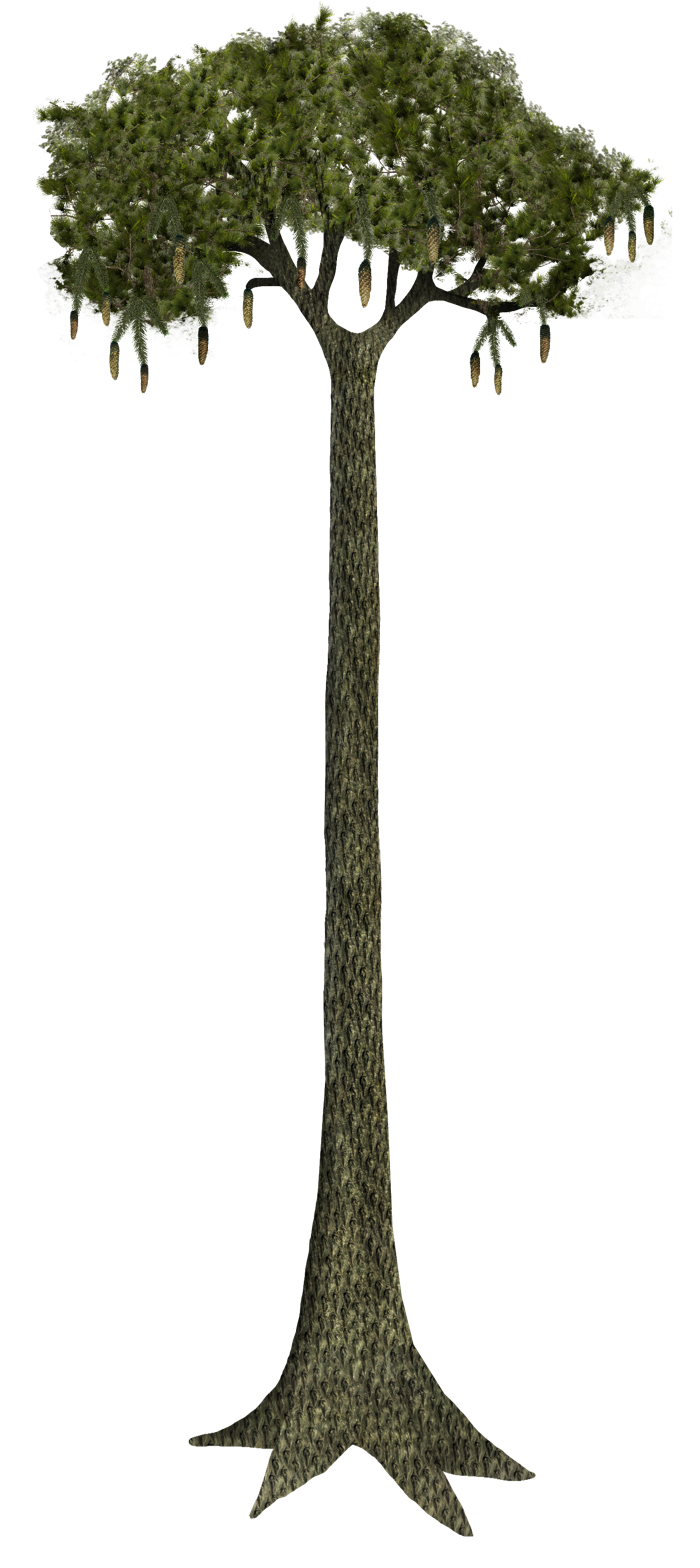
Artist's rendition of the scale tree genus Lepidodendron

== Paleozoic Era ==
Oregon's oldest known rock formations are found in the Blue Mountains and the Klamath Mountains. The state's oldest individual rock is a limestone near Suplee dated to nearly 400 million years ago, during the Devonian period of the Paleozoic era. These deposits include conodonts as well as extinct corals and brachiopods, indicating a shallow marine environment. Most of Oregon would remain under water until the Cenozoic era.

Starting in the Carboniferous period, a series of volcanic archipelagos formed in the region. Islands in these chains would have hosted warm, wet terrestrial environments. Fossils in Oregon's oldest floral assemblage, dating to the Late Carboniferous period, implies a lagoon ecosystem. Fossils in the assemblage include horsetails, ferns, scale trees, and conifer tree seeds. Formations of similar age also include shallow water invertebrates indicating that Oregon's volcanic islands were surrounded by coral reefs, which is consistent with Charles Darwin's theory of reef formation.

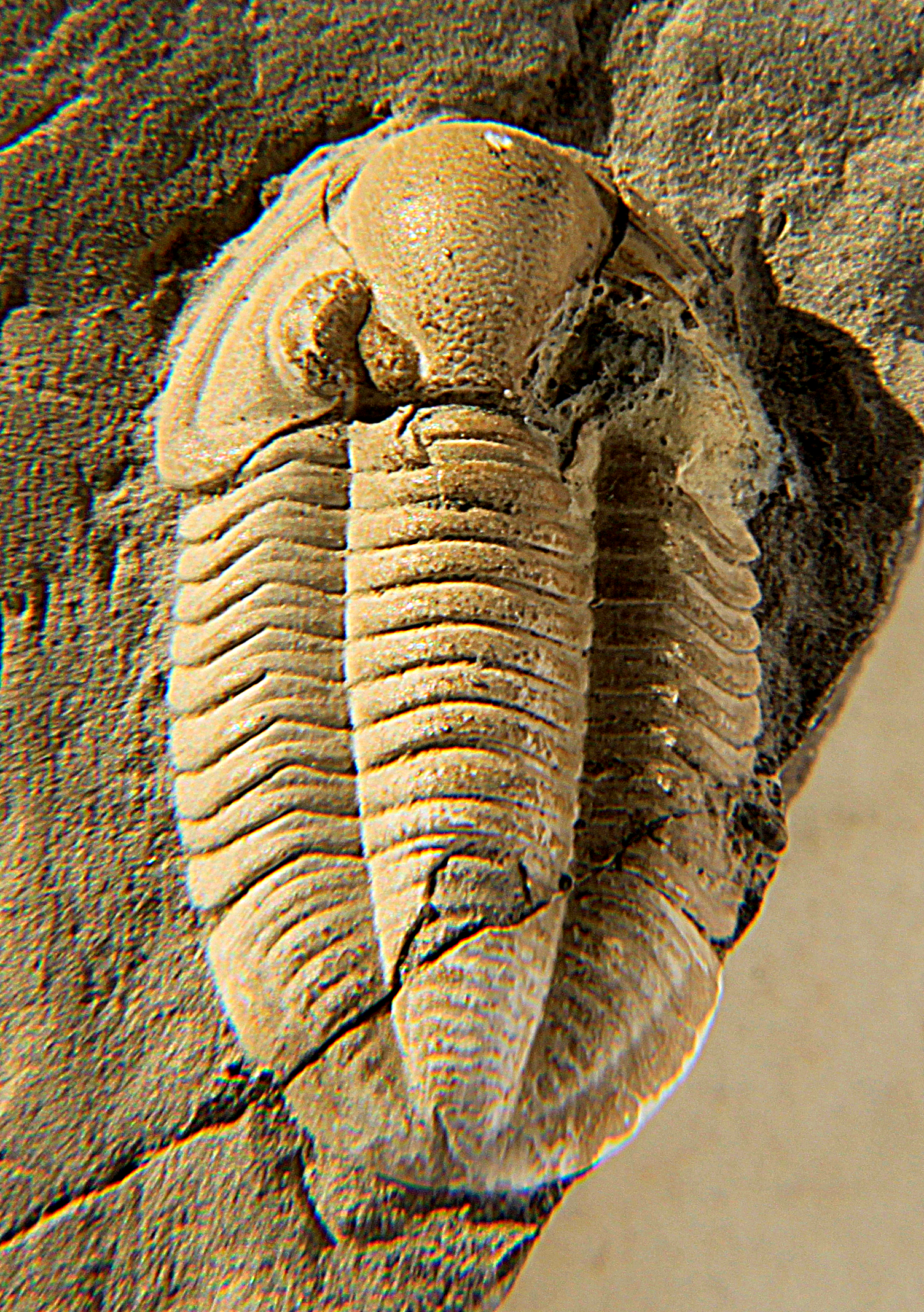
A trilobite in the genus Cummingella, related to C. oregonensis

Island chains continued to form over Oregon through the Permian period. Fossil assemblages from that time are therefore similar to those from the Carboniferous, although none have been found that include any Permian plant life. One species of Permian snail found in Oregon, Acteonina permiana, lends credence to the theory of plate tectonics because of its resemblance to contemporary Eurasian species. Fragmentary remains of Permian trilobites, including the endemic species Cummingella oregonensis, have been found in the state's Coyote Butte Formation.

== Mesozoic Era ==
Oregon remained covered by shallow seaways throughout the Mesozoic era. Rising temperatures throughout the era led to rising sea levels. Oregon's fossil flora and fauna track these environmental changes with the addition of species adapted to deeper water or more tropical terrestrial conditions.

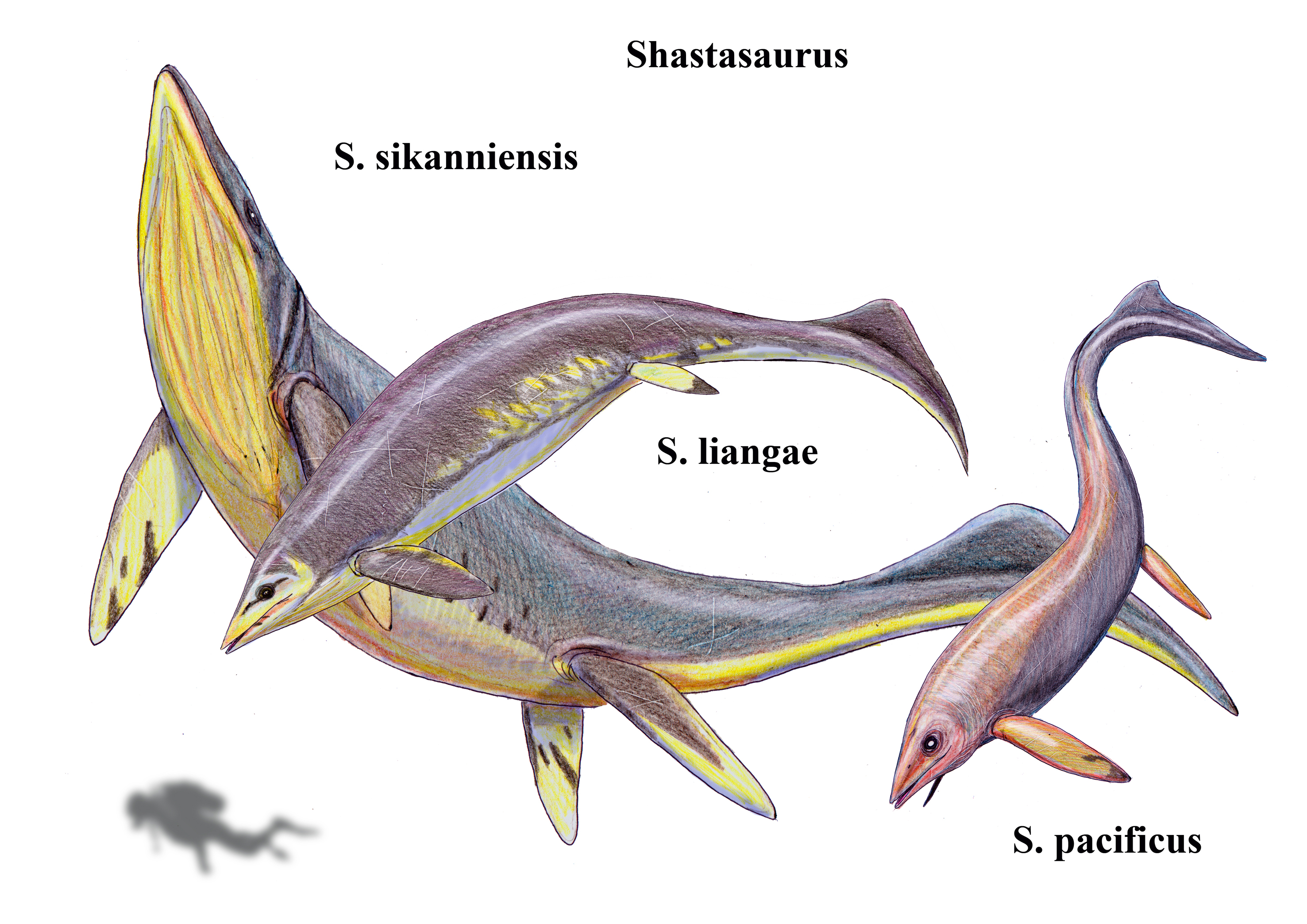
Artist's reconstruction of ichthyosaurs in the genus Shastasaurus

A new series of tropical islands emerged during the Triassic period, formed by the merging of the state's older volcanic chains. The only plant fossil from Oregon's Triassic formations is Diplopora oregonensis. As in the Paleozoic, shallow water invertebrates made up Oregon's Triassic fauna. These include sponges, ammonites, radiolarians, brachiopods, and the belemnite Aulacoceras. The trace fossil Chondrites, a species of fodinichnid, has been found in the same formations. Although corals have also been found in these assemblages, paleontologists debate the presence of true coral reefs in the region during the Triassic. The oldest vertebrate fossils in Oregon's fossil record appear in Triassic-aged limestones in the Wallowa Mountains. These fossils, including vertebrae, ribs, and a partial skull, have been assigned to the early ichthyosaur genus Shastasaurus. Additionally, a new genus of basal thalattosaur has been recovered from the Brisbois Member of the Vester Formation in Central Oregon near the community of Suplee.

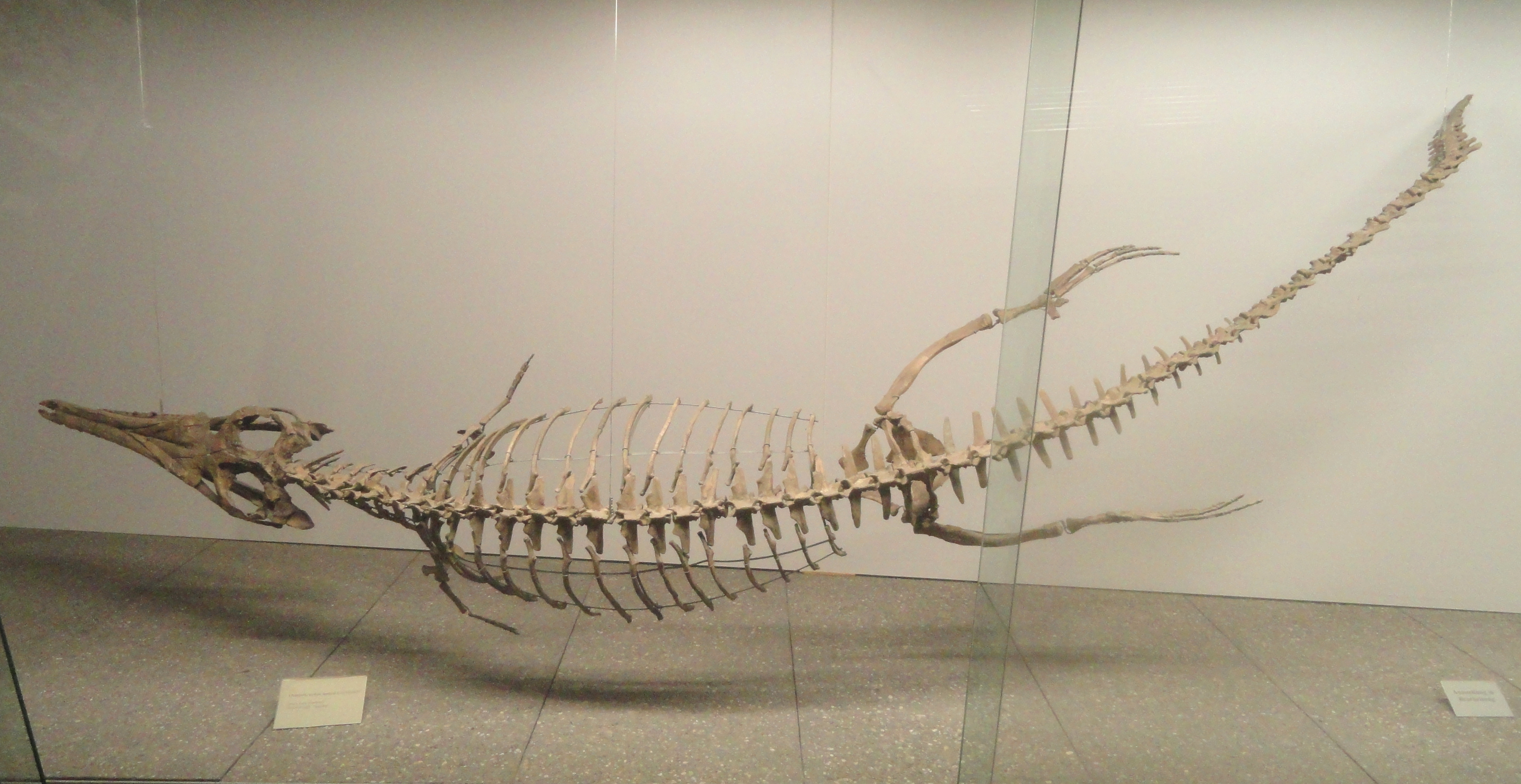
A crocodile in the genus Metriorhynchus

The breakup of the Pangaean supercontinent during the transition to the Jurassic period created a subduction zone in Oregon's ancient seaway, burying older rock formations and giving way to new volcanic island chains. Oregon's Jurassic invertebrates, such as the reef-building clam Lithiolus problematicus and the mussel-like Buchia piochii, indicate shallow sea environments similar to those of the state's late Triassic. Among Oregon's Jurassic-aged vertebrate fossils are the remains of marine crocodiles known as Zoneait. These crocodiles likely shared Oregon's Jurassic seaways with ichthyosaurs. Plant fossils from Oregon's Jurassic period show that the terrestrial environment became warmer and wetter, creating swampy conditions. These fossils, from the Coon Hollow Formation and others of similar age, include ferns, quillworts, cycads, and conifers.

Oregon's islands collided with the Laramidian continent at the end of the Jurassic, creating a new western coastline during the Cretaceous period. This coastline later developed through a combination of sea level change and mountain uplift. Global temperatures reached their maximum during the mid-Cretaceous, melting mountain ice and increasing global sea levels. As sea levels rose the Pacific grew to cover more of Oregon's landmass, eventually stopping at the base of a coastal mountain range. These mountains blocked oceanic weather systems, creating a tropical rainy environment along the ancient Oregonian coast. Although the mountain range ran along that Cretaceous coast, it was different from Oregon's modern Coast Range.

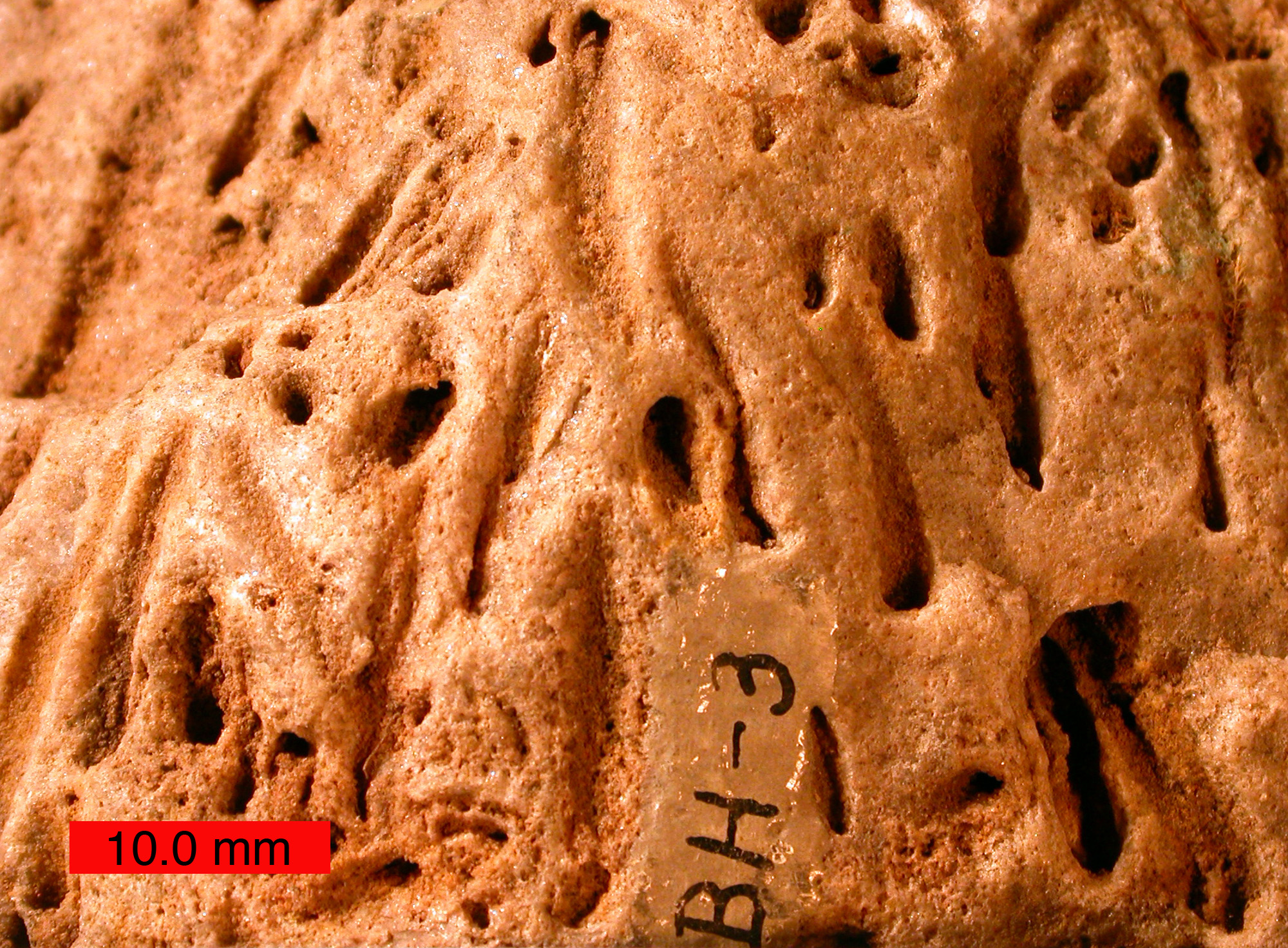
A trace fossil attributed to the genus Skolithos

Because of the spread of seaways over Oregon during the Cretaceous, plant remains from that time period tend to be rare in the region. Those that have been found come from the state's southwest and northeast, which indicate the presence of small islands in those areas during the period. Plant fossils from these areas tend to be endemic to the region. These include species of the fern Dicksonia, cycads Ctenis and Ctenophyllum, conifers Podozamites and Taxites, seeds of the palm Attalea, and the tree-fern Tempskya. The tree-fern fossils have been found associated with ammonites, suggesting the location of an ancient shoreline. Other Cretaceous invertebrates in the region are similar to those found in Jurassic formations. Cretaceous formations in Oregon tend to include a wider variety of trace fossils, including the fodinichnids Planolites, Skolithos, Glossifungites, and Arenicolites. Oregon's oldest known crustacean, a unique species named Hoploparia riddlensis, is also of Cretaceous age.

Oregon's vertebrates become more diverse in its Cretaceous fossil record. An amateur discovery in 2005, popularly dubbed "Mitchell's Monster," shows that short-necked plesiosaurs roamed the state's Cretaceous seas along with ichthyosaurs. Other sites nearby in Wheeler County have yielded the remains of Oregon's only known pterosaur, attributed to Bennettazhia oregonensis, as well as teeth from the extinct goblin shark Scapanorhynchus. Only two non-avian dinosaur fossils have been found in Oregon, and both are isolated bones in marine rocks, which evidently bloated and floated out to sea. One is the pedal phalanx of a large (5 m long) ornithopod, intermediate in size and morphology between Tenontosaurus and Eolambia, from the Early Cretaceous (Albian) Hudspeth Shale near Mitchell, Oregon. The other is a sacrum fragment, attributable to a hadrosaur similar to Lambeosaurus, recovered from Late Cretaceous (Campanian) sandstones at Cape Sebastian on the southern Oregon coast.

There is no geological record in Oregon of the K-Pg boundary or of the event that ended the Mesozoic era.

== Cenozoic Era ==
Oregon's paleoenvironment in the Cenozoic reflected the era's overall global cooling trend, shifting from tropical to temperate to glacial climates. Westward shift in the state's shoreline brought a more diverse terrestrial fauna, including a variety of extinct land mammals.

The state's earliest Paleogene deposits record an environment that was warm and wet, similar to the modern American southeast. Fossils from this time include pollen and leaves from ferns, spongeplants, hazelnuts, water elms, laurels, and horsetails. Trees that would become more common when temperatures later cooled, including alder and birch, made their first appearance along Oregon's Paleogene coastline. Invertebrate foramenifera from the Paleogene have been reported from sediments in Coos County, but their identity remains disputed.

Oregon's mid-to-late Paleogene fossil record is split between the ocean-covered western part of the state and the terrestrial east, where mammals made their first appearance in the state's fossil record.

In western Oregon's ocean, the new Cascadia subduction zone laid the foundations for Oregon's modern Coast Range and improved ocean productivity, prompting diversification among the state's fauna. At least 25 species of mollusk, including several snails, are known from the Fern Ridge Dam area alone. Other marine invertebrates include echinoderms, foramenifera, brachiopods, scaphopods, shrimp, and crabs. Shark teeth from over a dozen genera have been found at a variety of sites, including the Rocky Point Quarry to the west of the Nehalem River. These genera include dogfish, horn sharks, comb-toothed sharks, makos, tiger sharks, white sharks, and an archaic basking shark. Bony fish included mahi mahi, conger eels, rattails, ancestral billfish, cod, hake, and rockfish. Marine birds in the area included auks, the local species Hydrotherikornis oregonus, and the pelican-like Phocavis maritimus. The state's only known fossil egg was found in associated rock formations.

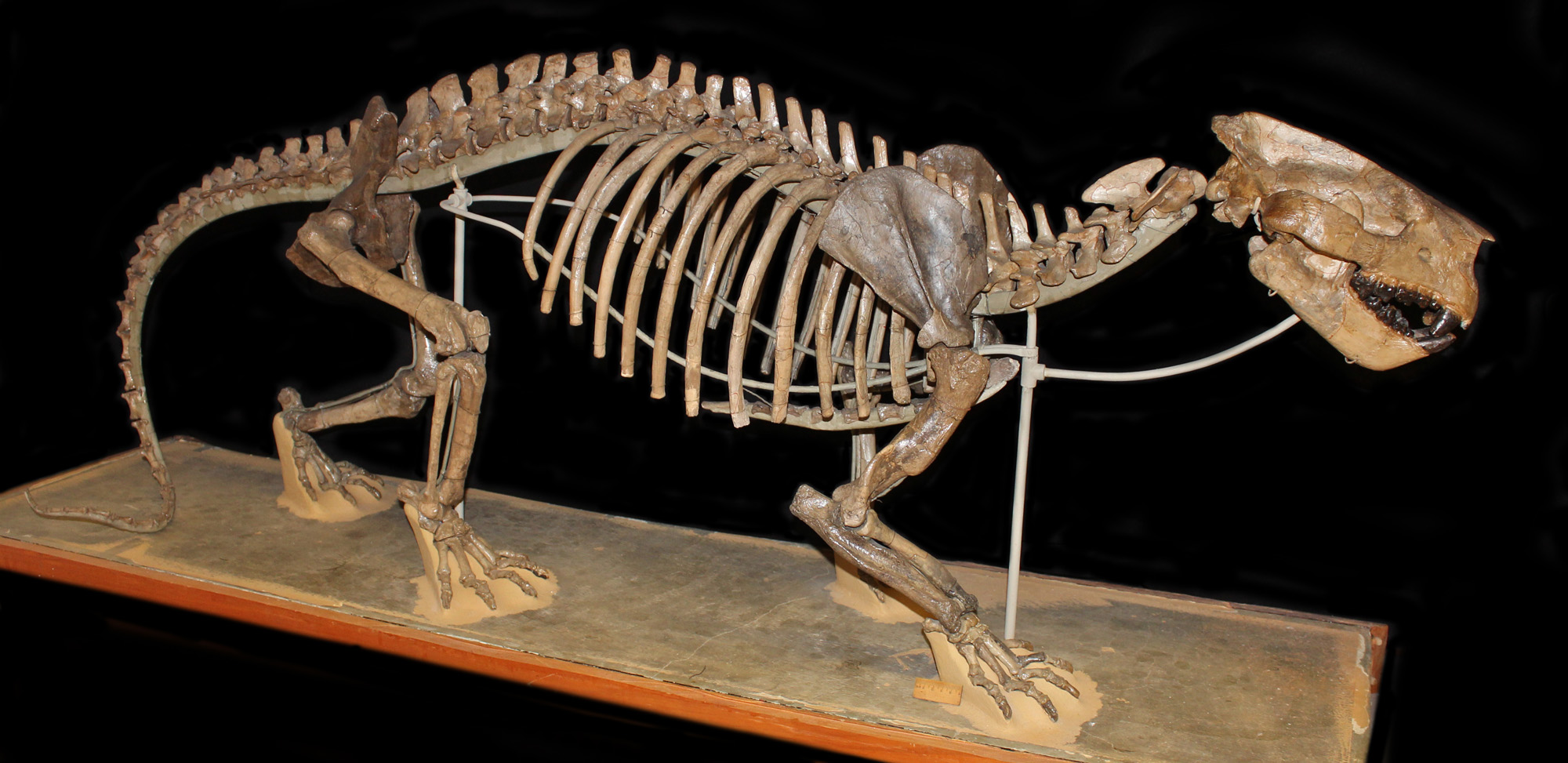
A Patriofelis skeleton

The subduction zone's volcanic activity also formed the Cascade volcanic arc, which blocked moist air from the Pacific and created the state's High Desert. This is when Oregon's fossil-rich John Day Fossil Beds were first laid down. The earliest fossils in John Day indicate a subtropical terrestrial environment. The assemblage is rich in fossil seeds, fruit nuts, and associated woods, and is one of the few places in the world where all three are preserved in a single location. The flora included cinnamon, cycads, palms, the primitive sycamore Platanophyllum angustilobus, walnuts, magnolias, figs, grapes, coffee trees, cashews, and bananas. The state's earliest known land mammals—including the rhinoceros Hyrachyus, the early horse Orohippus, and the brontothere Telmatherium—browsed these flora. Among the area's predators was Patriofelis, a cat-like creodont. These mammals shared the ecosystem with crocodiles in the genus Pristichampsus and the tortoise Hadrianus.

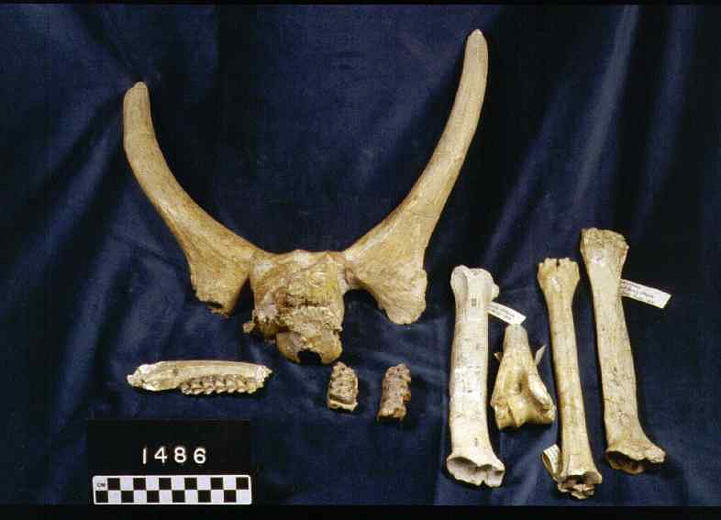
Horns and other fossils attributed to Dromomeryx

In the transition from the late Paleogene to the Neogene period, Oregon's climate became drier and its environments became more similar to those of the modern day. Grasses appeared and spread across the landscape, leaving fossilized leaves in the John Day beds. Metasequoia occidentalis, a conifer closely related to modern redwoods, flourished across the state during this time. Mammals and other fauna diversified and became more common. Early additions included camels such as Paratylopus and Gentilicamelus and pecora such as Hypertragulus. Later additions included perissodactyls such as Merychippus, Parahippus, Protapirus, and Diceratherium, artiodactyls such as Dromomeryx and Blastomeryx, and proboscids like Gomphotherium and Platybelodon. Rodents including the burrowing beaver Palaeocastor and horned gopher Mylagaulus. Predators in this time period included bear-dogs such as Amphicyon, cat-like nimravids, entelodonts, and early canids such as Cormocyon. Remains of the early primate Ekgmowechashala have also been found in the John Day fossil beds. The site has also yielded the oldest known fossil grasshopper eggs.

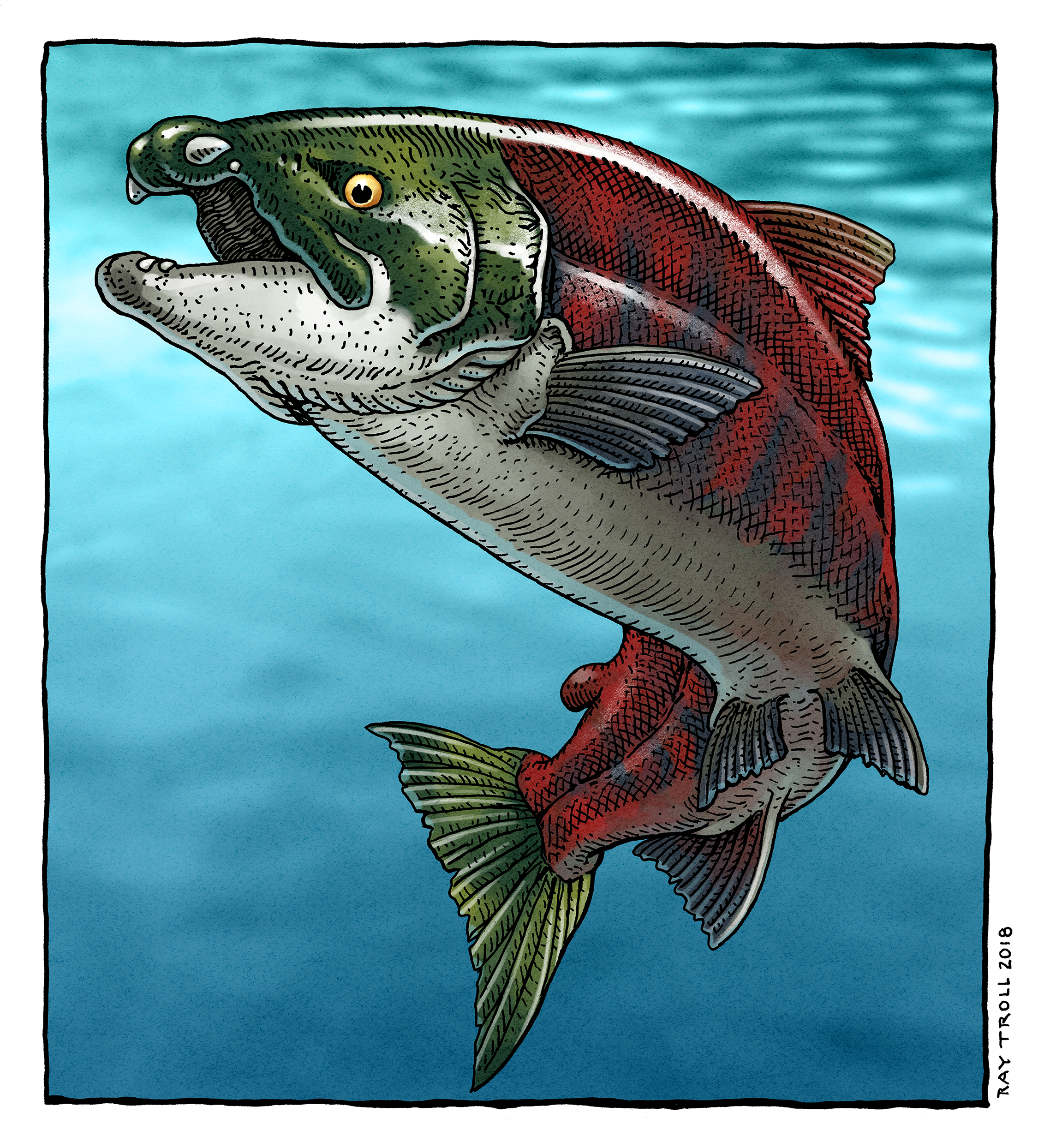
Artist's reconstruction of the saber-toothed salmon Oncorhynchus rastrosus

Aquatic mammals made their first appearance in Oregon along the early Neogene coast. Fossils from early pinnipeds such Enaliarctos and the primitive walrus Proneotherium have been found in Lincoln County. Kolponomos newportensis, a bear-like aquatic carnivore with features similar to saber-toothed predators, comes from nearby deposits of similar age. Whales such as Aetiocetus and the primitive mysticete Cophocetus oregonensis appear in Oregon's fossil record in this period. Sirenians and desmostylids have also been found in coastal assemblages. Paleontologists believe that animals in these two groups fed on clams and other mollusks, which is consistent with fossil clam beds found in the Coast Range. The saber-tooth salmon Oncorhynchus rastrosus also swam in Oregon's Neogene rivers. Global cooling in the late Neogene gave way to glaciation in the Quaternary. Oregon's mountain ranges were covered in large ice caps, although the Cordilleran Ice Sheet did not extend into the state. Evidence of ice cap increase and decrease is preserved in a series of glacial lakes, including Glacier Lake. Glacial erratics can be found across the northern half of the state, including sites such as the Erratic Rock State Natural Site. Pluvial lakes are also common across the state. These include Fossil Lake, which is the source of Oregon's largest Pleistocene fossil assemblage. Included in this assemblage are typical Pleistocene megafauna, including Columbian mammoths, dire wolves, Ice Age bison, camels, the ground sloth Mylodon and the short-faced bear Arctodus (which was previously mistaken for its cousin Arctotherium). The assemblage also includes over 50 species of waterfowl, including grebes, cormorants, swans, gulls, flamingos, herons, and pelicans. Among the bony fish species found in Fossil Lake's assemblage are several salmon species.

Pleistocene megafauna are found across the northern half of Oregon and include such finds as the Tualatin mastodon, the McMinnville mammoth, and the Woodburn Teratornis. The Willamette Valley Pleistocene Project has reported the discovery of mammoth tracks, attributable to the ichnotaxon Proboscipeda, near the Yamhill River. A spectacular set of 117 mammoth tracks some 43,000 years old at Fossil Lake, near Christmas Valley, reveal a touching drama of wounded mother and concerned yearlings A 9-meter bear trackway, including tracks of the same size and age as Arctodus has been found near Lakeview.

Tectonic activity associated with the Cascadian Subduction Zone continued throughout the Quaternary, leaving evidence of a series of earthquakes and tsunamis in the past 60 thousand years. At the end of the Last Glacial Maximum, collapse of the ice dam surrounding Lake Missoula initiated a series of large-scale floods that inundated much of the state from 19-13 thousand years ago. Around 14 thousand years ago, the Bonneville Flood contributed more floodwaters to many of the same areas. These floods contributed to the modern fertility of the Willamette Valley by transporting soils from the east. Given the timing of these events, it is unlikely that they contributed to the extinction of Pleistocene megafauna such as mammoths and ground sloths in Oregon.

The earliest evidence of human occupation in Oregon comes from human coprolites in Paisley Caves dated to 14,300 years ago. Other early sites include an encampment near Bandon dated to around 10,000 years ago and a pair of sandals from Fort Rock Cave dated to around 9,000 years ago. The margin of error for these dates makes it possible that humans contributed to the extinction of Oregon's Pleistocene megafauna.

== History ==
=== Indigenous interpretations ===
Ancient people living near Fossil, Oregon collected fossils as far back as 11,000 years ago and kept them at a dwelling that has since been uncovered by archeologists. Some of the fossils kept there were pierced to be made into jewelry. Five slabs of rock bearing leaf impressions were found neatly stacked in the corner of the site. These and other fossils discovered by Native Americans may have contributed to the development of local myths and lore. Historian Adrienne Mayor cites as an example the Klamath Tribes of the Modoc, who attributed local fossils to water monsters killed by the mythological figure Coyote.

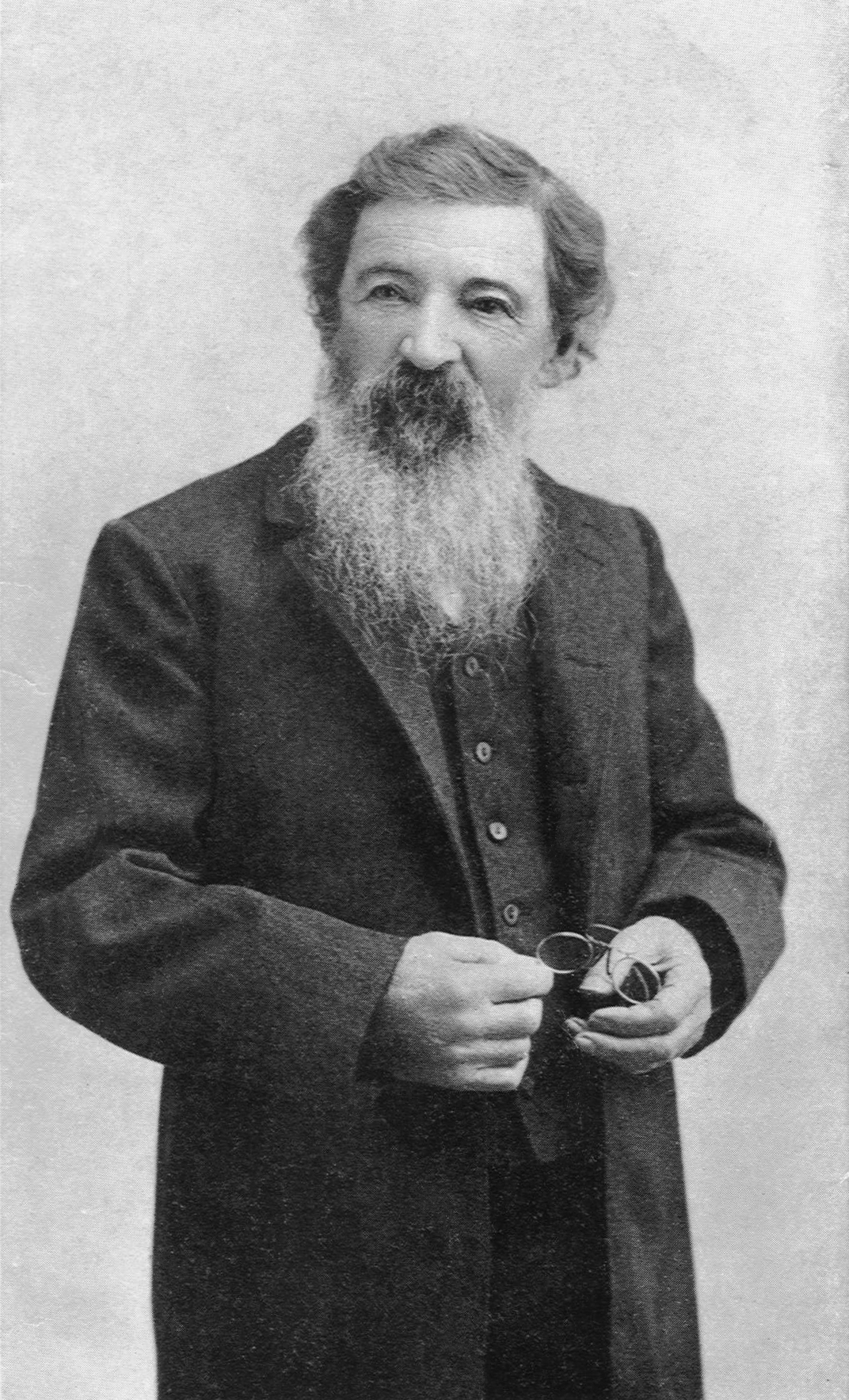
Thomas Condon (1822-1907), Oregon's first paleontologist

=== Scientific research ===
==== Professional work ====
Oregon's first paleontologist was Thomas Condon. Condon began collecting in 1861, when a company of soldiers that arrived in Fort Dalles, where Condon served as the Congregational church pastor. The soldiers brought fossil bones and teeth, including a well-preserved rhinoceros jaw, from the John Day fossil beds. When soldiers were dispatched the following year to Harney Valley, near the fossil beds, Condon went along with them and prospected for fossils. He went fossil collecting again in 1863 and discovered rich fossil deposits north of Picture Gorge in the John Day River valley.

Condon realized that he had stumbled on a find of major scientific importance. Since he himself had no scientific qualifications or references to use in identifying fossils, Condon sent some fossils to Othniel Charles Marsh of Yale University. Marsh replied with a request for Condon to guide an expedition to the area in which he found the fossils. Condon obliged and over the ensuing years a series of fossil hunting expeditions ventured into the John Day fossil beds. A number of Condon's specimens ended up in prestigious museums like the American Museum of Natural History and Smithsonian Institution, with the bulk of his collection stored in the University of Oregon Museum of Natural and Cultural History.

Edward Drinker Cope, whose rivalry with Marsh spurred the "Bone Wars" of the late nineteenth century, also collected fossils in Oregon. His findings from the state are described in his book Vertebrata of the Tertiary Formations of the West.

In the present day, Oregon State University and the University of Oregon both maintain active research programs in paleontology. Oregon State University's Terry Lab, under the supervision of Rebecca Terry, produces research into paleoecology and Quaternary climate change. The University of Oregon's Vertebrate Paleontology Lab, under the supervision of Samantha Hopkins and Edward Davis, focuses on Oregon's extinct mammals. The University of Oregon's paleontology faculty also includes Greg Retallack, who studies fossilized soils. Many of the finds described above were collected, described, and analyzed by researchers in these programs and their predecessors.

John Day Fossil Beds National Monument, managed by the National Park Service, has also been employing paleontologists on staff since the 1980s.The current Paleontology Program Manager is Dr. Nicholas Famoso. Recent research from the park includes volcano ecology, radiometric dating, gis applications, systematic paleontology, and mammal paleoecology.

The Oregon state legislature declared the species Metasequoia occidentalis to be Oregon's official state fossil in a resolution passed in 2005.

==== Amateur work ====
There are several organizations located in Oregon devoted to citizen science initiatives related to paleontology. Among these is the North American Research Group, which was responsible for discovery of the "Mitchell's Monster" plesiosaur and "Bernie" the Jurassic thalattosaurian. Another amateur group is the Willamette Valley Pleistocene Project, which collects from sites in McMinnville, Tualatin, Woodburn, Newberg, and King's Valley.

== Notable people ==
- Thomas Condon
- Edward Drinker Cope
- Othniel Charles Marsh

== Notable locations ==
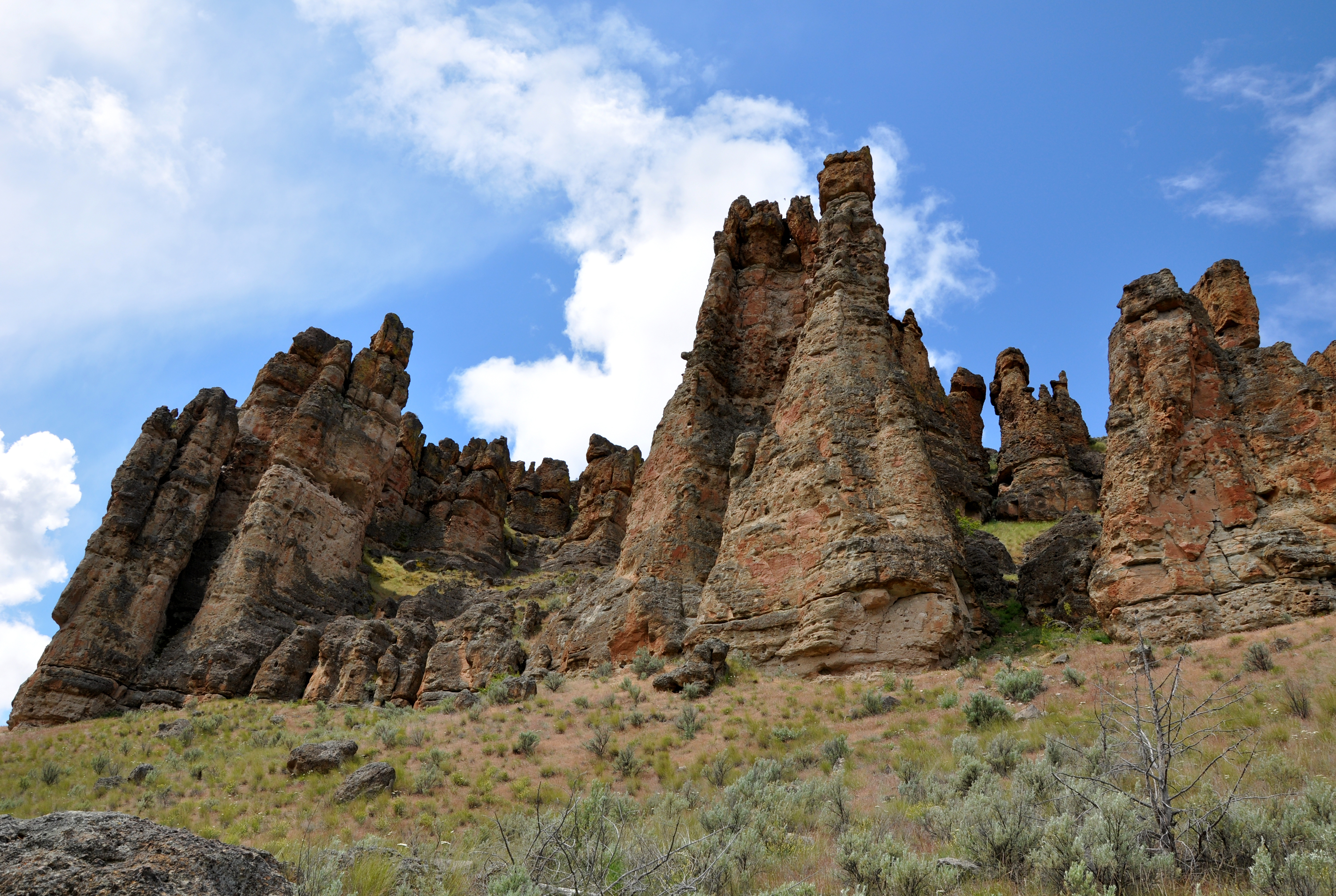
Clarno Formation rocks in the John Day Fossil Beds National Monument

=== Fossil localities ===
- Astoria Formation
- Blue Mountains
- Coyote Butte Formation
- Curry County
- Fossil Lake
- Keasey Formation
- Nye Formation
- Pittsburg Bluff Formation
- Wallowa Mountains

=== Protected areas ===
- John Day Fossil Beds National Monument
- Paisley Caves

=== Natural history museums ===
- University of Oregon Museum of Natural and Cultural History, Eugene
- Thomas Condon Paleontology Center, John Day Fossil Beds National Monument

== See also ==
- Paleontology in California
- Paleontology in Idaho
- Paleontology in Nevada
- Paleontology in Washington (state)
