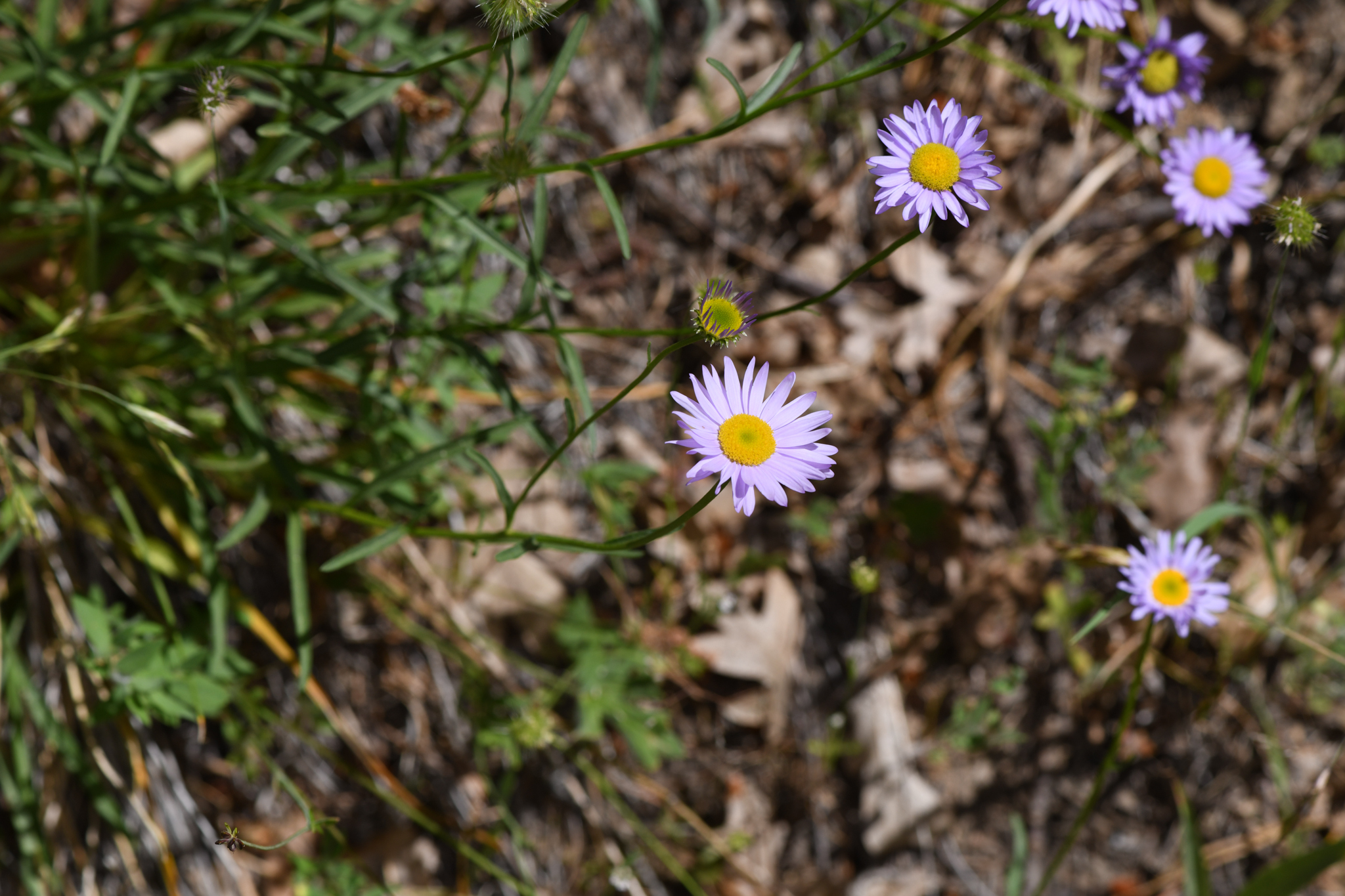

Conservation status
- Vulnerable (NatureServe)

Scientific classification
- Kingdom: Plantae
- Clade: Tracheophytes
- Clade: Angiosperms
- Clade: Eudicots
- Clade: Asterids
- Order: Asterales
- Family: Asteraceae
- Genus: Erigeron
- Species: E. robustior

Binomial name
- Erigeron robustior (Cronquist) G.L.Nesom

Synonyms
- Erigeron decumbens subsp. robustior Cronquist; Erigeron decumbens var. robustior (Cronquist) Cronquist

= Erigeron robustior =

Species of flowering plant

Erigeron robustior is a North American species of flowering plant in the family Asteraceae known by the common name white cushion fleabane or robust daisy. It is native to the southwestern Oregon and northern California in the western United States.

Erigeron robustior grows in rocky or gravely slopes, sometimes in serpentine soil. It is a perennial herb up to 55 centimeters (22 inches) tall, forming a thin tap root, not growing into colonies as do some of the other species in the genus. The inflorescence usually contains one to three flower heads. Each head contains 21–36 white or pink ray florets surrounding many yellow disc florets.
